= List of county routes in Chemung County, New York =

County routes in Chemung County, New York, are signed with the Manual on Uniform Traffic Control Devices-standard yellow-on-blue pentagon route marker.

== Routes 1–50 ==
Route	Length (mi)	Length (km)	From	Via	To	Notes
CR 1	12.03	19.36	NY 17 exit 56 / NY 352 in Elmira	Jerusalem Hill and North Chemung roads and Church Street	NY 223 / CR 16 in Horseheads	
CR 2	3.32	5.34	Dead end at NY 17 in Chemung	Lowman Road	CR 1 in Elmira	
CR 3	16.19	26.06	NY 961A at CR 60 in Chemung	Wyncoop Creek Road	NY 224 in Van Etten	
CR 4	3.68	5.92	CR 3	Marsh Road in Erin	NY 223	
CR 5	8.14	13.10	CR 68 in Horseheads	Ridge Road	Schuyler County line in Veteran (becomes CR 15)	
CR 6	7.57	12.18	CR 5 in Horseheads	Middle Road	CR 5 in Veteran	
CR 6A	1.32	2.12	NY 14 in Millport	Cemetery Hill and Millport Hill roads	CR 6 in Veteran	
CR 7			Steuben County line in Southport	Hendy Creek Road	Reference route at Golden Glow Drive in Big Flats	Former number; now part of NY 225
CR 8	1.00	1.61	NY 427 in Wellsburg	Lowman Crossover	CR 60 in Ashland	Formerly part of NY 367
CR 10	1.20	1.93	Steuben County line (becomes CR 44)	South Corning Road in Big Flats	NY 352	
CR 11	1.90	3.06	CR 35	Murphy Hill Road in Catlin	End of county maintenance	
CR 12	4.62	7.44	Schuyler County line in Catlin (becomes CR 18)	Johnson Hollow Road	NY 14 in Veteran	
CR 13	6.16	9.91	CR 62	Langford Street and Langford Creek Road in Van Etten	Tompkins County line (becomes CR 131)	
CR 14	0.78	1.26	NY 223	Swartwood Road in Van Etten	NY 224	Discontinuous at Cayuta Creek
CR 15	3.56	5.73	CR 15A in Veteran	East Sullivanville Road	Schuyler County line in Erin	
CR 15A	0.65	1.05	Vargo Road	Old Sullivanville Road in Veteran	NY 13	Former routing of NY 13
CR 15B	0.43	0.69	NY 13	Old Sullivanville Road in Horseheads	Dead end at Sullivanville Dam	Former routing of NY 13
CR 16	3.61	5.81	NY 223 / CR 1 in Horseheads	Jackson Creek Road	Lesky Road in Erin	
CR 17	7.39	11.89	I-86 / NY 17 exit 49 in Big Flats	Maple Street and Hibbard and Sing Sing roads	Dead end at NY 17 in Horseheads	
CR 17A	0.09	0.14	CR 17	Hibbard Road Extension South in Big Flats	Dead end at I-86 / NY 17	
CR 17B	0.09	0.14	Dead end at I-86 / NY 17	Hibbard Road Extension North in Big Flats	CR 17	
CR 18	0.70	1.13	CR 58	Lenox Avenue in Horseheads	CR 65	
CR 19	0.31	0.50	CR 66	Fairview Road in Horseheads	CR 65	
CR 20	2.70	4.35	Horseheads village line	East Franklin Street in Horseheads	NY 223	
CR 21	1.74	2.80	NY 14	Wygant Road in Horseheads	CR 68	
CR 22	3.61	5.81	CR 1 in Baldwin	Hogback Road	CR 3 in Chemung	
CR 23 (1)	4.73	7.61	CR 56	Dry Brook Road in Chemung	Hagerman Road	
CR 23 (2)	1.74	2.80	CR 3	Mallory Road in Chemung	Souls Hill Road	
CR 24	1.30	2.09	NY 223	Decker Road in Van Etten	CR 3	
CR 26	3.85	6.20	Pennsylvania state line	Christian Hollow Road in Southport	NY 14	
CR 27	2.08	3.35	Pennsylvania state line	Bird Creek Road in Southport	CR 69	
CR 28	0.79	1.27	NY 427	South Main Street in Southport	Elmira city line	
CR 29	3.88	6.24	CR 69	Dry Run Road in Southport	CR 36	
CR 31	2.72	4.38	End of county maintenance	Mount Zoar Road in Southport	Elmira city line	
CR 33	4.07	6.55	CR 64 in Big Flats	West Hill Road	CR 61 / CR 72 in Elmira city	
CR 35	11.59	18.65	CR 64 in Big Flats	Chambers Road	NY 414 in Catlin	Section south of Catlin Hill Road was designated as NY 365 from 1930 to ca. 1932.
CR 36	6.85	11.02	CR 78	Dutch Hill Road in Southport	NY 225	
CR 37	1.20	1.93	NY 223	Fairview Road in Erin	CR 4	
CR 38	3.41	5.49	NY 223	Laurel Hill Road in Erin	CR 76	
CR 39	0.22	0.35	Elmira Heights village line	East 14th Street in Horseheads	CR 65	
CR 40	0.82	1.32	NY 367	Berwick Turnpike in Wellsburg	NY 427	
CR 41	5.38	8.66	CR 1 in Baldwin	Federal Road	CR 4 in Erin	
CR 42	4.78	7.69	CR 2 in Chemung	Hoffman Hollow and Ridge Road	CR 22 in Baldwin	
CR 43	0.22	0.35	Elmira/Corning Regional Airport	Schweitzer Road in Big Flats	CR 35 / CR 74	
CR 43A	0.32	0.51	CR 17	Airport Road in Big Flats	Dead end	
CR 46	0.85	1.37	NY 34 in Van Etten village	Warner Street and Warner Road	Tioga County line in Van Etten (becomes CR 18)	
CR 47	6.48	10.43	CR 21 in Horseheads	Veteran Hill Road	Terry Hill Road in Veteran	
CR 48	3.34	5.38	NY 224	McDuffy Hollow Road in Van Etten	CR 13	
CR 50	2.43	3.91	CR 60	Washington and North streets and West Dry Brook Road in Chemung	CR 23	

== Routes 51 and up ==
Route	Length (mi)	Length (km)	From	Via	To	Notes
CR 51	5.59	9.00	CR 65	Latta Brook Road in Horseheads	CR 1	
CR 52	4.51	7.26	Elmira city line in Elmira	Watercure Hill Road	CR 51 in Horseheads	
CR 54	0.33	0.53	Schuyler County line (becomes CR 13)	Jackson Hollow Road in Van Etten	Tompkins County line (becomes CR 132)	
CR 55	4.40	7.08	NY 352	Harris Hill Road in Big Flats	CR 64	
CR 55A	0.77	1.24	CR 55	Soaring Hill Drive in Big Flats	Harris Hill Gliderport	
CR 56 (1)	2.24	3.60	CR 60 / CR 71	River Road in Chemung	Tioga County line	
CR 56 (2)	1.73	2.78	NY 17 exit 59A at Pennsylvania state line	White Wagon Road in Chemung	Dead end at Chemung River	
CR 57	2.89	4.65	CR 74 in Big Flats	Hickory Grove Road	NY 14 in Horseheads	
CR 58	0.68	1.09	Elmira Heights village line	Oakwood Avenue in Horseheads	CR 66	
CR 59	2.06	3.32	NY 14	Smith Road in Veteran	CR 5	
CR 60	12.42	19.99	I-86 / NY 17 in Elmira	Brant and Oneida roads and Old Route 17	Tioga County line in Chemung (becomes CR 60)	Former routing of NY 17
CR 60A	0.16	0.26	NY 17	Newtown Reservation Road in Elmira	CR 60	
CR 60B	0.12	0.19	NY 17	Fountain Lane in Chemung	CR 60	
CR 60C	0.05	0.08	NY 17	Landfill exit in Chemung	CR 60	
CR 61	3.33	5.36	NY 352 in Elmira	Coleman Avenue and Hillcrest Road	CR 33 / CR 72 in Elmira city	
CR 62	1.19	1.92	NY 224 in Van Etten	Main and Front streets	NY 34 in Van Etten village	
CR 63	0.64	1.03	I-86 / NY 17 exit 50	Kahler Road North in Big Flats	CR 17	
CR 64	5.32	8.56	NY 352 in Big Flats	Main Street and Horseheads–Big Flats Road	NY 962E at I-86 / NY 17 exit 52A in Horseheads	Former routing of NY 17
CR 64A	0.23	0.37	CR 64 / CR 64C	Sears Road in Big Flats	Dead end	
CR 64B	0.42	0.68	CR 64A in Big Flats	Fisherville Road	Dead end in Horseheads	
CR 64C	0.45	0.72	Dead end	Fisherville Road in Big Flats	CR 64 / CR 64A	
CR 65	1.89	3.04	Elmira city line in Elmira	Lake Road	CR 51 in Horseheads	Former routing of NY 13
CR 66	1.63	2.62	Elmira city line in Elmira	Grand Central Avenue	Horseheads village line in Horseheads	Discontinuous at Elmira Heights village limits
CR 67	0.39	0.63	Horseheads village line	Watkins Road in Horseheads	NY 14	Former routing of NY 14
CR 68	2.35	3.78	Horseheads village line	Old Ithaca Road in Horseheads	NY 13 / NY 223	Former routing of NY 13
CR 69	6.24	10.04	NY 328	Pennsylvania Avenue in Southport	Elmira city line	Former routing of NY 328 southwest of Broadway; former routing of NY 14 northeast of Broadway
CR 69A	0.07	0.11	Dead end	Firehouse Lane in Southport	CR 69	
CR 70	0.73	1.17	Dead end	Philo Road West in Horseheads	Horseheads village line	
CR 71	1.87	3.01	CR 56 / CR 60	Rotary Road in Chemung	CR 3	
CR 72	0.71	1.14	CR 33 / CR 61	Bancroft Road in Elmira city	Davis Street	
CR 73	0.20	0.32	Dead end	Rinebold Road in Big Flats	CR 33	
CR 74	1.56	2.51	CR 35 / CR 43 in Big Flats	Colonial Drive	CR 17 in Horseheads	
CR 75	0.47	0.76	CR 35	Arnot Road in Big Flats	CR 74	
CR 76	0.66	1.06	CR 38	Park Station Road in Erin	End of county maintenance	
CR 77	0.64	1.03	Dead end	Latta Brook Industrial Park in Horseheads	CR 51	
CR 77A	0.17	0.27	Dead end	Industrial Park Road in Horseheads	CR 77	
CR 78	3.87	6.23	Steuben County line (becomes CR 32)	Sagetown Road in Southport	NY 328	Formerly part of NY 328
CR 79	1.08	1.74	NY 14 / NY 328	Broadway in Southport	Elmira city line	Former routing of NY 14
CR 80	1.96	3.15	I-86 / NY 17 exit 49	Daniel Zenker Drive in Big Flats	CR 63	
CR 82	0.68	1.09	NY 352	Winters Road in Big Flats	CR 64	
CR 83	0.06	0.10	Dead end	Hunt Center in Big Flats	CR 80	
CR 84	0.27	0.43	CR 69	Cedar Street in Southport	NY 14 / NY 427	Formerly part of NY 427
CR 85	0.80	1.29	NY 427	Maple Avenue in Southport	Elmira city line	Former routing of NY 427
CR 86	0.78	1.26	CR 68	E Street in Horseheads	NY 13	
CR 87	0.16	0.26	CR 80	Wings of Eagles Drive in Big Flats	Dead end	

== See also ==
- County routes in New York
