= New York State Route 96B =

Highway in New York

New York State Route 96B
- NY 96B highlighted in red

Route information
- Auxiliary route of NY 96
- Maintained by NYSDOT and the city of Ithaca
- Length: 19.56 mi (31.48 km)
- Existed: November 1952–present

Major junctions
- South end: NY 96 in Candor
- North end: NY 13 / NY 34 / NY 96 in Ithaca

Location
- Country: United States
- State: New York
- Counties: Tioga, Tompkins

Highway system
- New York Highways; Interstate; US; State; Reference; Parkways
← NY 96A	→ NY 97

New York State Route 96B (NY 96B) is a north–south state highway in the Southern Tier of New York in the United States. It connects NY 96 in the village of Candor in Tioga County to NY 13, NY 34, and NY 96 in the city of Ithaca in Tompkins County. NY 96B approaches Ithaca from the south as Danby Road and then as South Aurora Street, before turning westward onto Clinton Street and proceeding to its northern terminus at a junction with NY 13, NY 34, and NY 96. The portion of NY 96B from the Ithaca city line to its northern terminus is maintained by the city.

== Route description ==
NY 96B begins at an intersection with NY 96 (Main Street), cosigned with NY 96 Truck, in the village of Candor. NY 96B proceeds northward along Owego Street as a two-lane residential street, passing west of a cemetery, and bending west as Owego Road. Changing names to Ithaca Road, the route intersects with County Route 17 (CR 17; Mill Street / Honeypot Road). Entering the town of Candor, NY 96B bends northward into the hamlet of Gridleyville, a rural area of Candor. After Gridleyille, NY 96B begins a winding alignment northward, passing to the southwest of Willseyville. After Willseyville, the route remains a two-lane northwest-bound highway, crossing the county line into Tompkins County and the town of Danby.

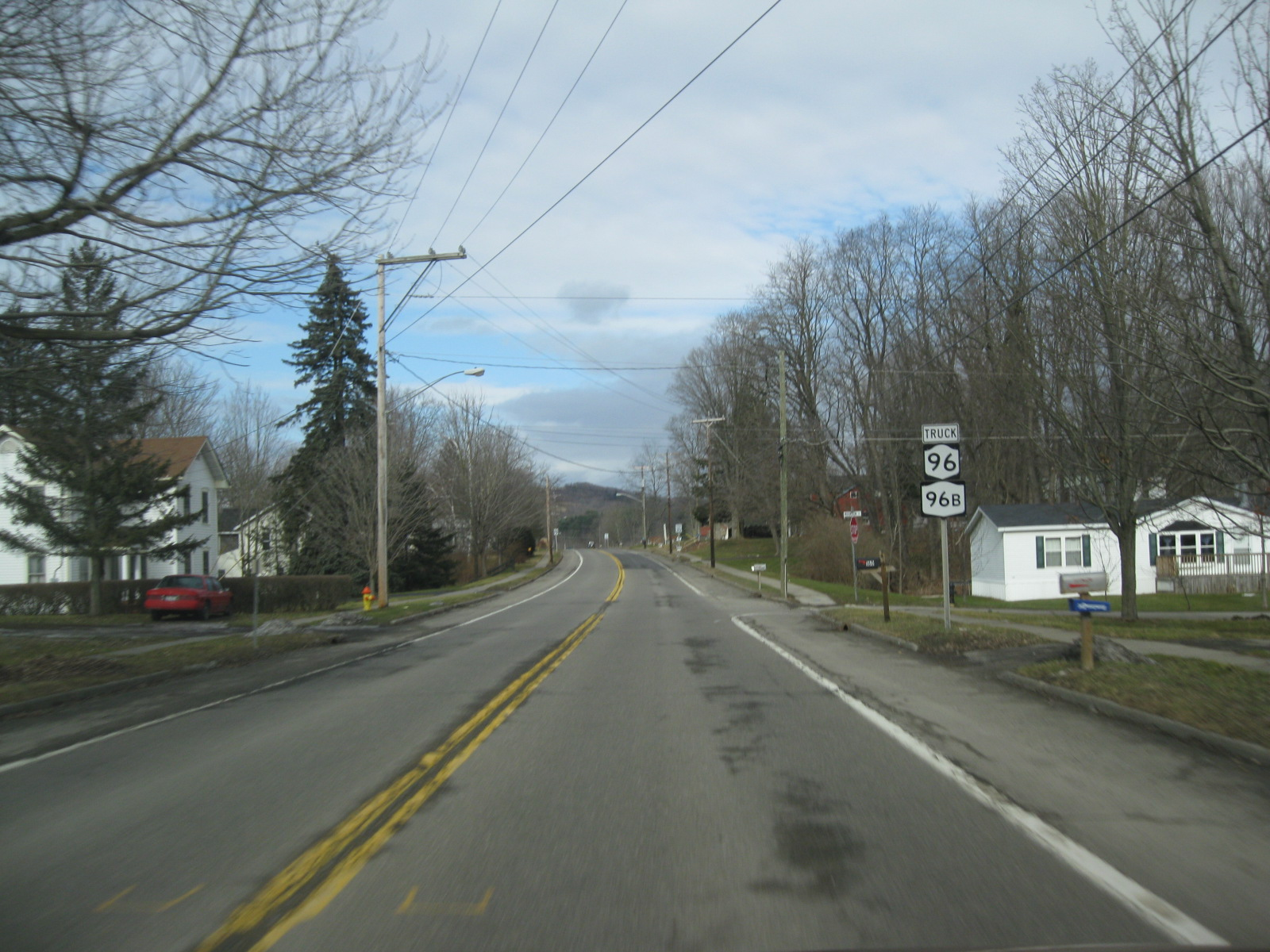
NY 96B (signed with NY 96 Truck) head northbound through Candor

NY 96B remains a two-lane rural roadway after the county line, crossing northwest through Danby, passing by some creek-side residences. After intersecting with the northern terminus of CR 125 (South Danby Road), NY 96B bends towards the north, passing Danby Rural Cemetery. After a stretch of residences, the roadway passes into the hamlet of Danby, intersecting with CR 126 (Bald Hill Road). Continuing northward, CR 127 (West Miller Road) intersects with NY 96B, continuing northward through the town of Danby as Danby Road. After an intersection with CR 128 (Comfort Road), NY 96B enters the town of Ithaca. In Ithaca, NY 96B intersects with the western terminus of CR 179 (East King Road) south of the campus for Ithaca College.

Passing between Buttermilk Falls State Park and Ithaca College, NY 96B continues northward along Danby Road until entering the city of Ithaca. In the city, NY 96B changes monikers to South Aurora Street, crossing northeast through the South Hill neighborhood. The route becomes a two-lane residential street at the southern end of the city, passing Hillview Park before intersecting with Prospect Street, where NY 96B turns west onto Prospect, which becomes Clinton Street. Crossing over a waterway, NY 96B crosses through the Central Business District, as a two-lane residential street. A short distance later, NY 96B terminates at an intersection with NY 13, NY 34, and NY 96 (South Meadow Street / South Fulton Street).

== History ==
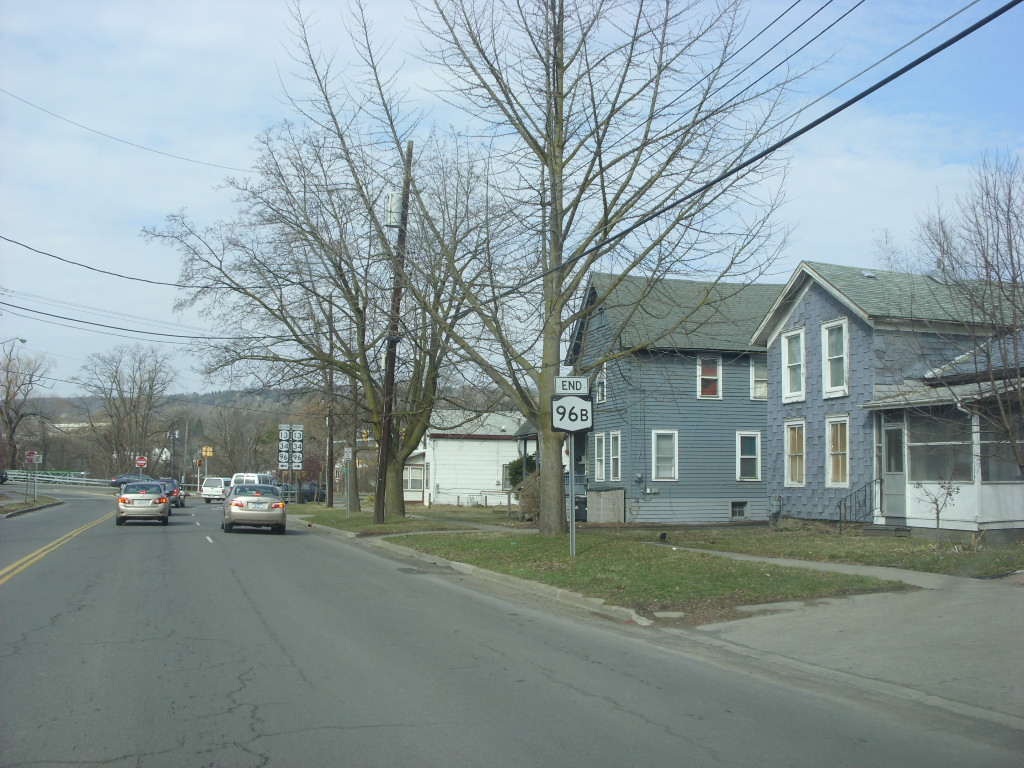
NY 96B approaching the intersection with NY 13, NY 34, and NY 96 in Ithaca

The precursor to NY 96B was the Owego and Ithaca Turnpike designated by the New York State legislature to extend from Cayuga Lake south to Owego. The same-named company that built the road road was chartered in 1809, and their road was completed in 1811. Before the Erie Canal, the road was one of the main routes of travel into Tompkins County. Except for a few minor alterations, all of NY 96B south of the city of Ithaca uses the old turnpike, though within the city the turnpike followed Coddington Road, Hudson Street, and Aurora Street to a terminus at Lincoln Street. South of Candor, the turnpike was redesignated NY 96.

The segment of the turnpike connecting the village of Candor to the city of Ithaca was designated as part of Route 36, an unsigned legislative route assigned by the New York State Legislature in 1908. When the first set of posted routes in New York were assigned in 1924, this part of Route 36 was included in the new NY 15, a highway extending from Owego to Rochester. NY 15 was renumbered to NY 2 c. 1939 to eliminate numerical duplication with U.S. Route 15. NY 2 was subsequently renumbered to NY 96 in the early 1940s. In November 1952, NY 96 was realigned between Candor and Ithaca to follow NY 223 to Spencer and NY 34 to Ithaca. The former routing of NY 96 between Candor and Ithaca was redesignated as NY 96B.

== Major intersections ==
County	Location	mi	km	Destinations	Notes
Tioga	Village of Candor	0.00	0.00	NY 96 (Main Street) – Owego, Spencer	Southern terminus
Tioga	Village of Candor	0.90	1.45	NY 960H (Mill Street) to NY 96	Northern terminus of unsigned NY 960H; former routing of NY 96B
Tompkins	City of Ithaca	19.56	31.48	NY 13 (South Meadow Street) / NY 34 (South Fulton Street) / NY 96	Northern terminus
1.000 mi = 1.609 km; 1.000 km = 0.621 mi
