= New York State Route 224 =

Highway in New York

New York State Route 224
- Map of Southern Tier in New York with NY 224 highlighted in red

Route information
- Maintained by NYSDOT
- Length: 19.77 mi (31.82 km)
- Existed: 1930–present

Major junctions
- West end: NY 14 in Montour Falls
- East end: NY 34 in Van Etten

Location
- Country: United States
- State: New York
- Counties: Schuyler, Chemung

Highway system
- New York Highways; Interstate; US; State; Reference; Parkways
← NY 223	→ NY 225

New York State Route 224 (NY 224) is a 19.77-mile-long (31.82 km) state highway in the Southern Tier of New York in the United States. The route is signed as north–south; however, in actuality the highway follows more of an east–west routing across southeastern Schuyler County and northeastern Chemung County. The western terminus of the route is at an intersection with NY 14 in the village of Montour Falls southeast of Seneca Lake and its eastern terminus is at a junction with NY 34 in the village of Van Etten.

== Route description ==
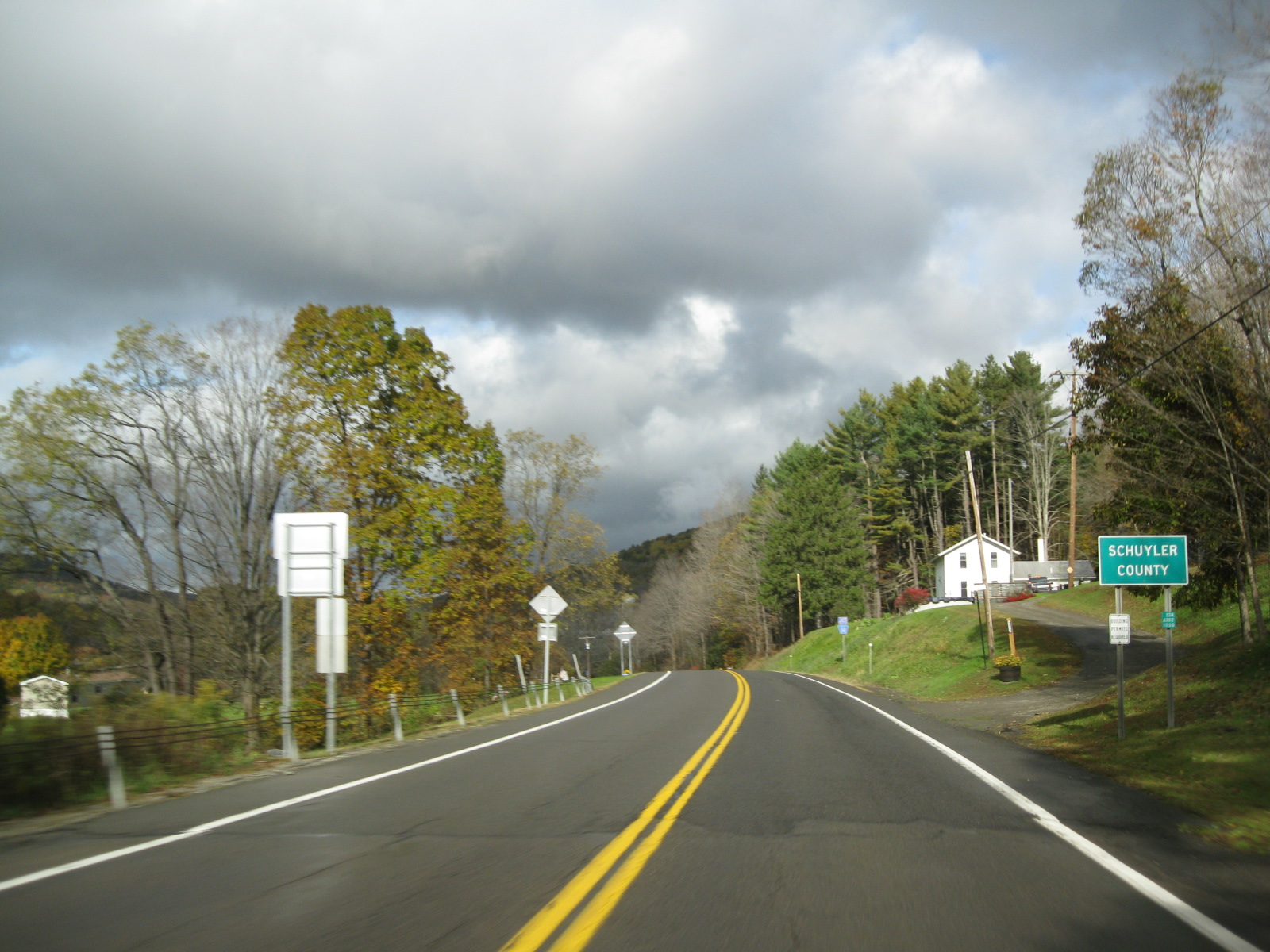
NY 224 west at the Schuyler–Chemung county line in Van Etten

NY 224 begins at an intersection with NY 14 (North Catharine Street) in the village of Montour Falls. NY 224 proceeds eastward along Clawson Boulevard, a two-lane commercial street through Montour Falls. After crossing a creek, the route makes a bend eastward, crossing an intersection with County Route 8 (CR 8; Skyline Valley Drive), where it turns southeast. A short distance into the bend, NY 224 leaves the village of Montour Falls for the town of Montour and drops the moniker of Clawson Boulevard. NY 224 becomes a two-lane rural roadway, crossing a valley via a long bridge before bending eastward once again near Havana Glen Road. After Havana Glen, NY 224 becomes a residential through street in Montour, intersecting with Speedway Road, where it enters the village of Odessa.

In Odessa, NY 224 bends northeast near Speedway Road, gaining the West Main Street moniker. NY 224 runs along the northern end of the village, passing north of the combined buildings of H.A. Hanlon Elementary School and Odessa-Montour Junior/Senior High school, both part of the Odessa-Montour Central School, and intersecting with the village continuation of CR 15 (Church Street) at the center of town. After Church Street, NY 224 continues east through Odessa, crossing under a former railroad right-of-way and intersects with the southern terminus of NY 228 (Mecklenburg Road). After NY 228, NY 224 bends southeast and out of the village, entering the town of Catharine. Through Catherine, NY 224 parallels the railroad right-of-way as a two-lane farm road, intersecting with the southern terminus of CR 10. NY 224 continues winding southeast, intersecting with CR 11 twice, once via a spur road and once directly in the hamlet of Alpine.

Through Alpine, NY 224 is a two-lane residential street, paralleling homes in both directions before leaving at the second intersection with CR 11. After departing Alpine, NY 224 bends even further to the south, crossing the railroad right-of-way once again, entering the hamlet of Alpine Junction. In Alpine Junction, NY 224 intersects with NY 13 at-grade. After Alpine Junction, NY 224 and the railroad grade continue southeast, entering the town of Cayuta. Entering the hamlet of Cayuta a short distance after, NY 224 becomes a two-lane industrial highway, intersecting with the southern terminus of CR 12 (Cayuta Road), which connects to the Tompkins County line and becomes CR 135. After the hamlet of Cayuta, NY 224 bends southward once again, remaining a two-lane forest highway.

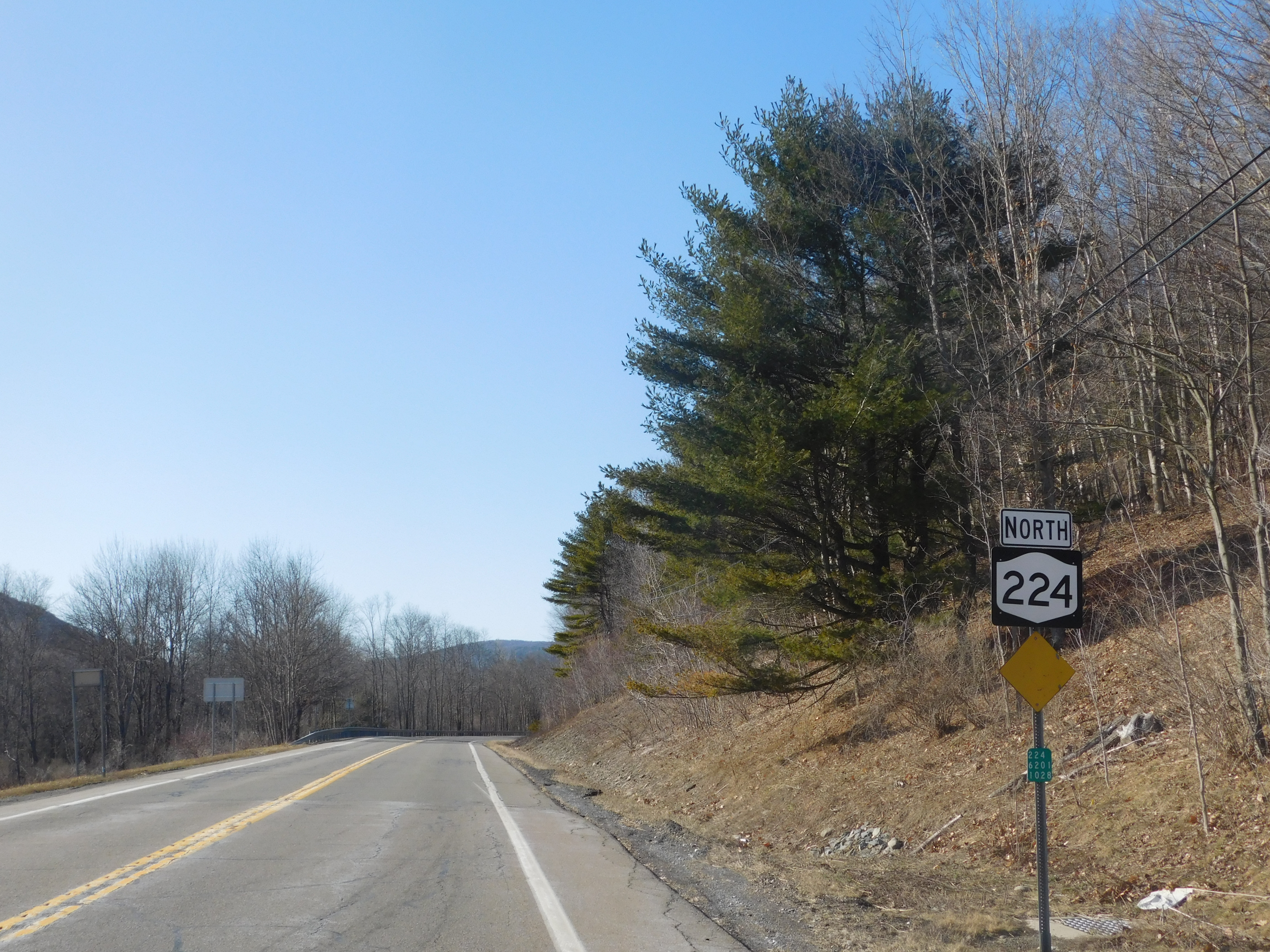
NY 224 west, signed as cardinal north, through the town of Van Etten

After a bend near the railroad grade, NY 224 proceeds eastward through Cayuta, passing spurious homes as it winds through the town. NY 224 intersects with CR 13's southern terminus just before crossing the county line into Chemung County. After crossing the county line into Chemung County, NY 224 now enters of the town of Van Etten. The route continues southeast, intersecting with CR 48 (McDuffy Hollow Road)'s southern terminus. Paralleling the railroad grade further, NY 224 soon intersects with the northern terminus of CR 14 (Swartwood Drive), which connects NY 224 to the hamlet of Swartwood.

NY 224 continues southeast through Van Etten, where it intersects with the eastern terminus of NY 223. Paralleling the old railroad grade, NY 224 proceeds southeast as a two-lane farm road until an intersection with the terminus of CR 3 (Wyncoop Creek Road). After this intersection, NY 224 enters the village of Van Etten, where it becomes a two-lane residential street. After intersecting with CR 62, NY 224 makes a bend to the east, where it crosses CR 13 (Langford Street) before intersecting with NY 34 (Gee Street). The intersection with NY 34 serves as the eastern terminus of NY 224, as the right-of-way continues east to the Tioga County line as NY 34.

== History ==
NY 224 was assigned as part of the 1930 renumbering of state highways in New York. Initially, the route began at NY 14 in Montour Falls and ended at NY 223 near the hamlet of Swartwood. From there, NY 223 continued east through the village of Van Etten to the village of Candor over what was previously designated as part of NY 53 from the mid-1920s to 1930. NY 223 was truncated in the early 1950s to end at NY 224 in Swartwood. The former routing of NY 223 from Swartwood to Van Etten became an extension of NY 224.

== Major intersections ==
County	Location	mi	km	Destinations	Notes
Schuyler	Montour Falls	0.00	0.00	NY 14 (North Catharine Street) – Watkins Glen, Elmira	Western terminus
Schuyler	Odessa	3.71	5.97	NY 228 north – Mecklenburg	Southern terminus of NY 228
Schuyler	Cayuta	8.59	13.82	NY 13 – Ithaca, Horseheads	Hamlet of Alpine Junction
Chemung	Town of Van Etten	17.03	27.41	NY 223 west – Erin, Breesport	Eastern terminus of NY 223
Chemung	Town of Van Etten	19.77	31.82	NY 34 (Gee Street) – Spencer, Waverly	Eastern terminus; hamlet of Van Etten
1.000 mi = 1.609 km; 1.000 km = 0.621 mi
