= Verona Beach, New York =

- Hamlet
- Location within New York Location within the United States
- Coordinates: 43°11′27″N 75°43′45″W
- Country: United States
- State: New York
- County: Oneida
- Elevation: 374 ft (114 m)
- Time zone: UTC-5 (Eastern (EST))
  - Summer (DST): UTC-4 (EDT)
- ZIP code: 13162
- Area code: 607
- GNIS feature ID: 968504

Verona Beach is a hamlet in Oneida County, New York, United States. The community is located along the eastern shore of Oneida Lake and New York State Route 13; the Erie Canal separates the community from neighboring Sylvan Beach. Verona Beach has a post office with ZIP code 13162. Verona Beach State Park is located in the community.
