= New York State Route 223 =

State highway in Chemung County, New York, US

New York State Route 223
- Map of Chemung County and vicinity with NY 223 highlighted in red

Route information
- Maintained by NYSDOT
- Length: 12.54 mi (20.18 km)
- Existed: 1930–present

Major junctions
- West end: NY 13 in Horseheads
- East end: NY 224 in Van Etten

Location
- Country: United States
- State: New York
- Counties: Chemung

Highway system
- New York Highways; Interstate; US; State; Reference; Parkways
← NY 222	→ NY 224

New York State Route 223 (NY 223) is an east–west state highway in Chemung County, New York, in the United States. It extends for 12.5 miles (20.1 km) from an intersection with NY 13 northeast of the city of Elmira in the town of Horseheads to a junction with NY 224 in the town of Van Etten. In between, NY 223 passes through the town of Erin and serves the hamlet of the same name within the town. The route initially continued east to the village of Candor when it was assigned as part of the 1930 renumbering of state highways in New York; however, it was cut back to its current length in the early 1950s.

== Route description ==
NY 223 begins at an intersection with NY 13 and County Route 68 (Old Ithaca Road) in the town of Horseheads. It progresses to the southeast as Breesport Road, passing a local mobile home park, which leads to a stretch of standalone homes in the middle of otherwise undeveloped fields. This backdrop follows NY 223 for a distance as it winds its way through Horseheads. However, the alignment straightens out as it enters the hamlet of Breesport. Through Breesport, the highway passes by closely spaced residences and commercial businesses as it becomes Main Street for a short distance. In downtown Breesport, NY 223 intersects with the northern terminus of CR 1 (Church Street) before curving southeast and out of town. The backdrop initially remains similar to the way the route entered Breesport, namely a mix of fields and residential homes; however, the highway soon bends to the northeast and enters the rural town of Erin.

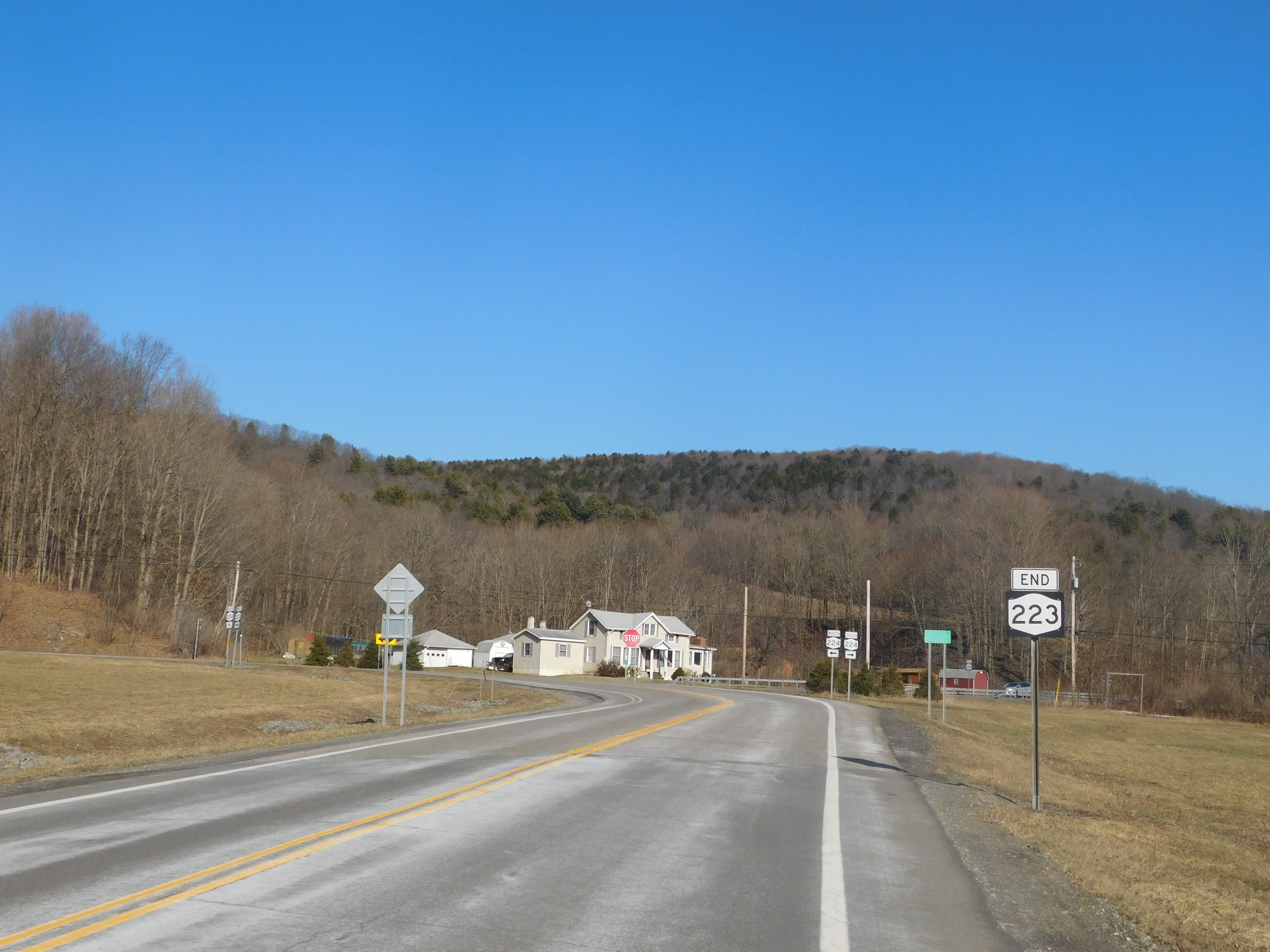
NY 223 east at its end in Van Etten

The road continues its slow northeastern progression until a fork at CR 37 (Fairview Road), where it darts northeastward at a shorter angle. NY 223 soon turns eastward, entering the hamlet of Erin. In Erin, it serves the southern terminus of CR 38 (Laurel Hill Road) and soon turns northward on a right-of-way served by CR 4 (Marsh Road). NY 223 soon leaves Erin and becomes known as Swartwood Hill Road, as which it turns to the northeast through fields, residences and woods. After the intersection with Drake Road, the route rises in elevation using switchbacks up Swartwood Hill, where the alignment heads through a dense wooded area. After winding its way out of the forest, NY 223 ends up in the town of Van Etten and its hamlet of Swartwood. There, the route turns eastward on a right-of-way taken from CR 14 (Swartwood Road). At an intersection with nearby CR 24 (Decker Road), NY 223 darts northeast to cross a railroad alignment and reach its east end at an intersection with NY 224.

== History ==
The east–west highway between the town of Horseheads and the village of Candor by way of the villages of Van Etten and Spencer was originally designated as NY 53 in the mid-1920s. NY 53 was renumbered to NY 223 as part of the 1930 renumbering of state highways in New York. NY 223 was truncated to its junction with NY 224 northwest of Van Etten in the early 1950s. The former routing of NY 223 southeastward to Van Etten became an extension of NY 224 while the Spencer–Candor portion became a realignment of NY 96. From Van Etten to Spencer, the road remained part of NY 34, which NY 223 had overlapped.

== Major intersections ==
The entire route is in Chemung County.

Location	mi	km	Destinations	Notes
Town of Horseheads	0.00	0.00	NY 13	Western terminus; roundabout
Town of Van Etten	12.54	20.18	NY 224 – Van Etten, Watkins Glen	Eastern terminus
1.000 mi = 1.609 km; 1.000 km = 0.621 mi
