= New York State Route 13 =

Highway in New York

New York State Route 13
- Map of central New York with NY 13 highlighted in red, and 13A in blue

Route information
- Maintained by NYSDOT and the city of Ithaca
- Length: 152.30 mi (245.10 km)
- Existed: 1924–present

Major junctions
- South end: I-86 / NY 17 / Southern Tier Expressway in Horseheads
- NY 34 / NY 79 / NY 96 in Ithaca; I-81 in Cortland; US 20 in Cazenovia; I-90 Toll / New York Thruway in Canastota; NY 69 in Camden; I-81 in Pulaski; US 11 in Pulaski
- North end: NY 3 in Richland

Location
- Country: United States
- State: New York
- Counties: Chemung, Schuyler, Tompkins, Cortland, Madison, Oneida, Oswego

Highway system
- New York Highways; Interstate; US; State; Reference; Parkways
← NY 12F	→ NY 14

New York State Route 13 (NY 13) is a state highway that runs mainly north–south for 152.30 miles (245.10 km) between NY 14 in Horseheads and NY 3 west of Pulaski in Central New York in the United States. In between, NY 13 intersects with Interstate 81 (I-81) in Cortland and Pulaski and meets the New York State Thruway (I-90) in Canastota. NY 13 is co-signed with several routes along its routing, most notably NY 34 and NY 96 between Newfield and Ithaca; NY 80 between DeRuyter and Cazenovia; and NY 5 between Chittenango and Canastota.

The most heavily traveled section of the route is the 50-mile (80 km) northeast–southwest section between Horseheads and Cortland. Situated midway between the two locations is the city of Ithaca; here, a small section of NY 13 follows an expressway alignment around much of the city. Much of the route, however, is a two-lane highway that passes through rural areas. When NY 13 was originally assigned in the 1920s, it extended only from Elmira to Cazenovia. It was significantly extended in 1930, stretching from Lindley in the south to Richland in the north. The southern terminus was moved back to Elmira in the 1940s and has been located at various points in the city since then.

== Route description ==
=== Elmira to Ithaca ===
Up until 2006, NY 13 began at exit 54 on the Southern Tier Expressway (I-86) southeast of the village of Horseheads. However, as part of the Horseheads Bypass project, NY 13 was extended west into the village to NY 14 along the frontage roads for the expressway. North of I-86, NY 13 heads north through the town of Horseheads as a two-lane freeway before becoming a surface road, paralleling the eastern edge of the village to an intersection with NY 223 near the northern town line. As NY 13 passes out of Horseheads and into Veteran, the amount of development along the roadway becomes sparse, consisting of only small roadside hamlets.

A picture of NY 13 near Ithaca was included on the Voyager Golden Record

Just before exiting Chemung County, NY 13 turns northeast toward the city of Ithaca several miles to the northeast. The route soon enters the narrow southeastern extents of Schuyler County, where it intersects NY 224 before crossing county lines again, this time into Tompkins County. In the town of Newfield, NY 13 remains largely rural in nature, passing only one significant settlement—the Newfield hamlet of the same name, officially known as Newfield Hamlet—on its way to the town of Ithaca. Shortly after entering the town, the route meets with the concurrent routes of NY 34 and NY 96 at an interchange adjacent to Robert H. Treman State Park, becoming Elmira Road. Both routes join NY 13 north alongside the eastern edge of the park to NY 327, a road largely delimiting the northern extent of the park. The three routes proceed generally northeastward through the town of Ithaca to the vicinity of Buttermilk Falls State Park, where they intersect the south end of NY 13A, an alternate route of NY 13 through western Ithaca, near the former Tutelo village of Coreogonel at the confluence of Buttermilk Creek and the Cayuga Lake inlet. NY 13, NY 34, and NY 96 continue on, directly serving Buttermilk Falls State Park as they pass over the creek and inlet and enter the Ithaca city limits.

At West Clinton Street (NY 96B), the route splits into a one-way pair, with Meadow Street carrying northbound traffic and Fulton Street handling southbound traffic. Due to the configuration of the city street grid, NY 79 overlaps the three-route concurrency on Fulton Street for one block eastbound as it switches from West State Street to West Green Street; no such overlap exists westbound/northbound as NY 79 westbound remains on West Seneca Street, where NY 96 leaves NY 13/34 and joins NY 79. The one-way pair comes to an end near Hancock Street, at which point both directions of the route merge into Meadow Street and continue northeastward through the city as an at-grade roadway. At Dey Street, however, the road becomes a limited-access highway as it heads through the northern extents of the city and partially alongside Cayuga Lake.

Near the northern city line, the roadway connects to East Shore Drive by way of an interchange, at which point NY 34 leaves the expressway to follow East Shore Drive along the lakeshore. NY 13 and NY 34 follow parallel routings into Lansing, where NY 13 curves eastward to interchange with both Cayuga Heights Road and Triphammer Road. Southwest of Ithaca Tompkins International Airport, NY 13 downgrades into a divided highway and meets Warren Road at-grade before reverting into a two-lane roadway as it passes south of the airport and exits the Ithaca area.

=== Ithaca to Lenox ===
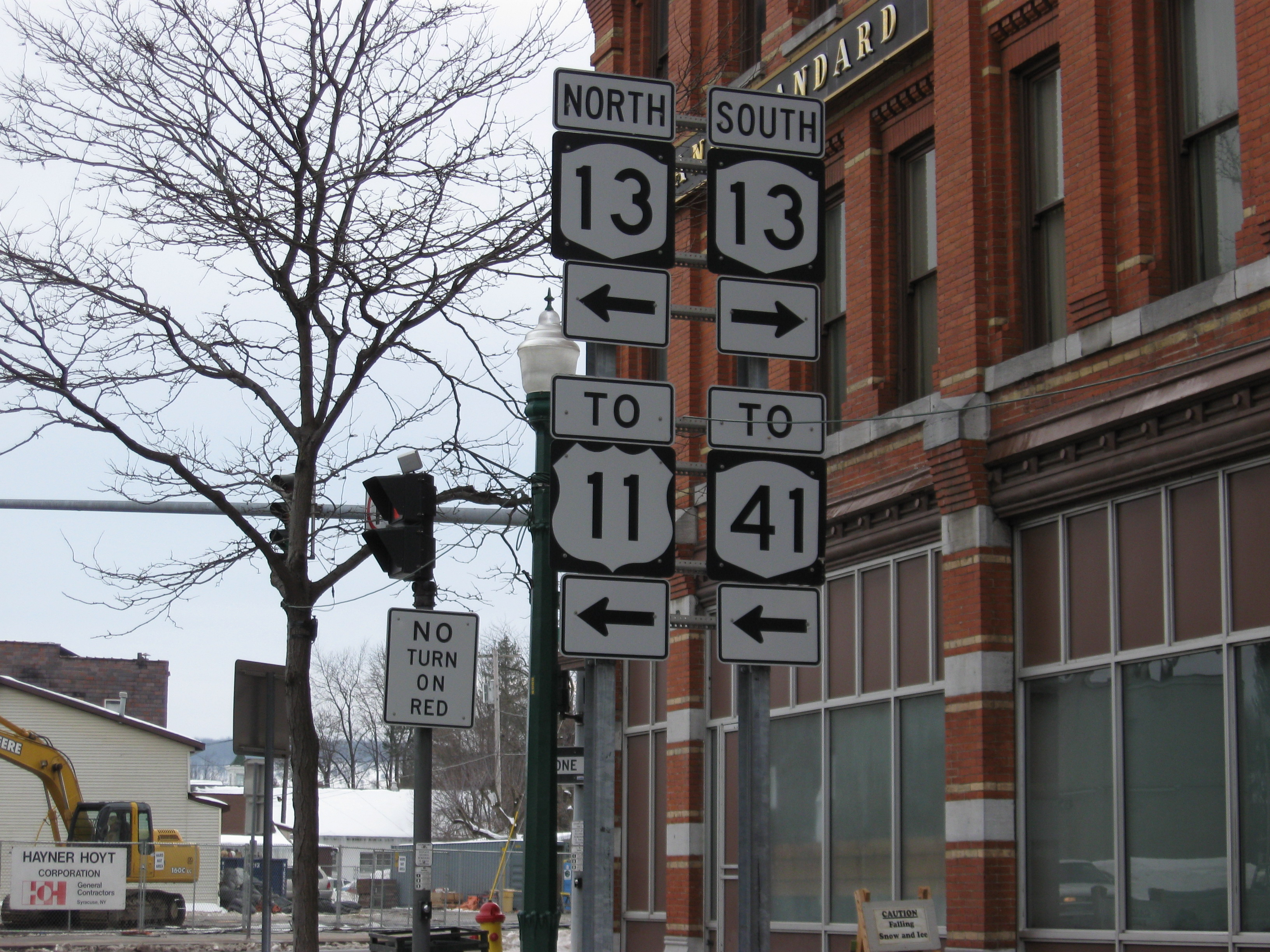
Sign assembly for NY 13 in Cortland

NY 13 progresses southeast through western Dryden to meet Dryden Road (NY 366), a street originating in eastern Ithaca. NY 366 joins NY 13 northeast along Fall Creek for little more than 1 mile (1.6 km) before splitting; however, the Dryden Road name remains with NY 13 into the village of Dryden. At the village center, NY 13 meets both NY 38 and NY 392. NY 13 turns north, overlapping NY 38 for three blocks and passing Tompkins Cortland Community College as it exits the village limits on Cortland Road.

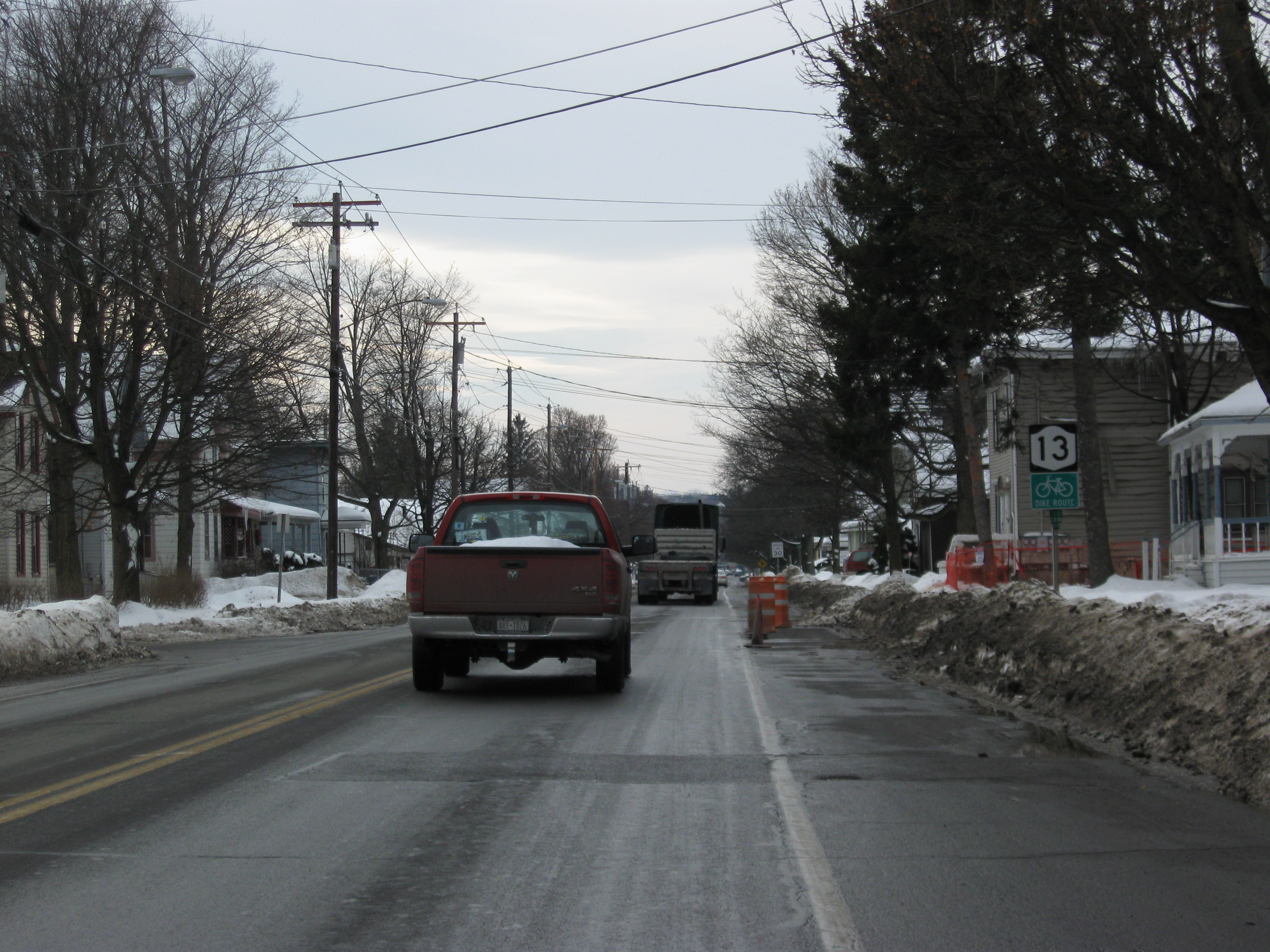
NY 13 southbound as it approaches downtown Cortland.

At the Tompkins-Cortland County line, NY 13 loses the Cortland Road moniker and becomes unnamed as it heads toward Cortland. Southwest of the city limits, NY 13 breaks to the northeast, with its north-northeastward alignment continuing onward as NY 281. In Cortland, NY 13 becomes Tompkins Street and meets NY 215 (Owego Street) three blocks from an intersection with the overlapping routes of U.S. Route 11 (US 11) and NY 41 at Church Street. All three routes turn north onto Church, creating a three-route overlap that lasts for three blocks through downtown Cortland. At Clinton Road, US 11 and NY 41 turn west while NY 13 curves east for several blocks to an interchange with I-81 at the northeastern edge of the city's downtown district. Here, the Tioughnioga River splits, with NY 13 following the eastern branch northeast out of the Cortland city limits.

NY 13 continues northeast along the banks of the Tioughnioga through Truxton, where it intersects the southern terminus of NY 91, to the hamlet of Cuyler in the town of the same name. Here, the river downgrades to a creek as the route turns eastward toward Madison County. Upon crossing the county line, NY 13 enters the village of DeRuyter, located in the town of the same name, as Cortland Street. In the village center, NY 13 turns left onto Utica Street and follows the roadway out of the village.

Outside of the village, NY 13 follows a largely northeast–southwest alignment as it passes through the hamlet of Puckerville (centered around the junction between NY 13 and East Lake Road, a local roadway following the eastern edge of the DeRuyter Reservoir), to Sheds, a small hamlet marked by the intersection of NY 13 and NY 80. NY 13 turns north, overlapping NY 80 north for 3 miles (5 km) to the Cazenovia community of New Woodstock, where NY 13 leaves NY 80 at the western fringe of the hamlet.

NY 13 heads north to the village of Cazenovia, located at the southeastern tip of Cazenovia Lake. Within the village limits, NY 13 overlaps US 20 on Forman and Albany Streets before continuing north out of the village on Farnham and Sweetland Streets. Outside of the village, the street becomes known as Gorge Road and enters a roughly 100 feet (30 m) ravine surrounding the Chittenango Creek. As NY 13 progresses northward, the gorge deepens, reaching approximately 300 feet (91 m) within Chittenango Falls State Park. North of the park, the gorge widens laterally and continues to drop in elevation, with the difference between the surrounding terrain and NY 13 reaching almost 500 feet (150 m) as it intersects NY 5 in southeastern Chittenango. The two routes overlap, following Genesee Street north for several blocks before turning east and paralleling the former Erie Canal out of the village.

The two routes remain conjoined until Canastota, a village located in the town of Lenox, where NY 13 breaks from NY 5 and resumes its northward progression. North of the village center, NY 13 meets the New York State Thruway (I-90) at exit 34 before exiting Canastota. At the southeastern corner of Oneida Lake, NY 13 intersects NY 31. Just north of NY 31, NY 13 crosses over the Oneida River and enters Oneida County.

=== Oneida and Oswego counties ===
Between the county line and NY 49, NY 13 follows the eastern edge of Oneida Lake as it proceeds northward through the towns of Verona and Vienna. In Verona, NY 13 passes through the center of Verona Beach State Park and serves the lakeside community of Verona Beach, located adjacent to where the Erie Canal exits Oneida Lake. NY 13 crosses over the canal shortly afterward, passing into the Vienna community of Sylvan Beach in the process. Development along NY 13 continues as far north as Edgewater Beach, where NY 13 breaks from the lakeshore and continues north to meet NY 49. NY 13 turns east, overlapping NY 49 into the hamlet of Vienna.

In the center of Vienna, NY 13 leaves NY 49 and continues northward through the hamlet of McConnellsville (where NY 13 is joined by the west branch of Fish Creek) to the village of Camden, where NY 69 overlaps NY 13 for two blocks through the heart of the village. Past Camden, NY 13 continues northwest along Fish Creek into the Oswego County town of Williamstown, where NY 13 leaves the waterway and intersects NY 183 and NY 104.

NY 13 continues onward through rural central Oswego County to the village of Pulaski, which is in the town of Richland, where the route connects to southbound I-81 by way of a half-interchange just outside the village and intersects US 11 near the center of Pulaski. The route continues west for another 3 miles (5 km) before terminating at NY 3 in the hamlet of Port Ontario, which is also in the town of Richland.

== History ==
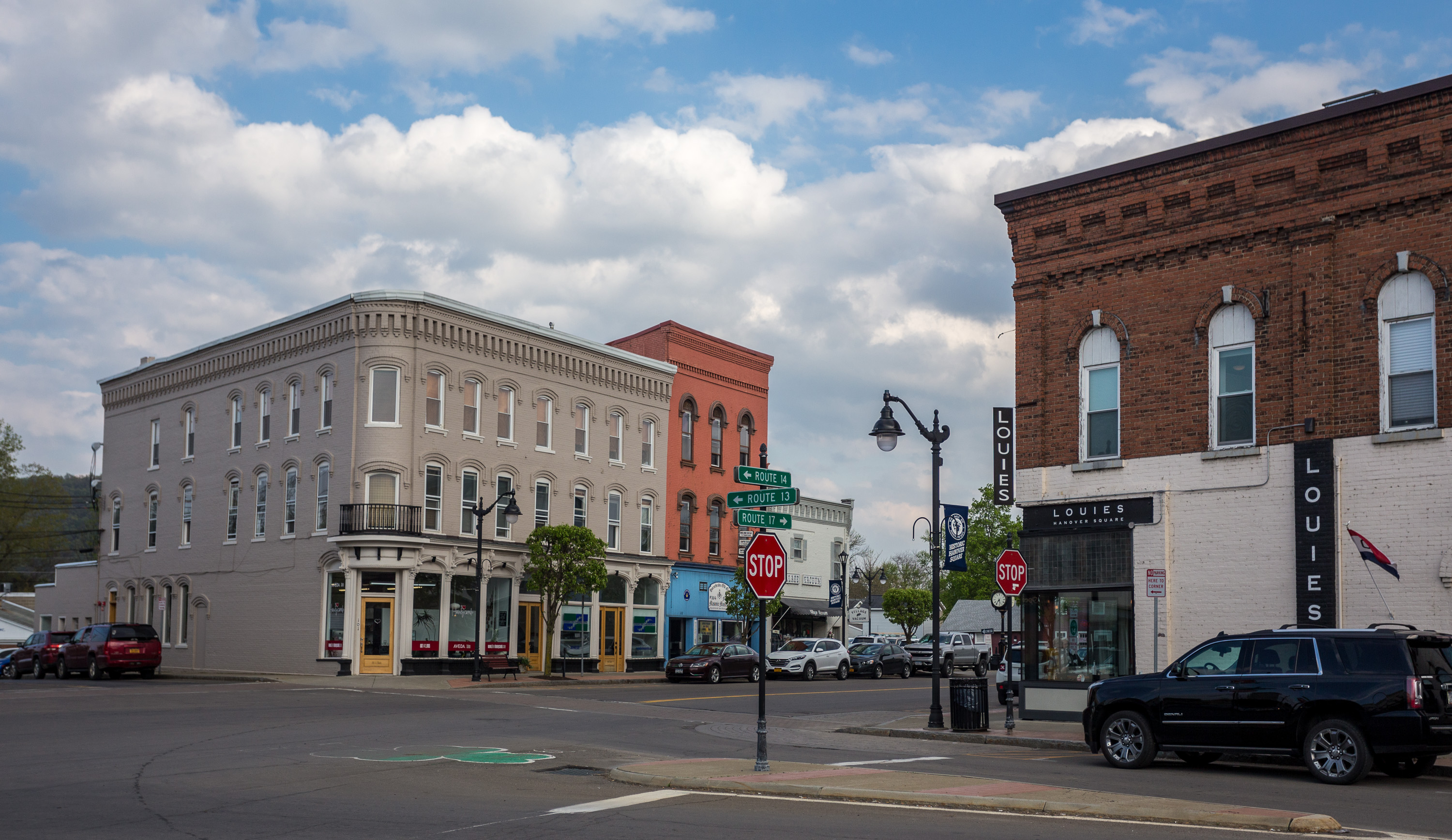
Route 13 in downtown Horseheads

=== Early routing ===
When state highways in New York were first publicly signed in 1924, NY 13 was assigned only to the portion of its modern routing between Elmira and Cazenovia. Within the Elmira area, NY 13 initially followed a different routing, beginning at the intersection of Lake Street and Water Street (then NY 17) on the north bank of the Chemung River in downtown Elmira. The route then overlapped NY 14 along Lake Street to Horseheads, where NY 13 split from NY 14 and headed northeast on Old Ithaca Road to what is now the intersection between NY 13 and NY 223. Here, NY 13 turned north, following its current alignment toward Ithaca.

In the 1930 renumbering of state highways in New York, NY 13 was extended over previously unnumbered roadways on both ends of its alignment, but unlike most routes in the state, it retained the same number along its original route. To the south, NY 13 was extended along Water Street (modern NY 352) to West Elmira, and on what is now NY 225 west to Caton. Past Caton, NY 13 continued west to NY 2 (now US 15) in Lindley by way of Tannery Creek Road, River Road, and Morgan Creek Road (collectively modern County Route 120). In the north, NY 13 was extended northward along its modern routing to NY 3C (modern NY 3) west of Pulaski. By 1940, the portion of NY 13 between Horseheads and Elmira became part of a realigned NY 17.

=== Realignments and truncation ===
The portion of NY 13 west of Elmira was removed from the state highway system in the early 1940s. NY 13 was truncated back to its original terminus at Water Street in downtown Elmira even though all of NY 13 south of Horseheads was concurrent with NY 17. NY 17 was moved onto its current alignment east of the city in the late 1950s; NY 13 was realigned south of NY 223 c. 1961 to follow a new road leading to a newly constructed interchange with NY 17.

In the mid-1980s, the Sullivanville Dam project forced a portion of the route to be rerouted northeast of Horseheads. Due to the elevated water level caused by the dam, the route had to be moved to higher ground west of the hamlet of Sullivanville in the Town of Veteran. A section of the old highway remains under the impounded water. Another section north of the dam exists as an extension of Sullivanville Road.

In 2007, with the completion of the I-86 project, NY 13 was extended westward along the parallel collector/distributor roads to NY 14 in Horseheads. Prior to the project's completion, at least one "NY 13 south" sign assembly was exposed along the westbound frontage road leading from exit 54 (NY 13). Several similarly shaped signs on similar sign assemblies were covered along the route.

=== Routing through Ithaca ===
When NY 13 was first assigned, it entered the city of Ithaca on Spencer Road and followed Spencer and Cayuga Streets into downtown. From there, NY 13 proceeded generally northeastward on Court and Linn Streets, University Avenue, and Forest Home Drive through the Cornell University campus to Dryden Road, where it turned eastward toward Dryden. NY 13 was realigned c. 1936 to bypass the Cornell University grounds to the south on State (NY 79) and Mitchell Streets and Ithaca and Dryden Roads. Its old alignment through the college became NY 392.

In the early 1960s, a new expressway was built along the eastern shore of Cayuga Lake, bypassing downtown Ithaca on the west and north. NY 13 was altered to follow Meadow Street and the freeway between southwestern Ithaca and the town of Dryden, while the portion of NY 13's old routing that did not overlap NY 79 became an extension of NY 366. The freeway was expected to be continued all the way to Cortland, but was abandoned with the completion of the existing segment of the highway; the remaining connection to the old NY 13 was completed as a two-lane roadway. The new expressway was pictured on the Voyager Golden Record as an example of a "modern highway." In 1996, ten blocks of southbound NY 13 was diverted from Meadow Street to Fulton Street as part of the Octopus elimination project.

== Major intersections ==
County	Location	mi	km	Destinations	Notes
Chemung	Town of Horseheads	0.00	0.00	I-86 / NY 17 / Southern Tier Expressway – Elmira, Binghamton, Corning, Horseheads	Southern terminus; exit 54 on I-86
Chemung	Town of Horseheads			Northern end of freeway section	
Chemung	Town of Horseheads	2.78	4.47	NY 223 east – Breesport	Western terminus of NY 223; roundabout
Schuyler	Cayuta	11.64	18.73	NY 224 – Odessa, Van Etten	
Tompkins	Town of Ithaca	23.65	38.06	NY 34 south / NY 96 south (West Danby Road) – Spencer	Southern terminus of NY 13 / NY 34 and NY 13 / NY 96 overlaps
Tompkins	Town of Ithaca	24.15	38.87	NY 327 north (Enfield Falls Road)	Southern terminus of NY 327
Tompkins	Town of Ithaca	25.22	40.59	NY 13A north (Five Mile Drive)	Southern terminus of NY 13A
Tompkins	City of Ithaca	27.31	43.95	NY 96B south – Ithaca College	Northern terminus of NY 96B
Tompkins	City of Ithaca	27.43	44.14	NY 79 east (West Green Street) – Downtown, Cornell University	Southern terminus of NY 13 / NY 79 overlap (southbound)
Tompkins	City of Ithaca	27.55	44.34	NY 79 west (West Seneca Street)	Northern terminus of NY 13 / NY 79 overlap (southbound)
Tompkins	City of Ithaca	27.63	44.47	NY 89 north / NY 96 north (West Buffalo Street)	Northern terminus of NY 13 / NY 96 overlap; southern terminus of NY 89
Tompkins	Town of Ithaca	29.24	47.06	NY 34 north (East Shore Road) – Stewart Park, Auburn / East Shore Drive ( NY 930F south)	Northern terminus of NY 13 / NY 34 overlap; diamond interchange; northern terminus of unsigned NY 930F
Tompkins	Lansing			Cayuga Heights Road – Lansing, Cayuga Heights	Partial cloverleaf interchange; former routing of NY 34A
Tompkins	Lansing	31.21	50.23	North Triphammer Road – Lansing, Cayuga Heights	Diamond interchange
Tompkins	Town of Dryden	35.32	56.84	NY 366 west	Western terminus of NY 13 / NY 366 overlap
Tompkins	Town of Dryden	36.55	58.82	NY 366 east – Freeville, Groton, Etna	Eastern terminus of NY 13 / NY 366 overlap
Tompkins	Village of Dryden	41.28	66.43	NY 38 south / NY 392 east – Owego	Southern terminus of NY 13 / NY 38 overlap; western terminus of NY 392
Tompkins	Village of Dryden	41.81	67.29	NY 38 north – Freeville, Groton	Northern terminus of NY 13 / NY 38 overlap
Cortland	Cortlandville	48.76	78.47	NY 281 north – Syracuse	Southern terminus of NY 281; hamlet of Munsons Corners
Cortland	Cortland	50.93	81.96	NY 215 south	Northern terminus of NY 215
Cortland	Cortland	51.34	82.62	US 11 south / NY 41 south	Southern terminus of US 11 / NY 13 / NY 41 overlap
Cortland	Cortland	51.65	83.12	US 11 north / NY 41 north / NY 222 west – Downtown	Northern terminus of US 11 / NY 13 / NY 41 overlap; eastern terminus of NY 222
Cortland	Cortland	52.41	84.35	I-81 – Syracuse, Binghamton	Exit 11 on I-81
Cortland	Truxton	62.98	101.36	NY 91 north	Southern terminus of NY 91
Madison	Town of DeRuyter	76.24	122.70	NY 80 east – Georgetown	Southern terminus of NY 13 / NY 80 overlap; hamlet of Sheds
Madison	Town of Cazenovia	79.68	128.23	NY 80 west (Fabius Road) – Fabius	Northern terminus of NY 13 / NY 80 overlap; hamlet of New Woodstock
Madison	Village of Cazenovia	85.67	137.87	US 20 west – LaFayette	Southern terminus of US 20 / NY 13 overlap
Madison	Village of Cazenovia	86.26	138.82	US 20 east – Morrisville	Northern terminus of US 20 / NY 13 overlap
Madison	Chittenango	95.40	153.53	NY 5 west – Fayetteville	Western terminus of NY 5 / NY 13 overlap
Madison	Canastota	101.98	164.12	NY 5 east – Wampsville, Oneida	Eastern terminus of NY 5 / NY 13 overlap
Madison	Canastota	103.51	166.58	I-90 Toll / New York Thruway – Buffalo, Albany	Exit 34 on I-90 / Thruway
Madison	Lenox	108.59	174.76	NY 31 – Bridgeport, Verona	Roundabout; hamlet of South Bay
Oneida	Vienna	114.19	183.77	NY 49 west – Central Square, Fulton	Western terminus of NY 13 / NY 49 overlap; hamlet of North Bay
Oneida	Vienna	115.64	186.10	NY 49 east – Rome	Eastern terminus of NY 13 / NY 49 overlap; hamlet of Vienna
Oneida	Village of Camden	123.39	198.58	NY 69 west	Southern terminus of NY 13 / NY 69 overlap
Oneida	Village of Camden	123.49	198.74	NY 69 east – Rome	Northern terminus of NY 13 / NY 69 overlap
Oswego	Williamstown	133.25	214.45	NY 183 south	Northern terminus of NY 183; hamlet of Williamstown
Oswego	Williamstown	136.39	219.50	NY 104 west – Mexico, Oswego	Eastern terminus of NY 104
Oswego	Pulaski	148.37	238.78	I-81 – Syracuse, Watertown	Exit 125 on I-81
Oswego	Pulaski	149.14	240.02	US 11 to I-81 north	Access via Maple Avenue
Oswego	Richland	152.30	245.10	NY 3	Northern terminus; hamlet of Port Ontario
1.000 mi = 1.609 km; 1.000 km = 0.621 mi: Concurrency terminus; Electronic toll collection

== NY 13A ==
New York State Route 13A
- Location: Ithaca

NY 13A is a 2.08-mile (3.35 km) north–south spur that bypasses downtown Ithaca by way of the town of Ithaca to the southwest. The route begins at NY 13, NY 34 and NY 96 south of the city and follows the west bank of Cayuga Inlet and the Ithaca Flood Control Channel north into the city, where it ends at NY 79 in Ithaca's West End, an area once dominated by squatters' villages. The highway is named Floral Avenue within the city and Five Mile Drive in the town of Ithaca, so named because was part of a five-mile (8 km) long bypass around the Cayuga Inlet on the west side of Ithaca during high lake levels or river flooding. The eastern side of this bypass was the present-day Spencer Road. NY 13A was assigned c. 1938.

== See also ==
- List of county routes in Steuben County, New York
