= New York State Route 352 =

Highway in New York state

New York State Route 352
- Map of Southern Tier in New York with NY 352 highlighted in red

Route information
- Maintained by NYSDOT and the city of Elmira
- Length: 18.96 mi (30.51 km)
- Existed: October 1966–present

Major junctions
- West end: I-86 / NY 17 / Southern Tier Expressway / NY 415 in Riverside
- NY 414 in Corning; NY 14 in Elmira
- East end: I-86 / NY 17 / Southern Tier Expressway in Elmira

Location
- Country: United States
- State: New York
- Counties: Steuben, Chemung

Highway system
- New York Highways; Interstate; US; State; Reference; Parkways
← NY 351	→ NY 353
← NY 17D	NY 17E	→ NY 17F

New York State Route 352 (NY 352) is a state highway in the Southern Tier of New York in the United States. It generally parallels the Southern Tier Expressway (Interstate 86 or I-86 and NY 17) from the village of Riverside (exit 45) east through the city of Corning to the city of Elmira (exit 56). The portion of NY 352 west of the hamlet of Big Flats was once part of NY 17; the rest was originally New York State Route 17E. Construction of and improvements to the Southern Tier Expressway have resulted in extensions of NY 352, primarily along the former NY 17 right-of-way.

== Route description ==
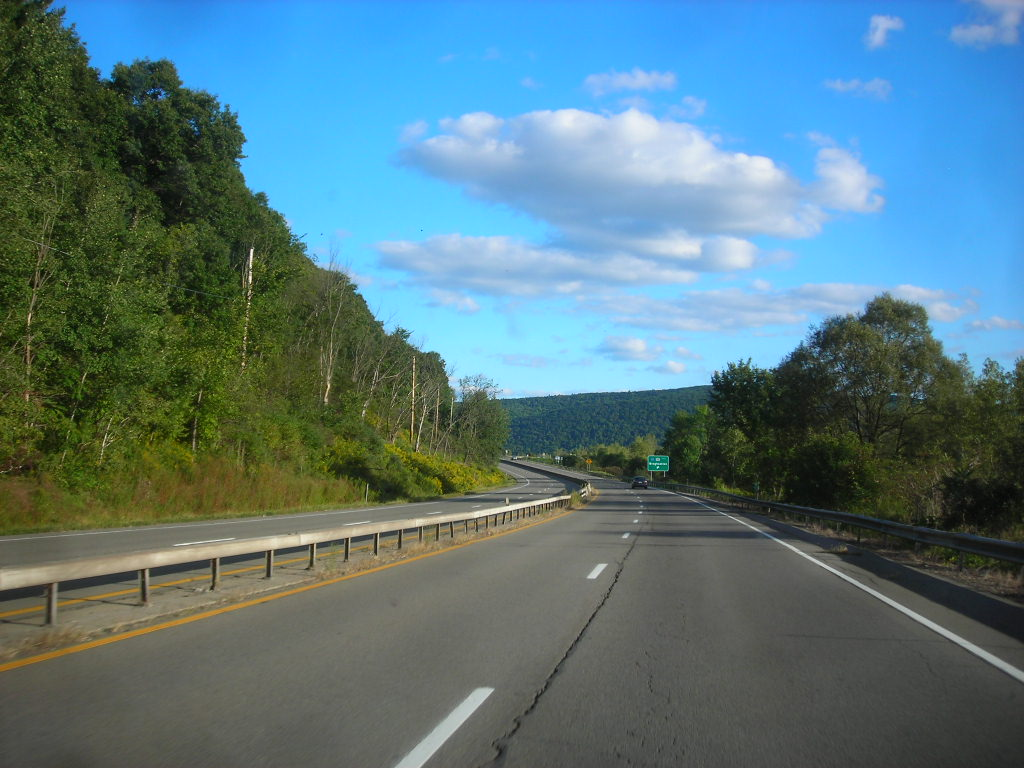
NY 352 proceeding through the town of Corning as a four-lane boulevard

NY 352 begins at an intersection with NY 415 (Pulteney Street) in village of Riverside. NY 352 proceeds southward along Buffalo Street, a two-lane commercial street for two blocks to an intersection with Denison Parkway. At the Denison Parkway intersection, NY 352 turns east along Denison, while to the west is an interchange with the I-86 and NY 17 (the Southern Tier Expressway). NY 352 now proceeds eastward on Denison Parkway, a four-lane boulevard alongside the Chemung River. After bending southeast and crossing into the Chemung, the route leaves the village of Riverside for the city of Corning.

Through Corning, NY 352 retains the Denison Parkway name, paralleling a former railroad right-of-way into the southern side of the city. The boulevard passes residences for several blocks, until intersecting with South Bridge Street, where it becomes a commercial road through Corning. Remaining four lanes, NY 352 continues east along Denison, passing the site of the former Corning station of the Erie Railroad, which closed in November 1952. Several blocks to the east, NY 352 intersects with the southern terminus of NY 414 (Cedar Street). NY 352 continues eastward through Corning, crossing businesses until Steuben Street, where residences begin appearing in either direction. A short distance to the east of that, NY 225 begins at an intersection with Conhocton Street, running southeast along Park Avenue.

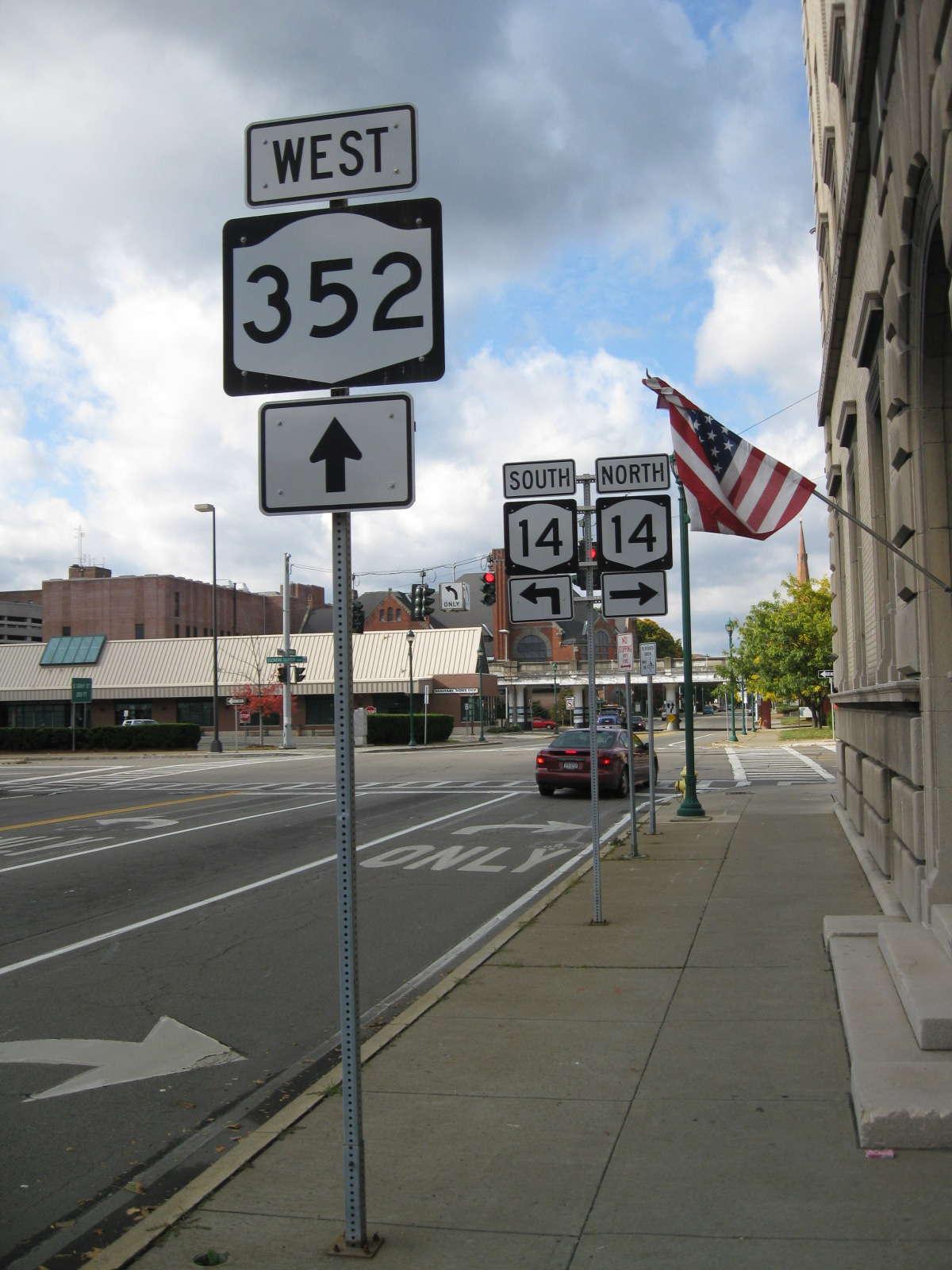
NY 352 heading westbound towards the intersection with NY 14 in Elmira

After NY 225, NY 352 continues east along Denison Parkway, remaining a four-lane boulevard through Corning. Passing south of a park, the route crosses the Chemung River once again, leaving the city of Corning for the hamlet of Gibson in the town of Corning. After crossing the river, NY 352 crosses over the Southern Tier Expressway and enters an interchange with County Route 45 (CR 45; Main Street). NY 352 then turns southward as East Corning Road, a four-lane boulevard that parallels the Southern Tier Expressway, interchanging via a bridge a short distance after. After the interchange, NY 352 passes the Corning Country Club,. then makes a gradual bend to the east, paralleling the Southern Tier and the alignment of the former Erie Railroad, now Norfolk Southern Railway's Southern Tier Line.

NY 352 proceeds eastward on East Corning Road, becoming a divided four-lane arterial, passing south of a quarry. Near Kings Court, NY 352 and the Southern Tier Expressway bend northeast, passing north of the ramp for exit 48. A short distance to the east, NY 352 turns southeast off East Corning Road and crosses over the Southern Tier once again, intersecting with the ramps for exit 48. The route then bends eastward, now a two-lane residential street through the town of Corning. The route soon crosses out of Corning near a power plant and crosses the county line (also the Preemption Line) into Chemung County and enters the town of Big Flats. NY 352 starts proceeding northeast through Big Flats, intersecting with the northern terminus of CR 10 (South Corning Road).

NY 352 continues northeast through Big Flats for several blocks, intersecting with CR 64 (Main Street). Passing south of the village of Big Flats, the route bends further to the southeast, passing Community Park until an intersection with CR 82 (Winters Road). Crossing through the town of Big Flats, NY 352 begins a long distance parallel with the Chemung River, turning southward for a distance before proceeding southeast again. A short distance from the southeastern curve, the route intersects with CR 55 (Harris Hill Road). Nearby this intersection is the National Soaring Museum. After an intersection with Curren Road, NY 352 runs north of a large residential community.

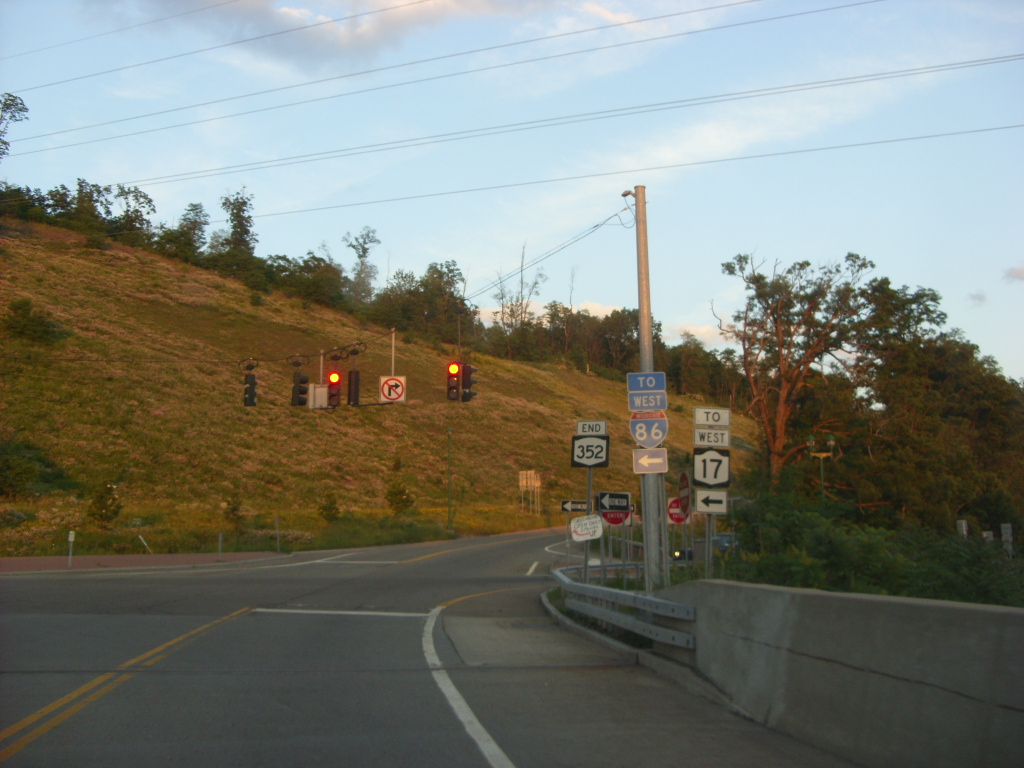
NY 352 eastbound at the interchange with NY 17 in Elmira. CR 1 begins in the distance.

After the residential section, NY 352 starts running alongside the Chemung River, bending southeast past some riverside homes before intersecting with the eastern terminus of NY 225 (Hendy Creek Road). After NY 225, NY 352 crosses the municipal line between the town of Big Flats and the city of Elmira. Now known as West Water Street, NY 352 becomes a four lane residential street through West Elmira. At the intersection with York and Coleman Avenues, the route forks into a divided roadway, with NY 352 east running along West Water Street and NY 352 west running along West Church Street. NY 352 east and West Water Street run through a residential section of West Elmira, bending east and passing homes for several blocks.

NY 352 east begins to bend northeast through Elmira, leaving the West Elmira section, remaining a two-lane residential street. The route returns to the Chemung River once again, passing north of Clinton Island. The route winds eastward, becoming a commercial street through the city, intersecting with South Main Street and Railroad Avenue. At Railroad Avenue, the Southern Tier Line crosses over the alignment from a bridge over the Chemung. Now known as East Water Street, NY 352 soon intersects with NY 14 (Clemens Center Parkway). NY 352 continues eastward for several blocks alongside the Chemung River, passing several baseball fields and industrial buildings, soon entering a diamond interchange (exit 56) with the Southern Tier Expressway (now just NY 17). This interchange serves as the eastern terminus of NY 352, where the right-of-way continues east of CR 1 (Jerusalem Hill Road).

== History ==
In the 1930 renumbering of state highways in New York, a spur of NY 17 between the hamlet of Big Flats and NY 13 in the town of Elmira was designated as NY 17E. At the time, NY 17 was routed on Main Street and Big Flats Road in the vicinity of Big Flats. NY 17E was extended eastward into Elmira in the early 1940s after NY 13 was truncated to a new southern terminus in downtown Elmira. At the time, both NY 13 and NY 17E ended at the junction of Church Street and Madison Avenue, the latter then part of NY 17. NY 17E was extended slightly by 1953 to continue east along Church Street to Sullivan Street and southward on Sullivan Street to Water Street (NY 17).

A bypass for NY 17 in the Elmira area was built in the 1950s. The first section from Horseheads south to the eastern fringe of downtown Elmira was completed in the mid-1950s, resulting in a short eastern extension of NY 17E to the east side of Newtown Creek (exit 56). The second half of the bypass, from East Corning eastward to Horseheads, was open by 1958, and NY 17's original alignment from East Corning (exit 48) to Big Flats became a western extension of NY 17E. In October 1966, under pressure from locals to eliminate confusion between NY 17 east and NY 17E, the latter was renumbered to NY 352.

In the mid-1980s, the NY 17 bypass was extended west to NY 414 (exit 46) in Corning. NY 17 initially exited the expressway south of Gibson at exit 47 to rejoin its original surface alignment into Corning. Although the former routing of NY 17 between exits 47 and 48 lacked a designation, NY 352 was not immediately extended westward from exit 45. The Corning Bypass on NY 17 was completed in the mid-1990s, at which time NY 352 was extended west on the old surface NY 17 across the Gibson Bridge, through downtown Corning and across the Patterson Bridge to exit 45.

=== Downtown Elmira ===
NY 352 was reconfigured in Elmira by 1969 to split into two one-way streets in West Elmira. Westbound NY 352 followed Church Street through Elmira while eastbound NY 352 followed Water Street. Eastbound NY 352 left Water Street at Sullivan Street and followed Sullivan Street for three blocks north to Church Street. Here, NY 352 came back together and continued east along Church Street to NY 17 as a two-way street. By 1978, the portion of Sullivan Street between Water Street and John Street was removed. As a result, NY 352 now left Water Street at Madison Avenue and followed Madison north to Church Street. NY 352 eastbound was changed again by 1995 to follow Water Street east to NY 17.

In 2005, the portions of Church and Water Streets east of Hoffman Street were reconfigured to carry two-way traffic. However, NY 352 remains split along the two streets for historical reasons.

== Major intersections ==
County	Location	mi	km	Destinations	Notes
Steuben	Riverside	0.00	0.00	I-86 east / NY 17 east / Southern Tier Expressway / NY 415 (High Street)	Western terminus
Steuben	Riverside	0.10	0.16	I-86 west / NY 17 west / Southern Tier Expressway west – Painted Post, Williamsport, Jamestown, Rochester	Exit 45 on I-86
Steuben	City of Corning	1.75	2.82	NY 414 north (Cedar Street) to I-86 / NY 17 / Southern Tier Expressway	Southern terminus of NY 414
Steuben	City of Corning	2.40	3.86	NY 225 south (Park Avenue)	Northern terminus of NY 225
Steuben	Town of Corning	3.86	6.21	I-86 / NY 17 / Southern Tier Expressway – Binghamton, Elmira, Corning	Access via NY 961Q; exit 47 on I-86
Steuben	Town of Corning	6.15– 6.20	9.90– 9.98	I-86 / NY 17 / Southern Tier Expressway – Jamestown, Binghamton	Exit 48 on I-86; hamlet of East Corning
Chemung	Town of Big Flats	14.35	23.09	NY 225 north (Hendy Creek Road) – Mount Savior, Caton	Southern terminus of NY 225
Chemung	City of Elmira	17.66	28.42	NY 14 (Clemens Center Parkway)	
Chemung	City of Elmira	18.96	30.51	I-86 / NY 17 / Southern Tier Expressway – Corning, Binghamton	Eastern terminus; exit 56 on I-86
1.000 mi = 1.609 km; 1.000 km = 0.621 mi

== See also ==
- New York State Route 417, the next piece of old NY 17 to the west
- New York State Route 17C, the next numbered piece of old NY 17 to the east
