= New York State Route 225 =

Highway in New York

New York State Route 225
- Map of Chemung and Steuben counties with NY 225 highlighted in red

Route information
- Maintained by NYSDOT and the city of Corning
- Length: 15.54 mi (25.01 km)
- Existed: January 1, 1949–present

Major junctions
- South end: NY 352 in Big Flats
- North end: NY 352 in Corning

Location
- Country: United States
- State: New York
- Counties: Chemung, Steuben

Highway system
- New York Highways; Interstate; US; State; Reference; Parkways
← NY 224	→ NY 226

New York State Route 225 (NY 225) is a state highway in the Southern Tier of New York in the United States. It is a 15.54-mile (25.01 km) loop route off NY 352 that connects the town of Big Flats (near the city of Elmira) and the city of Corning to the hamlet of Caton. The route begins in Big Flats and follows a generally east–west alignment across rural areas to Caton, where it turns to run in a north–south direction toward Corning. Development along the highway increases once it enters the Corning suburb of South Corning, and the rest of the route serves residential neighborhoods in South Corning and Corning. NY 225 is two lanes wide for its entire length; however, part of the highway in South Corning also has a center turn lane.

The Caton–Corning segment of the route was acquired by the state of New York in 1911 and designated as part of NY 44 (now NY 414) as part of the 1930 renumbering of state highways in New York. It received its current designation in 1949 when NY 414 was truncated to begin in Corning. The highway leading east from Caton to Big Flats was county-maintained from the 1930s through the 1970s, even though it had been part of NY 13 from the 1930 renumbering to the 1940s. The state of New York assumed maintenance of the highway by 1986, and the new state highway became an extension of NY 225.

== Route description ==
NY 225 begins at an intersection with NY 352 (West Water Street) in a residential area of the town of Big Flats, located 3 miles (5 km) west of the city of Elmira in southwest Chemung County. It heads southwest as the two-lane Hendy Creek Road to the Chemung River, which it crosses by way of the Fitch Bridge. On the opposite riverbank, NY 225 passes through the community of Golden Glow Heights as it turns to follow a more westerly routing into substantially less developed parts of the town. Over the next 4 miles (6.4 km), the route meanders along the Big Flats–Southport town line while running along the base of a narrow, remote valley surrounding Hendy Creek. Along the way, the highway meets the north end of County Route 36 (CR 36, named Dutch Hill Road). The creek valley ultimately leads to the Chemung–Steuben county line, where NY 225 becomes known as Hendy Hollow Road.

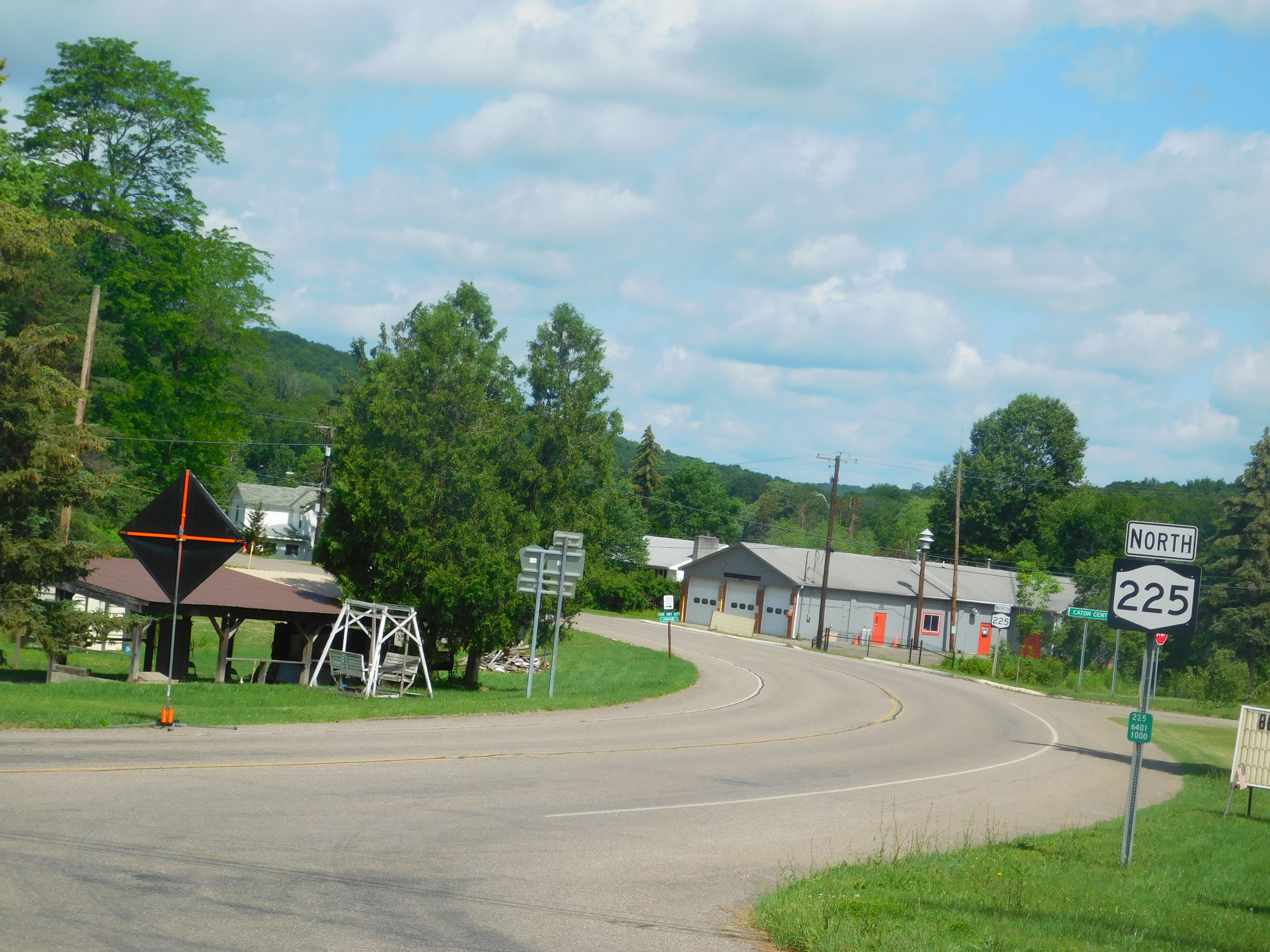
NY 225 northbound in Caton

Across the county line in the town of Caton, NY 225 continues west through the gully for another 2 miles (3.2 km), slowly rising in elevation as it heads past a small number of isolated homes. The creek reaches its source near NY 225's junction with the southern terminus of CR 34 (Whiskey Creek Road), at which point the route ascends out of the valley and heads southwest across lightly developed, relatively level terrain to the small hamlet of Caton. In the center of the community, NY 225 intersects CR 32 (Caton–Seeley Creek Road) and CR 120 (Tannery Creek Road). NY 225 turns northwest at this intersection, becoming Caton Road as it follows Caton Creek out of the hamlet.

The change in direction brings the route into another rural valley, which follows a winding, generally northward course for 4 miles (6 km). As the highway runs along the gully, it meets CR 40A (West Caton Road) at a junction just south of the Caton–Corning town line and the north end of CR 34 at an intersection a half-mile (0.8 km) north of the boundary. The Caton Creek valley eventually gives way to more open terrain as NY 225 re-approaches the Chemung River and reenters its surrounding valley. Here, the route transitions from a rural highway to a residential street as it enters the riverside village of South Corning. Caton Road terminates at the center of the village, with the route following a northeastward alignment for its last few blocks. NY 225 turns northwestward onto Park Avenue at this point, following the right-of-way established by River Road, a highway designated as CR 44 east of the village limits.

As Park Avenue, NY 225 is initially a two-lane road with a center turn lane. The route parallels the Chemung River to the Corning city line, where the center turn lane ends and the highway reverts to a two-lane undivided road. Within the city limits, NY 225 continues to serve mostly residential neighborhoods while traversing the southeastern part of the city. The route proceeds to the eastern edge of downtown Corning, at which point it veers north onto Conhocton Street. NY 225 ends just one block later at an intersection with Denison Parkway (NY 352). The 0.45 miles (0.72 km) of NY 225 within Corning are maintained by the city, while the rest of the route is maintained by the New York State Department of Transportation (NYSDOT).

== History ==
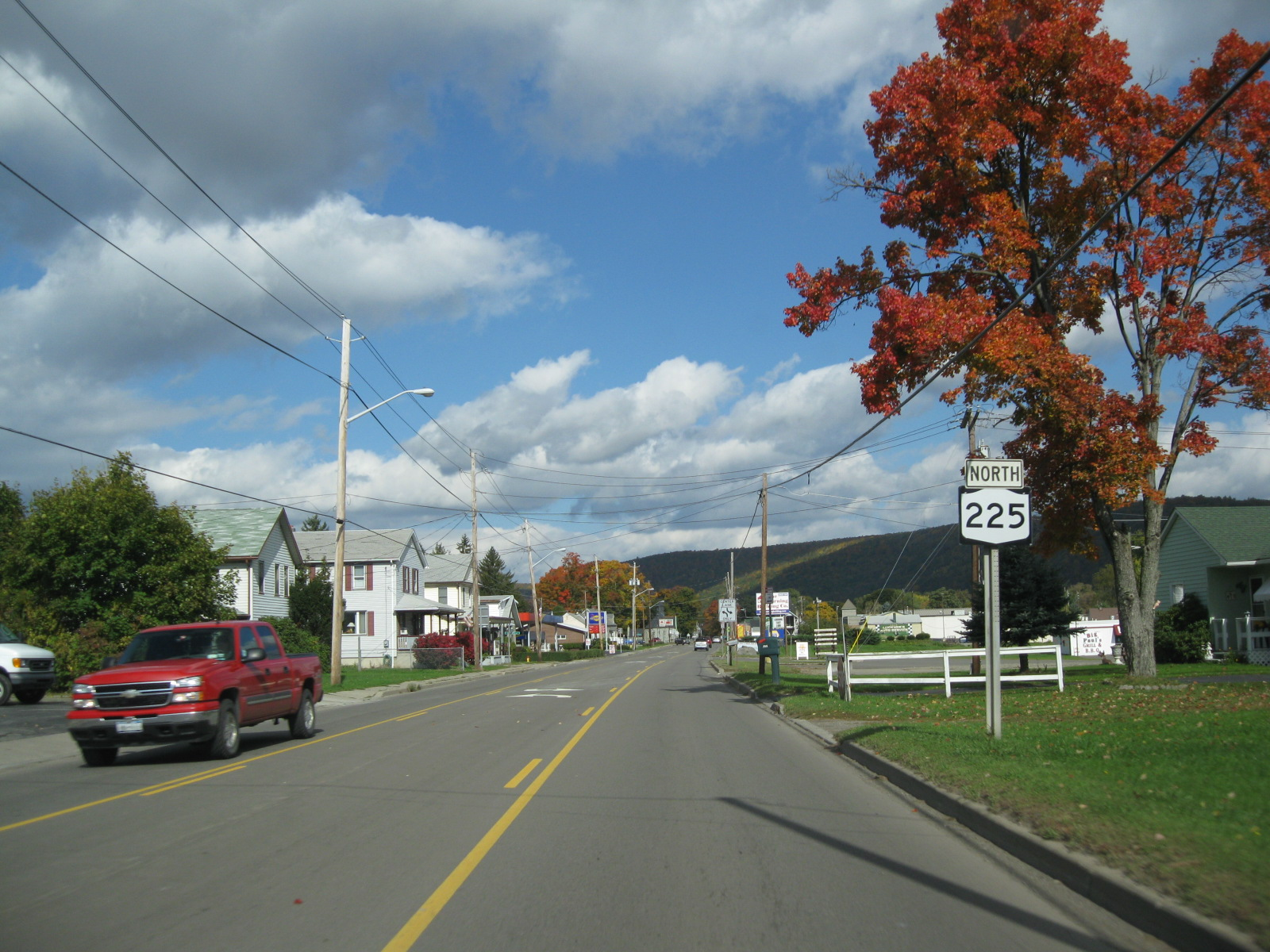
NY 225 northbound in South Corning

The roadway leading north from Caton to the Corning city line was originally improved to state highway standards under a contract awarded by the state of New York on April 5, 1910. Reconstruction of the highway cost $71,092 (equivalent to $2.4 million in 2024), and the rebuilt road was added to the state highway system on December 21, 1911, as unsigned State Highway 850 (SH 850). In the 1930 renumbering of state highways in New York, SH 850 became the southernmost portion of the new NY 44, a route continuing north through the city of Corning to the Wayne County village of Wolcott. At the same time, the road extending east from Caton to the town of Big Flats outside of Elmira became part of an extended NY 13. NY 44 was renumbered as NY 414 c. 1935 to eliminate duplication with the newly designated U.S. Route 44.

Most of NY 13 between Caton and Big Flats was county-maintained as part of CR 120 in Steuben County and as CR 7 in Chemung County. East of the Fitch Bridge, however, the road had been state-maintained since 1912 as part of SH 946. In the early 1940s, NY 13 was truncated on its southern end to downtown Elmira, leaving the Caton–Big Flats highway without a signed state route designation. The county-maintained parts of the road remained designated as CR 120 in Steuben County and CR 7 in Chemung County, while the short state-owned segment in Big Flats eventually became part of an unsigned reference route extending from Golden Glow Heights Drive to Water Street (modern NY 352).

NY 414 was truncated on January 1, 1949, to begin in downtown Corning. Its former routing from Caton to Corning was redesignated as NY 225 as part of the change. On April 1, 1980, ownership and maintenance of CR 120 east of NY 225 in Caton was transferred from Steuben County to the state of New York as part of a highway maintenance swap between the two levels of government. All of CR 7 in Chemung County was also transferred to the state sometime after 1978. The Caton–Big Flats roadway, now state-maintained along its entire length, became an eastward extension of NY 225 by 1986.

== Major intersections ==
County	Location	mi	km	Destinations	Notes
Chemung	Town of Big Flats	0.00	0.00	NY 352 (West Water Street)	Southern terminus
Steuben	Caton	9.54	15.35	CR 32 (Caton–Seeley Creek Road) / CR 120 (Tannery Creek Road)	Hamlet of Caton; CR 120 is a former routing of NY 13
Steuben	City of Corning	15.54	25.01	NY 352 (Denison Parkway)	Northern terminus
1.000 mi = 1.609 km; 1.000 km = 0.621 mi

== See also ==
- List of county routes in Chemung County, New York
