= New York State Route 34 =

State highway in central New York, US

New York State Route 34
- Map of central New York with NY 34 highlighted in red and NY 930F in blue

Route information
- Maintained by NYSDOT and the cities of Ithaca and Auburn
- Length: 99.33 mi (159.86 km)
- Existed: 1930–present

Major junctions
- South end: I-86 / NY 17 / PA 199 at the Pennsylvania state line in Waverly
- NY 96 in Spencer; NY 79 / NY 89 / NY 96 in Ithaca; NY 90 in Genoa; US 20 / NY 5 / NY 38 in Auburn; I-90 / New York Thruway near Weedsport
- North end: NY 104 in Hannibal

Location
- Country: United States
- State: New York
- Counties: Tioga, Chemung, Tompkins, Cayuga, Oswego

Highway system
- New York Highways; Interstate; US; State; Reference; Parkways
← NY 33A	→ NY 34B

New York State Route 34 (NY 34) is a north–south New York state route located in Central New York. Its southern terminus is at the Pennsylvania state line in the village of Waverly, where it connects to Pennsylvania Route 199 and meets Interstate 86 (I-86). Its northern terminus is at NY 104, outside the village of Hannibal.

== Route description ==
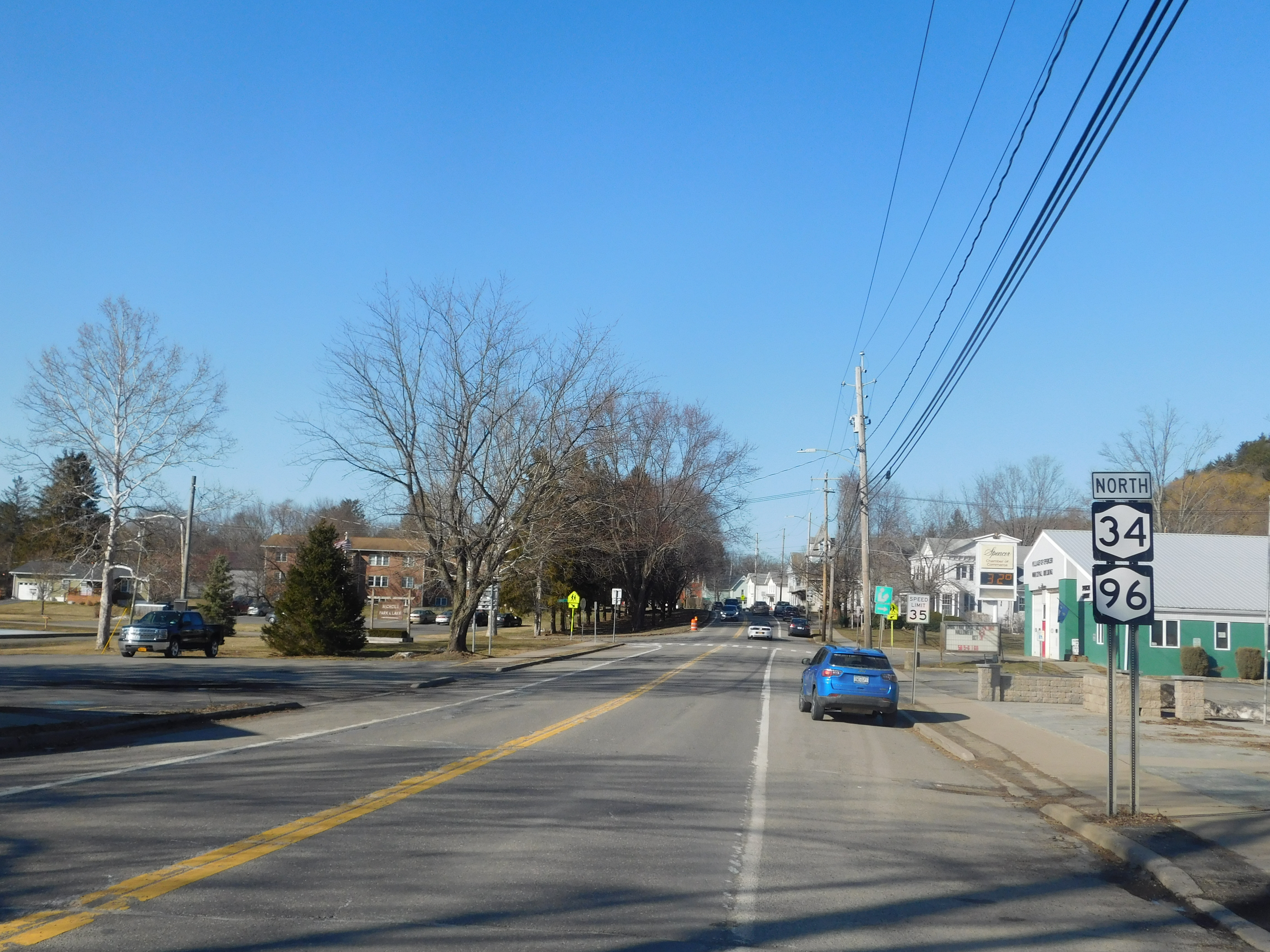
NY 34 and NY 96 northbound in Spencer

=== Tioga and Chemung counties ===
The highway begins at exit 61 of the Southern Tier Expressway, I-86/NY 17, where PA 199 crosses into New York state, and Tioga County, on Cayuta Avenue in Waverly. Little more than half a mile into the state, Cayuta Street (NY 34) comes to a T-intersection with NY 17C. NY 34 makes a sharp left and, shortly thereafter, a sharp right turn. NY 17C was formerly NY 17, and the aforementioned second sharp turn was once NY 34's southern terminus. NY 34 continues north along the east bank of Cayuta Creek across the county line to Van Etten, Chemung County.

In that village, NY 34 turns east at the eastern terminus of NY 224. Less than a mile from NY 224, NY 34 exits Chemung County and reenters Tioga County. NY 34 continues east to Spencer, where it meets up with NY 96. The routes converge from each end of Tioga Street and continue north together on Main Street. After exiting the village, NY 34 and NY 96 continue northward through the county, entering Tompkins County five miles (8 km) from Spencer.

=== Tompkins County ===
A few miles south of Ithaca, NY 34 and NY 96 merge with Elmira Road near Treman State Park, joining NY 13 northward through Buttermilk Falls State Park to Ithaca. Formerly, Meadow Street carried both directions of NY 13 and NY 34 (and NY 96) through a large part of Ithaca; however, in the late 1990s southbound traffic was diverted to Fulton Street for a ten-block section. NY 96 diverges to the west at West Buffalo Street in this section. NY 34 diverges from the NY 13 freeway in the northern part of the city. In Ithaca, NY 34 passes the Ithaca Farmers Market, the Sciencenter, and Stewart Park.

Between NY 13 and Cayuga Heights Road in the Village of Lansing, NY 34 ascends a hill, offering a view down Cayuga Lake. The highway is close to the lake shore itself for an approximately two mile stretch prior to the hill. Descending the hill, one is offered a view of the city. Easily seen is the West and East Dormitory Towers of Ithaca College, located on NY 96B.

In the town of Lansing, the highway intersects with NY 34B, a loop that serves the small communities along the ridge to the west of NY 34. NY 34 and NY 34B also form a short overlap at this point. Six miles due north of the NY 34/NY 34B intersection, NY 34 passes into Cayuga County.

=== Cayuga and Oswego counties ===
Like NY 34B to the west, NY 34 serves a handful of small communities in southern and central Cayuga county, including Genoa, at the intersection with NY 90. Five miles south of Auburn in Fleming, NY 34B rejoins NY 34, terminating at a T-intersection.

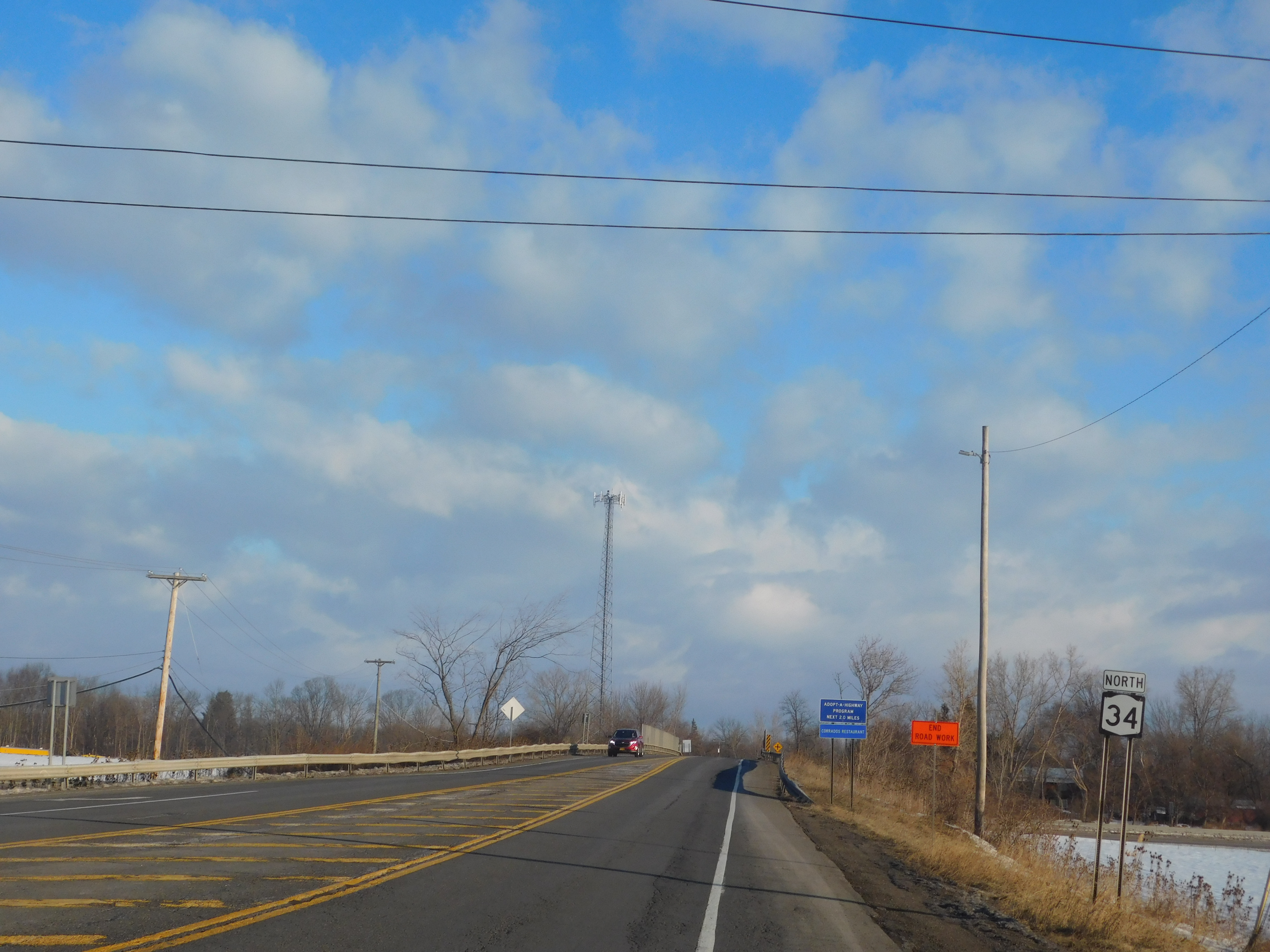
NY 34 northbound crossing the New York State Thruway in Weedsport

In downtown Auburn, NY 34 is co-signed with NY 38 from the southern edge of the city north to U.S. Route 20 (US 20) and NY 5, where NY 38 turns west. Within downtown Auburn, NY 34 passes by the Harriet Tubman Home and the William Seward House.

From Auburn, NY 34 continues north to Weedsport, where the route meets the New York State Thruway (Interstate 90 or I-90) at exit 40. Farther north, NY 34 enters Cato and meets NY 370 in the village center. Six miles to the north, NY 34 changes counties for the final time, entering Oswego County.

Of the 100 miles (161 km) of NY 34, only four miles of the route exists in Oswego County. NY 34 intersects only six roads in the county, the most notable of which is NY 104, located south of Hannibal.

== History ==
=== Origins ===
In 1908, the New York State Legislature created a statewide system of unsigned legislative routes. The portion of what is now NY 34 from Van Etten to Ithaca was included in Route 9, which originally began in Horseheads and went generally northeast across central New York to Bouckville. North of Ithaca, two sections of modern NY 34—from Cayuga Heights Road north to current NY 34B in Lansing and from the north end of NY 34B in Fleming to Auburn—became part of Route 11. On March 1, 1921, Route 9 was realigned south of Van Etten to follow modern NY 34 south to Chemung Street in Waverly. When the first set of posted routes in New York were assigned in 1924, none of modern NY 34 received a signed designation except for the current overlap between NY 34 and NY 13 south of Ithaca, which became NY 13 at this time.

By 1926, what is now NY 34 from Ithaca north to Cato was designated as part of NY 40, which continued northwest to Red Creek mostly by way of modern NY 370. South of Ithaca, current NY 34 was part of NY 53 from Van Etten to Spencer. Within Ithaca, NY 13 was routed on Spencer Road and Cayuga Street to Court Street, where NY 13 turned east and followed Court Street and University Avenue out of the city. NY 40, meanwhile, began at NY 15 (now NY 96) at the intersection of State and Aurora Streets, one block east of NY 13. NY 40 followed Aurora, Falls, and Lake Streets through the city before joining the current alignment of NY 34 at the southeastern edge of Cayuga Lake.

=== Designation and extensions ===
In the 1930 renumbering of state highways in New York, NY 40 was reassigned to another highway in the Capital District. Its former alignment became part of two new routes, namely NY 370 west of Cato and NY 34 south of Cato. Unlike NY 40 before it, NY 34 continued south to Chemung Street (then NY 17) in Waverly, utilizing the post-1921 alignment of legislative Route 9 between Ithaca and Waverly. NY 34 was extended south to the Pennsylvania state line in the early 1970s following the completion of the Southern Tier Expressway through Waverly.

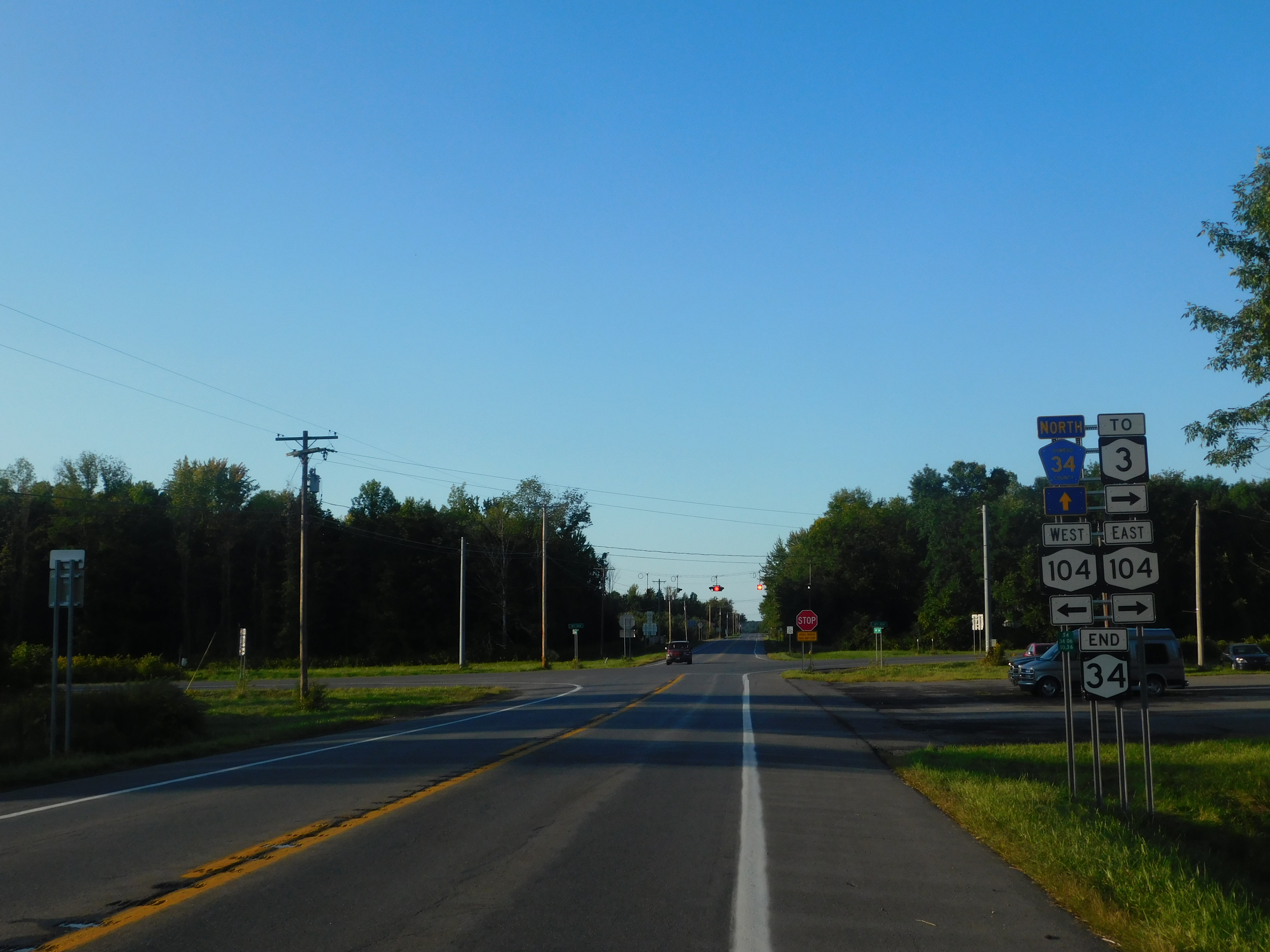
NY 34 at the end in Hannibal with NY 104; CR 34, a former alignment of NY 34, continues north

NY 34 was extended north from Cato to the super two highway carrying NY 104 around Hannibal in May 1970, taking over Cayuga County Route 40 and Oswego County Route 56. Initially, NY 34 veered east on Ira Hill East and North Roads and on Oswego County's County Route 21 (CR 21) to serve Hannibal Center; however, it was moved onto its current alignment between Cato and Hannibal by 1977. The portion of NY 34 north of Cato was county-maintained until the early 1980s when the state of New York acquired ownership of the highway as part of two highway maintenance swaps with Oswego and Cayuga counties. The section of NY 34 between the Cayuga County line and NY 104 became state-maintained on April 1, 1980, while the segment between NY 370 and the Oswego County line was turned over to the state on April 1, 1981. The county-maintained continuation of NY 34 to NY 3 in Hannibal is designated and signed as CR 34.

=== Ithaca area ===
NY 34 has been realigned through Ithaca at least three times since the 1930s. By 1948, NY 34 was shifted westward to follow Albany, Court, and Cayuga Streets through downtown. In the early 1960s, a new expressway was built along the eastern shore of Cayuga Lake, bypassing downtown Ithaca on the west and north. NY 34 was altered to follow Meadow Street and the freeway between southwestern Ithaca and its original alignment on East Shore Drive north of the city. The portion of NY 34's former alignment on East Shore Drive north of the Ithaca city line became NY 930F, an unsigned reference route. Lastly, in 1996, ten blocks of southbound NY 34 was diverted from Meadow Street to Fulton Street as part of the Octopus elimination project.

== Suffixed routes ==
New York State Route 34A
- Location: Ithaca–Lansing
- Existed: c. 1932–mid–1960s

NY 34 has had two suffixed routes; one has since been removed.

- NY 34A was an alternate route of NY 34 between the city of Ithaca and the town of Lansing. It split from NY 34 at the intersection of Court and Cayuga streets in downtown Ithaca, where NY 34 turned north to follow Cayuga Street. From here, NY 34A was routed along Court and Linn streets, University Avenue, Willard Way, and Stewart Avenue to the Ithaca city line. In Lansing, the route followed Cayuga Heights Road to the top of Esty Hill, where it rejoined its parent. The route was assigned c. 1932 and eliminated in the mid-1960s.
- NY 34B (34.03 miles or 54.77 kilometres) is an alternate route of NY 34 from NY 38 south of Groton, Tompkins County to NY 34 south of Auburn, Cayuga County. From NY 38 to NY 34 in Lansing, NY 34B is an east–west route; past Lansing, NY 34B follows a north–south routing that largely parallels NY 34. It was assigned as part of the 1930 renumbering of state highways in New York.

== Major intersections ==
County	Location	mi	km	Destinations	Notes
Tioga	Waverly	0.00	0.00	PA 199 south – Sayre	Continuation into Pennsylvania
Tioga	Waverly	0.00	0.00	I-86 / NY 17 – Binghamton, Elmira	Parclo interchange; exit 61 on I-86
Tioga	Waverly	0.72	1.16	NY 17C east	Western terminus of NY 17C
Chemung	Van Etten	14.65	23.58	NY 224 west – Watkins Glen	Eastern terminus of NY 224; hamlet of Van Etten
Tioga	Village of Spencer	17.71	28.50	NY 96 south – Owego	Southern end of NY 96 concurrency
Tompkins	Town of Ithaca	31.66	50.95	NY 13 south – Elmira	Southern end of NY 13 concurrency
Tompkins	Town of Ithaca	32.16	51.76	NY 327 north (Enfield Falls Road)	Southern terminus of NY 327
Tompkins	Town of Ithaca	33.23	53.48	NY 13A (Five Mile Drive)	
Tompkins	City of Ithaca	35.34	56.87	NY 96B south (West Clinton Street) – Ithaca College	Western terminus of NY 96B
Tompkins	City of Ithaca	35.44	57.04	NY 79 east (West Green Street) – Downtown, Cornell University	Southern end of NY 79 concurrency southbound
Tompkins	City of Ithaca	35.56	57.23	NY 79 west (West Seneca Street)	Northern end of NY 79 concurrency southbound
Tompkins	City of Ithaca	35.64	57.36	NY 89 north / NY 96 north (West Buffalo Street)	Northern end of NY 96 concurrency; southern terminus of NY 89
Tompkins	Town of Ithaca	37.25	59.95	NY 13 north / East Shore Drive (NY 930F south)	Northern end of NY 13 concurrency
Tompkins	Town of Lansing	42.92	69.07	NY 34B north – King Ferry	Southern end of NY 34B concurrency; hamlet of South Lansing
Tompkins	Town of Lansing	43.40	69.85	NY 34B south – Groton, Freeville	Northern end of NY 34B concurrency; hamlet of Terpening Corners
Cayuga	Genoa	53.63	86.31	NY 90	
Cayuga	Fleming	67.46	108.57	NY 34B south – King Ferry	Eastern terminus of NY 34B
Cayuga	Auburn	71.88	115.68	NY 38 south	Southern end of NY 38 concurrency
Cayuga	Auburn	72.80	117.16	US 20 east / NY 5 east – Syracuse	
Cayuga	Auburn	72.84	117.22	US 20 west / NY 5 west / NY 38 north – Seneca Falls, Port Byron	Northern end of NY 38 concurrency
Cayuga	Weedsport	81.55	131.24	NY 31 – Jordan, Port Byron	
Cayuga	Brutus	82.05	132.05	I-90 Toll / New York Thruway – Buffalo, Albany	Exit 40 on I-90 / Thruway
Cayuga	Village of Cato	89.72	144.39	NY 370 – Victory, Meridian	
Oswego	Town of Hannibal	99.33	159.86	NY 104 – Oswego, Rochester	Northern terminus
1.000 mi = 1.609 km; 1.000 km = 0.621 mi: Concurrency terminus; Electronic toll collection
