= Van Etten, New York =

- Town
- Location within New York Location within the United States
- Coordinates: 42°11′55″N 76°33′8″W
- Country: United States
- State: New York
- County: Chemung

Government
  - Type: Town Council
  - Town Supervisor: George Keturi (D)
  - Town Council: Members' List: • Donna Lesh; • Joseph A. St. Angelo, Jr.; • Harold E. Shoemaker; • Ralph Pietila

Area
  - Total: 41.57 sq mi (107.66 km^{2})
  - Land: 41.44 sq mi (107.34 km^{2})
  - Water: 0.12 sq mi (0.32 km^{2})
- Elevation: 1,012 ft (308 m)

Population (2020)
  - Total: 1,541 ▼
  - Estimate (2021): 1,519
  - Density: 36.1/sq mi (13.94/km^{2})
- Time zone: Eastern (EST)
- ZIP Codes: 14889 (Van Etten); 14859 (Lockwood); 14867 (Newfield)
- FIPS code: 36-015-76892
- Website: vanetten.gov

Van Etten is a town in Chemung County, New York, United States. It is part of the Elmira Metropolitan Statistical Area. The population of the town was 1,541 at the 2020 census. The town is named for the two brothers who founded the village of Van Etten in it. The town is at the northeastern corner of the county, northeast of Elmira.

== History ==
The area that became Van Etten was first settled around 1794, but more permanent settlement came in 1797. The town of Van Etten was formed in 1854 from the towns of Erin and Cayuta. (Cayuta later became part of Schuyler County.)

In 1876, the village of Van Etten was incorporated within the town.

In 2017, the village of Van Etten voted to dissolve and rejoin the town of Van Etten. The dissolution took effect on December 31, 2018.

== Geography ==
According to the United States Census Bureau, the town has a total area of 41.6 square miles (107.7 km^{2}), of which 41.4 square miles (107.3 km^{2}) is land and 0.12 square miles (0.3 km^{2}), or 0.30%, is water.

The northern town line is the border of Tompkins County, the eastern town boundary is the border of Tioga County and part of the western town line is the border of Schuyler County.

New York State Route 34 intersects New York State Route 224 at Van Etten hamlet. A short part of New York State Route 223 is at its junction with NY 224 by the west town line.

== Demographics ==
Historical population
Census	Pop.	Note	%±
1860	1,508		—
1870	1,533		1.7%
1880	1,991		29.9%
1890	1,658		−16.7%
1900	1,406		−15.2%
1910	1,184		−15.8%
1920	1,028		−13.2%
1930	1,004		−2.3%
1940	1,055		5.1%
1950	1,249		18.4%
1960	1,285		2.9%
1970	1,375		7.0%
1980	1,519		10.5%
1990	1,507		−0.8%
2000	1,518		0.7%
2010	1,557		2.6%
2020	1,541		−1.0%
2021 (est.)	1,519	▼	−1.4%
U.S. Decennial Census

As of the census of 2000, there were 1,518 people, 596 households, and 420 families residing in the town. The population density was 36.5 inhabitants per square mile (14.1/km^{2}). There were 679 housing units at an average density of 16.3 units per square mile (6.3 units/km^{2}). The racial makeup of the town was 98.55% White, 0.26% Black or African American, 0.33% Native American, 0.20% Asian, 0.20% from other races, and 0.46% from two or more races. Hispanic or Latino of any race were 0.46% of the population.

There were 596 households, out of which 35.4% had children under the age of 18 living with them, 52.3% were married couples living together, 11.7% had a female householder with no husband present, and 29.5% were non-families. 24.0% of all households were made up of individuals, and 11.1% had someone living alone who was 65 years of age or older. The average household size was 2.55 and the average family size was 2.99.

In the town, the population was spread out, with 28.2% under the age of 18, 6.3% from 18 to 24, 28.5% from 25 to 44, 25.3% from 45 to 64, and 11.7% who were 65 years of age or older. The median age was 37 years. For every 100 females, there were 98.2 males. For every 100 females age 18 and over, there were 98.5 males.

The median income for a household in the town was $32,011, and the median income for a family was $38,462. Males had a median income of $26,318 versus $24,762 for females. The per capita income for the town was $14,426. About 7.7% of families and 12.5% of the population were below the poverty line, including 16.7% of those under age 18 and 5.9% of those age 65 or over.

== Communities and locations in the town of Van Etten ==
- Swartwood – A hamlet by the western town line on NY 223. It is named after an early settler of the town, Jacob Swartwood.
- Van Etten – The hamlet of Van Etten is near the eastern town line at the junction of NY 34 and NY 224.
- Van Etten Junction – A hamlet south of Van Etten village on NY 34.
