= Verona Beach State Park =

State park in Oneida County, New York, USA

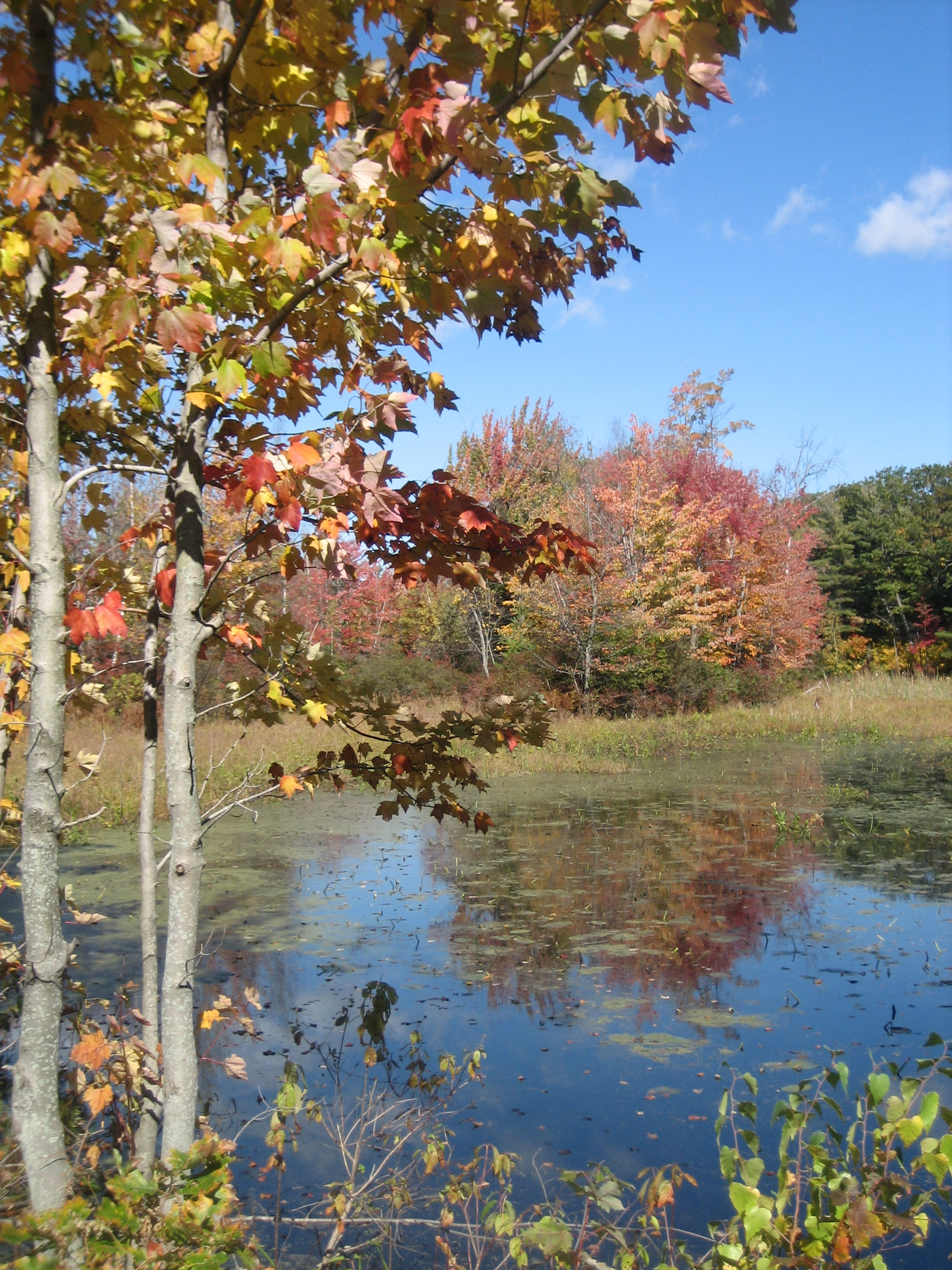
- Autumn scenery on the hiking trails of Verona Beach State Park.

- Location within New York
- Type: State park
- Location: 6541 Lakeshore Road South; Verona Beach, New York
- Nearest city: Oneida, New York
- Coordinates: 43°10′35″N 75°43′41″W
- Area: 1,735 acres (7.02 km^{2})
- Created: 1944
- Operator: New York State Office of Parks, Recreation and Historic Preservation
- Visitors: 206,438 (in 2014)
- Open: All year
- Camp sites: 46
- Website: Verona Beach State Park

Verona Beach State Park is a 1,735-acre (7.02 km^{2}) state park located on the eastern shore of Oneida Lake in the Town of Verona, Oneida County, New York. The park is located on NY 13 northwest of the City of Oneida and south of Sylvan Beach. Oneida Creek enters the Oneida Lake south of the park.

== History ==
Prior to being purchased by New York State in the 1940s, much of the area that would become the park was a privately owned tract known as Nabor's Grove. Many large trees were preserved under private ownership, contributing to the mature forest that is found on much of the park's property today.

In 1944, the New York State Council of Parks approved the initial acquisition of land for Verona Beach State Park. By 1962, 59 lots comprising 1,355 acres (5 km^{2}) had been purchased at a cost of $276,300. The final acres, purchased in 1969–70, increased the park's size to 1,735 acres (7 km^{2}) for a total cost of $288,888 or roughly $166 per acre.

The park is operated by the New York State Office of Parks, Recreation and Historic Preservation (Central Region).

== Facilities ==
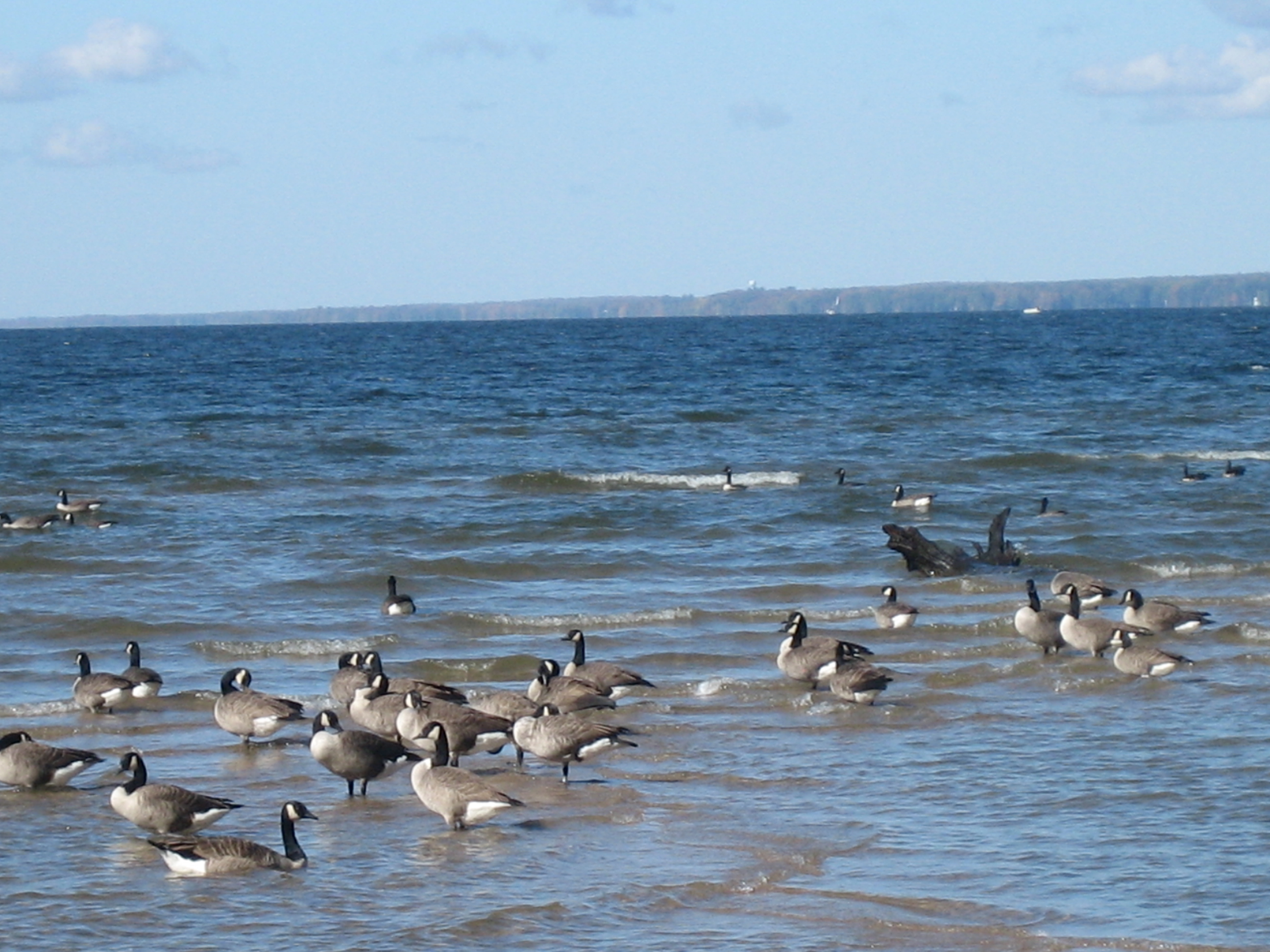
Canada geese on Oneida Lake, Verona Beach State Park

The park, set on 1,735 acres (7 km^{2}) along the eastern shore of Oneida Lake and featuring a diverse wetland habitat, offers facilities for a variety of outdoor activities.

The park offers a three-quarters-mile (1.2 km) long supervised beach, bathhouse, concession stand, an enclosed picnic pavilion and three picnic shelters, 46 campsites with a recreation building, and numerous picnic sites. There are four miles (6.4 km) of nature trails for hiking and eight miles (13 km) of horseback and mountain bike trails which become cross-country ski and snowmobile trails during the winter. Hunting for deer, small game, and waterfowl is also permitted, as is fishing and ice fishing.

In 2013, $4.3 million in improvements were announced for Verona Beach State Park, including a new bathhouse, a new food concession, an enclosed picnic pavilion, three picnic shelters to replace the park's temporary rental tents, and a reconstructed parking area.

The park has about 35 seasonal employees. It is open for daily use through Labor Day, after which the beach is closed, although the campgrounds are open through Columbus Day in October and hiking trails remain open year-round. Daily use fee is $7 per car. The beach is open from 11 a.m. to 7 p.m. daily during the summer months.

== See also ==
- List of New York state parks
