= Van Etten (CDP), New York =

Van Etten, New York
- Census-designated place
- Location within New York Location within the United States
- Coordinates: 42°11′54″N 76°33′16″W
- Country: United States
- State: New York
- County: Chemung
- Town: Van Etten

Area
  - Total: 1.28 sq mi (3.32 km^{2})
  - Land: 1.28 sq mi (3.31 km^{2})
  - Water: 0 sq mi (0.00 km^{2})
- Elevation: 1,020 ft (310 m)

Population (2020)
  - Total: 601
  - Density: 469.8/sq mi (181.39/km^{2})
- Time zone: UTC-5 (Eastern (EST))
  - Summer (DST): UTC-4 (EDT)
- ZIP Code: 14889
- Area code: 607
- FIPS code: 36-76881
- GNIS feature ID: 0968412
- Website: sites.google.com/site/villageofvanetten/

Van Etten is a hamlet and census-designated place (CDP) within the town of Van Etten in Chemung County, New York, United States. It is a former village that was absorbed by the town of Van Etten on December 31, 2018. The name came from the two brothers who founded the village. As of the 2020 census, the CDP had a population of 601.

The community is northeast of Elmira and is part of the Elmira Metropolitan Statistical Area.

== History ==
The community was founded around 1798 by James and Joshua Van Etten. Previously called "Halls Corners", at first the community was called "Van Ettenville", but was incorporated in 1876 as "Van Etten". The first railroad line arrived in 1871.

In 2017, the village of Van Etten voted to dissolve and rejoin the town of Van Etten. The hamlet was listed as a census-designated place beginning with the 2020 census.

== Geography ==
The hamlet of Van Etten is located in northeastern Chemung County at 42°11′53″N 76°33′15″W (42.19831, -76.554336) and sits near the eastern border of the town of Van Etten.

According to the United States Census Bureau, the CDP has a total area of 1.28 square miles (3.32 km^{2}), all land.

New York State Route 34 intersects New York State Route 224 in the community.

== Demographics ==
Historical population
Census	Pop.	Note	%±
1880	553		—
1890	567		2.5%
1900	474		−16.4%
1910	476		0.4%
1920	350		−26.5%
1930	370		5.7%
1940	440		18.9%
1950	504		14.5%
1960	507		0.6%
1970	522		3.0%
1980	559		7.1%
1990	552		−1.3%
2000	581		5.3%
2010	537		−7.6%
2020	601		11.9%
U.S. Decennial Census

At the 2000 census, there were 581 people, 228 households and 150 families residing in the former village. The population density was 668.6 inhabitants per square mile (258.1/km^{2}). There were 239 housing units at an average density of 275.0 per square mile (106.2/km^{2}). The racial makeup of the former village was 98.28% White, 0.17% Black or African American, 0.69% Native American, 0.17% Asian, and 0.69% from two or more races.

There were 228 households, of which 36.0% had children under the age of 18 living with them, 43.9% were married couples living together, 17.1% had a female householder with no husband present, and 33.8% were non-families. 27.2% of all households were made up of individuals, and 13.2% had someone living alone who was 65 years of age or older. The average household size was 2.55 and the average family size was 3.03.

Age distribution was 30.1% under the age of 18, 8.1% from 18 to 24, 25.6% from 25 to 44, 22.4% from 45 to 64, and 13.8% who were 65 years of age or older. The median age was 34 years. For every 100 females, there were 88.0 males. For every 100 females age 18 and over, there were 87.1 males.

The median household income was $27,955 and the median family income was $35,769. Males had a median income of $23,125 versus $30,417 for females. The per capita income for the village was $12,223. About 10.3% of families and 15.0% of the population were below the poverty line, including 14.9% of those under age 18 and 7.7% of those age 65 or over.

== Education ==
The school district is Spencer-Van Etten Central School District.
