= Spencer (village), New York =

Spencer, New York
- Village
- Location within the state of New York
- Coordinates: 42°12′45″N 76°29′47″W
- Country: United States
- State: New York
- County: Tioga
- Settled: 1794
- Incorporated: 1886
- Named after: Ambrose Spencer

Area
  - Total: 1.05 sq mi (2.72 km^{2})
  - Land: 1.03 sq mi (2.68 km^{2})
  - Water: 0.015 sq mi (0.04 km^{2})
- Elevation: 994 ft (303 m)

Population (2020)
  - Total: 719
  - Density: 694.5/sq mi (268.16/km^{2})
- Time zone: UTC-5 (Eastern (EST))
  - Summer (DST): UTC-4 (EDT)
- ZIP code: 14883
- Area code: 607
- FIPS code: 36-70167
- GNIS feature ID: 2391153
- Website: villageofspencer.com

Spencer is a village located in the Town of Spencer in Tioga County, New York, United States. The population was 759 at the 2010 census. It is part of the Binghamton Metropolitan Statistical Area. The town and village are named after Judge Ambrose Spencer.

The Village of Spencer is located in the center of the town and is south of Ithaca.

== History ==
The village is the location for the first settlement of the town, around 1794. It was called "Drake Settlement," at first, but the name was changed to "Spencer" when the town was organized and the village assumed the neighboring community of "Milltown." The village was popularly called "Pumpkin Hook" in the past.

Spencer was the county seat of Tioga County from 1812 to 1821.

The First Presbyterian Church was listed on the National Register of Historic Places in 2005.

== Geography ==
Spencer is located at 42°12′44″N 76°29′46″W (42.212423, -76.496345).

According to the United States Census Bureau, the village has a total area of 1.0 square miles (2.7 km^{2}), of which 1.0 square miles (2.7 km^{2}) is land and 0.96% is water.

The Catatonk Creek flows past the village.

New York State Route 34 and New York State Route 96 diverge in the village.

== Demographics ==
Historical population
Census	Pop.	Note	%±
1880	700		—
1890	810		15.7%
1900	707		−12.7%
1910	569		−19.5%
1920	661		16.2%
1930	628		−5.0%
1940	615		−2.1%
1950	694		12.8%
1960	767		10.5%
1970	854		11.3%
1980	863		1.1%
1990	815		−5.6%
2000	731		−10.3%
2010	759		3.8%
2020	719		−5.3%
U.S. Decennial Census

As of the census of 2000, there were 731 people, 295 households, and 199 families residing in the village. The population density was 708.0 inhabitants per square mile (273.4/km^{2}). There were 316 housing units at an average density of 306.0 per square mile (118.1/km^{2}). The racial makeup of the village was 97.81% White, 0.68% Black or African American, 0.14% Native American, 0.27% Asian, 0.14% from other races, and 0.96% from two or more races. Hispanic or Latino of any race were 0.55% of the population.

There were 295 households, out of which 33.6% had children under the age of 18 living with them, 48.8% were married couples living together, 15.6% had a female householder with no husband present, and 32.5% were non-families. 28.5% of all households were made up of individuals, and 7.8% had someone living alone who was 65 years of age or older. The average household size was 2.46 and the average family size was 2.98.

In the village, the population was spread out, with 27.4% under the age of 18, 6.8% from 18 to 24, 27.2% from 25 to 44, 26.0% from 45 to 64, and 12.6% who were 65 years of age or older. The median age was 37 years. For every 100 females, there were 88.9 males. For every 100 females age 18 and over, there were 79.4 males.

The median income for a household in the village was $32,955, and the median income for a family was $37,222. Males had a median income of $28,125 versus $21,900 for females. The per capita income for the village was $15,925. About 10.6% of families and 14.1% of the population were below the poverty line, including 19.7% of those under age 18 and 6.4% of those age 65 or over.

== Education ==
It is within the Spencer-Van Etten Central School District.
