= New York State Route 227 =

Highway in New York

New York State Route 227
- Map of the southern Finger Lakes region with NY 227 highlighted in red

Route information
- Maintained by NYSDOT
- Length: 9.84 mi (15.84 km)
- Existed: 1930–present

Major junctions
- West end: NY 79 in Hector
- North end: NY 96 in Trumansburg

Location
- Country: United States
- State: New York
- Counties: Schuyler, Tompkins

Highway system
- New York Highways; Interstate; US; State; Reference; Parkways
← NY 226	→ NY 228

New York State Route 227 (NY 227) is a state highway in the Finger Lakes region of New York in the United States. The highway extends for 9.84 miles (15.84 km) in a northeast–southwest direction from an intersection with NY 79 south of the hamlet of Reynoldsville in the town of Hector to a junction with NY 96 in the village of Trumansburg. In between, NY 227 intersects NY 228 in Perry City by the east town line of Hector and passes through the town of Ulysses. Part of NY 227 straddles the Schuyler–Tompkins county line.

When NY 227 was assigned as part of the 1930 renumbering of state highways in New York, it extended from just east of Watkins Glen to Perry City. The route was extended northward to Trumansburg in the early 1940s, replacing part of NY 79; however, it was replaced by NY 79 from Watkins Glen to Reynoldsville in the early 1960s. Prior to 1930, the sections of NY 227 near Reynoldsville and north of Perry City were part of Route 46, an unsigned legislative route.

== Route description ==
NY 227 is signed as east–west at its terminus with NY 79 and north–south at its terminus with NY 96.

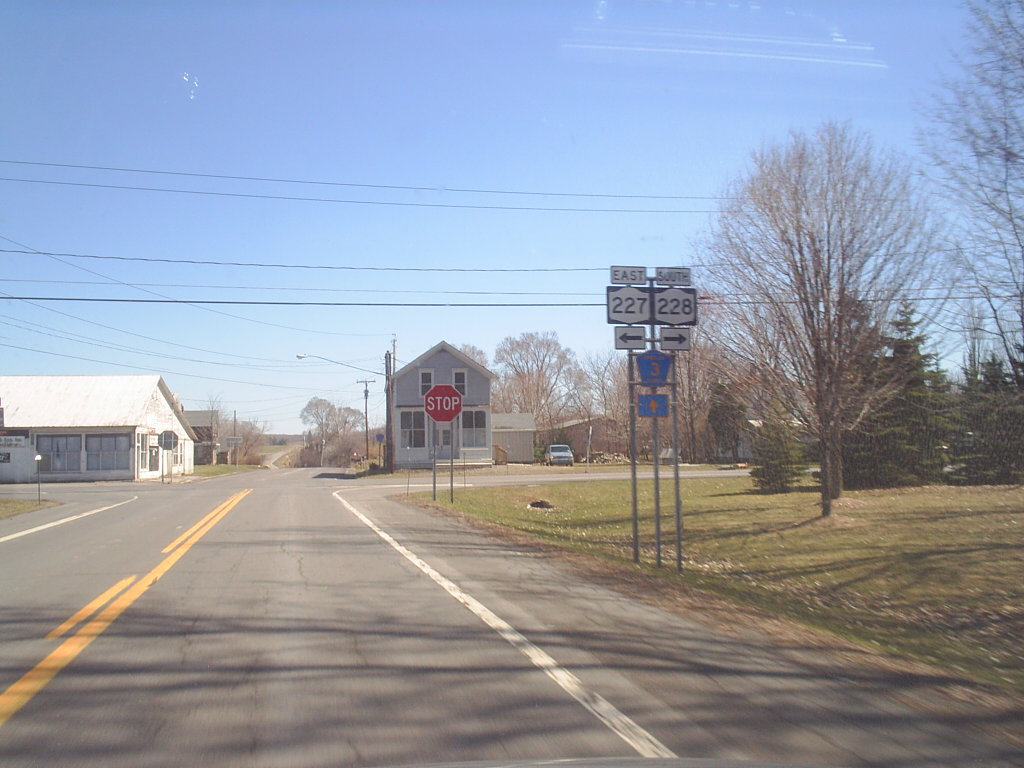
NY 227 east at Perry City, where the route intersects CR 3 and the northern terminus of NY 228

NY 227 begins at a fork off NY 79 in the town of Hector. The route bends northward, passing the eastern extremities of Finger Lakes National Forest before turning eastward into the hamlet of Reynoldsville. It serves as the main east–west road through Reynoldsville, remaining two lanes wide as it runs through the small community. After leaving the hamlet, the route keeps its gradual northeastern progression, running parallel with the nearby Updyke Road, which forks off toward NY 228. Not far from the junction, NY 227 bends eastward for a short distance near a farm, the first in a series of eastward and northeastward turns over the next 2.5 miles (4.0 km). It finally heads due east into the hamlet of Perry City, where it passes some houses ahead of the northern terminus of NY 228. At this intersection, NY 227 turns to the north on NY 228's right-of-way while NY 227's alignment continues eastward as County Route 3 (CR 3), a short 0.1-mile (0.16 km) connector to CR 142 at the nearby Tompkins County line.

Continuing north from Perry City, NY 227 straddles the Schuyler–Tompkins county line, with the northbound lane in Tompkins County. After 1 mile (1.6 km), NY 227 turns northeastward, leaving the border and completely entering Tompkins County in the town of Ulysses. Here, directional signage along the route switches from east–west to north–south. The backdrop remains rural for another mile to an intersection with Mayo Road, where the land surrounding the highway begins to become more populated. NY 227 continues its northeastern progression into the village of Trumansburg, initially passing the local golf course and intersecting with the eastern terminus of CR 149 (Searsburg Road). The area around the road becomes primarily residential, a trend that follows the route to its northern end at a junction with NY 96 (West Main Street) in downtown Trumansburg.

== History ==
In 1911, the New York State Legislature created Route 46, an unsigned legislative route extending from Coopers Plains in Chemung County to Trumansburg in Tompkins County via Watkins Glen. East of Watkins Glen, Route 46 proceeded generally northeastward through Burdett, Reynoldsville and Mecklenburg on its way to Trumansburg. On March 1, 1921, the Route 46 designation was reassigned to another highway in Allegany and Steuben counties as part of a partial renumbering of the legislative route system. The 2-mile (3.2 km) segment of pre-1921 Route 46 that ran alongside Seneca Lake became part of NY 78 c. 1927; however, the remainder of old Route 46 between Watkins Glen and Trumansburg went unnumbered until 1930.

NY 78 was replaced by NY 44 (now NY 414) in the vicinity of Watkins Glen as part of the 1930 renumbering of state highways in New York. At the same time, two parts of the pre-1921 routing of Route 46 east of Seneca Lake were assigned posted route numbers for the first time. From just northeast of Watkins Glen to Reynoldsville, the old road became part of NY 227, which initially extended from NY 44 (now NY 414) near Watkins Glen to NY 79 in Perry City. While Route 46 veered southeast from Reynoldsville to serve Mecklenburg, NY 227 proceeded northeast from the former to connect to Perry City. The portion of old Route 46 north of Perry City became part of NY 79.

NY 227 was extended north to Trumansburg in the early 1940s, replacing NY 79, which was truncated south to its junction with NY 227 in Perry City. NY 79 was rerouted west of Mecklenburg in the early 1960s to end at NY 414 near Watkins Glen. The realignment supplanted NY 227 from Watkins Glen to Reynoldsville and utilized the old Route 46 corridor from there to Mecklenburg. NY 227 was truncated to its junction with NY 79 south of Reynoldsville at this time.

== Major intersections ==
County	Location	mi	km	Destinations	Notes
Schuyler	Hector	0.00	0.00	NY 79 – Watkins Glen, Ithaca	Western terminus
Schuyler	Hector	5.92	9.53	NY 228 south – Odessa, Ithaca	Hamlet of Perry City; northern terminus of NY 228
Tompkins	Trumansburg	9.84	15.84	NY 96 (West Main Street) – Waterloo, Geneva, Ithaca	Northern terminus
1.000 mi = 1.609 km; 1.000 km = 0.621 mi
