= List of county routes in Schuyler County, New York =

County routes in Schuyler County, New York, are signed with the Manual on Uniform Traffic Control Devices-standard yellow-on-blue pentagon route marker. Route numbers are generally assigned in a clockwise fashion, beginning in the northeastern corner of the county.

== Route list ==
Route	Length (mi)	Length (km)	From	Via	To	Notes
CR 1	9.45	15.21	NY 414	Searsburg Road in Hector	Tompkins County line (becomes CR 149)	
CR 2	2.25	3.62	NY 414	Ferguson Corners Road in Hector	CR 4	Serves Finger Lakes National Forest
CR 3	0.10	0.16	NY 227 / NY 228	Perry City Road in Hector	Tompkins County line (becomes CR 142)	
CR 4	7.45	11.99	NY 79	Logan Road in Hector	CR 1	
CR 5	0.89	1.43	Burdett village line	Main Street in Hector	NY 414	
CR 6	9.72	15.64	CR 10 in Catharine	Cayutaville and McIntyre roads	NY 228 in Hector	
CR 7	5.69	9.16	Odessa village line in Catharine	Lower Foots Hill Road	CR 8 in Hector	
CR 8	4.71	7.58	Montour Falls village line in Montour	Skyline Drive	NY 79 in Hector	
CR 9	1.18	1.90	CR 8	Dean Road in Hector	NY 79	
CR 10	2.02	3.25	NY 224	North Settlement Road in Catharine	NY 228	
CR 11	2.14	3.44	CR 14	Catharine Alpine Road in Catharine	NY 224	Includes north–south spur to NY 224
CR 12	0.42	0.68	NY 224	Cayuta Road in Cayuta	Tompkins County line (becomes CR 135)	
CR 13	2.83	4.55	NY 224	Jackson Hollow Road in Cayuta	Tompkins County line (becomes CR 132)	Northern part overlaps with CR 54 along Chemung County line
CR 14	6.91	11.12	Montour Falls village line in Montour	Jackson Hill and Hinman roads	NY 13 in Cayuta	
CR 15	2.46	3.96	Chemung County line (becomes CR 5)	Ridge Road in Catharine	Odessa village line	
CR 16	15.08	24.27	Steuben County line in Orange (becomes CR 26)	Meads Creek Road	Montour Falls village line in Dix	
CR 17	1.86	2.99	NY 414	Old Corning Road in Dix	NY 329	Former routing of NY 414
CR 18	2.08	3.35	Chemung County line (becomes CR 12)	Johnson Hollow Road in Dix	NY 414	
CR 19	4.36	7.02	Chemung County line	Beaver Dams Road in Dix	CR 16	
CR 20	0.27	0.43	CR 19	Hornby Road in Dix	NY 414	
CR 21	4.63	7.45	CR 16 in Orange	Sugar Hill Road	CR 23 in Tyrone	
CR 22	6.88	11.07	CR 16 in Orange	Howell Road	NY 226 in Tyrone	
CR 23	11.15	17.94	Steuben County line in Tyrone (becomes CR 114)	Hammondsport and Mud Lake roads	CR 28 in Reading	
CR 23A	0.50	0.80	NY 226	Church Hill Road in Tyrone	CR 23	
CR 24	0.70	1.13	CR 23	West Lake Road in Tyrone	Steuben County line (becomes CR 97)	
CR 25	3.57	5.75	CR 23	Lent Road in Tyrone	NY 230	
CR 26	1.10	1.77	NY 230	Old Bath Road in Tyrone	Yates County line (becomes CR 17)	
CR 27	4.06	6.53	CR 23	Love Road in Reading	NY 226	
CR 28	3.94	6.34	NY 409 in Watkins Glen	Lovers Lane and Irelandville Road	NY 14A in Reading	
CR 29	1.81	2.91	NY 14A	Reading Road in Reading	Yates County line	
CR 30	1.01	1.63	Watkins Glen village line	Salt Point Road in Reading	AkzoNobel plant	
CR 31	0.20	0.32	Montour Falls village line	Belle P. Cornell Drive in Dix	NY 414	

== See also ==
- County routes in New York
