= List of county routes in Tompkins County, New York =

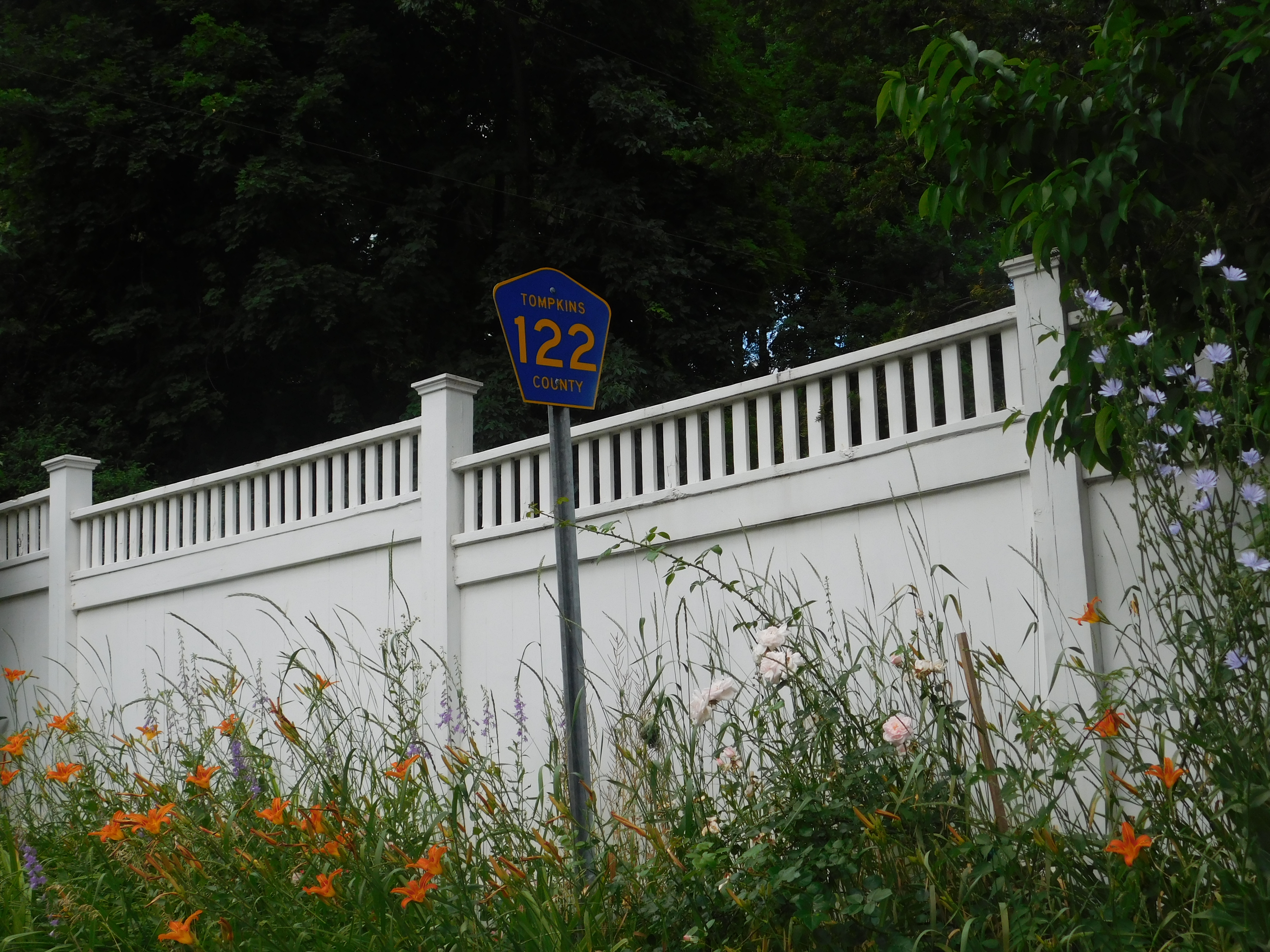
- CR 122 signage in Forest Home

Highway names
- Interstates: Interstate X (I-X)
- US Highways: U.S. Route X (US X)
- State: New York State Route X (NY X)
- County: County Route X (CR X)

System links
- New York Highways; Interstate; US; State; Reference; Parkways

County routes in Tompkins County, New York, are signed with the Manual on Uniform Traffic Control Devices-standard yellow-on-blue pentagon route marker.

== Routes 100–150 ==
Number	Length (mi)	Length (km)	Southern or western terminus	Northern or eastern terminus	Local names	Formed	Removed	Notes
CR 100	6.43	10.35	NY 34 in Lansing	Spring Street Extension (CR 190) in Groton	North Lansing School Road; West Groton Road	—	—	
CR 101	4.04	6.50	Pleasant Valley Road (CR 153) in Groton	Cayuga County line in Groton (becomes CR 50)	Cobb Street	—	—	
CR 101	0.20	0.32	NY 34B in Dryden	Groton town line in Dryden	Cobb Road	—	—	
CR 102	4.03	6.49	Stevens Road (CR 104) at Stevens Road in Groton	Cayuga County line in Groton (becomes CR 102)	Salt Road	—	—	
CR 103	1.69	2.72	NY 222 in Groton	Champlin Road (CR 103A) in Groton	Groton City Road	—	—	
CR 103A	2.05	3.30	NY 222 in Groton	Cayuga County line in Groton (becomes CR 101)	Champlin Road	—	—	
CR 103B	0.73	1.17	Groton City Road (CR 103) in Groton	Cayuga County line in Groton (becomes CR 163)	Hinman Road	—	—	
CR 104	2.20	3.54	Salt Road (CR 102) in Groton	School Street (CR 105) in Groton	Stevens Road	—	—	
CR 105	5.25	8.45	Freeville village line in Dryden	Cortland County line in Groton (becomes CR 120)	Fall Creek Road; School Street; and McLean–Cortland Road	—	—	
CR 106	2.00	3.22	NY 13 in Dryden	School Street (CR 105) in Groton	Gulf Hill Road	—	—	
CR 107	3.50	5.63	NY 34B / NY 38 in Groton	Fall Creek Road (CR 105) in Groton	Peruville Road	—	—	
CR 107A	1.84	2.96	NY 34B in Groton	Peruville Road (CR 107) in Groton	Old Peruville Road	—	—	
CR 108	7.79	12.54	NY 34 in Lansing	NY 38 in Dryden	Asbury Road; West Dryden Road	—	—	
CR 108	1.61	2.59	Warren Road (CR 121) in Lansing	Asbury Road in Dryden	Farrell Road; West Dryden Road	—	—	
CR 109	6.62	10.65	Cayuga Heights village line in Ithaca	NY 13 in Dryden	Hanshaw Road; Etna Road; Upper Creek Road; Etna Lane	—	—	
CR 110	4.93	7.93	Ithaca city line in Ithaca	Ellis Hollow Creek Road (CR 164) in Dryden	Mitchell Street Extension; Ellis Hollow Road	—	—	Part west of CR 173 was formerly part of NY 393
CR 113	3.20	5.15	Coddington Road (CR 119) in Caroline	NY 79 in Caroline	Caroline Depot Road; White Church Road, Lounsberry Road	—	—	
CR 113A	0.45	0.72	Valley Road (CR 115) in Caroline	Lounsberry Road (CR 113) in Caroline	Old Brooktondale Road	—	—	
CR 114	0.58	0.93	Valley Road (CR 115) in Caroline	NY 79 in Caroline	Boiceville Road	—	—	
CR 115	12.91	20.78	Tioga County line in Caroline (becomes CR 33)	NY 79 in Dryden	Old 76 Road; Central Chapel Road; Valley Road; Brooktondale Road	—	—	Part north of 76 Road was formerly NY 330
CR 115M	0.27	0.43	Old 76 Road (CR 115) in Caroline	Tioga County line in Caroline (becomes CR 33)	Mill Road	—	—	
CR 116	1.11	1.79	Coddington Road (CR 119) in Ithaca	NY 79 in Ithaca	Burns Road	—	—	
CR 117	4.38	7.05	NY 79 in Caroline	Cortland County line in Dryden (becomes CR 137)	Harford Road	—	—	Briefly enters Tioga County as CR 29
CR 117A	1.00	1.61	NY 79 in Caroline	Harford Road (CR 117) in Caroline	Flat Iron Road	—	—	
CR 119	10.68	17.19	Tioga County line in Caroline (becomes CR 15)	NY 96B in Ithaca	Coddington Road	—	—	
CR 121	1.90	3.06	Forest Home Drive in Ithaca	Lansing village line in Ithaca	Warren Road	—	—	
CR 121	2.97	4.78	NY 13 in Lansing village	Asbury Road (CR 108) in Lansing	Warren Road	—	—	
CR 122	0.60	0.97	Forest Home Drive in Ithaca	Cayuga Heights village line in Ithaca	Pleasant Grove Road	—	—	
CR 122	2.58	4.15	Lansing village line in Lansing	NY 34 in Lansing	North Triphammer Road	—	—	
CR 123	5.87	9.45	NY 96B in Danby	CR 119 in Ithaca	Hornbrook Road; Nelson Road; Troy Road	—	—	
CR 124	0.86	1.38	Warren Road (CR 121) in Lansing village	NY 13 in Lansing village	Brown Road	—	—	
CR 125	4.82	7.76	Tioga County line in Danby (becomes CR 5)	NY 96B in Danby	South Danby Road	—	—	
CR 126	2.12	3.41	Comfort Road in Danby	NY 96B in Danby	Bald Hill Road	—	—	
CR 127	1.00	1.61	Comfort Road (CR 128) in Danby	NY 96B in Danby	West Miller Road	—	—	
CR 128	6.06	9.75	Comfort Road / Jersey Hill Road in Danby	NY 96B in Danby	Jersey Hill Road; Gunderman Road; Comfort Road (Note: The southern portion is a loop comprising Jersey Hill, Gunderman, and Comfort roads. The route follows Comfort Road north of Jersey Hill Road to reach NY 96B.)	—	—	
CR 129	2.00	3.22	Vankirk Road (CR 132) in Newfield	Shaffer Road (CR 131) in Newfield	Van Buskirk Gulf Road	—	—	
CR 130	1.92	3.09	Main Street in Newfield	NY 34 / NY 96 in Newfield	Newfield Depot Road	—	—	
CR 131	6.62	10.65	Chemung County line in Newfield (becomes CR 13)	Main Street in Newfield	Shaffer Road	—	—	
CR 131A	0.93	1.50	Shaffer Road (CR 131) in Newfield	Newfield Depot Road (CR 130) in Newfield	Adams Road	—	—	
CR 132	5.66	9.11	Schuyler and Tioga county lines in Newfield (Note: Road continues south along the Schuyler–Tioga county line, co-designated as CR 54 by Chemung County and CR 13 by Schuyler County.)	Main Street in Newfield	Van Kirk Road	—	—	
CR 133	6.07	9.77	Main Street in Newfield	NY 327 in Enfield	Trumbulls Corners Road	—	—	
CR 133A	1.56	2.51	NY 13 in Newfield	Test Road in Newfield	Sebring Road	—	—	
CR 134	3.79	6.10	Trumbulls Corners Road (CR 133) in Newfield	NY 13 in Newfield	Millard Hill Road	—	—	
CR 135	0.82	1.32	Schuyler County line in Newfield (becomes CR 12)	NY 13 in Newfield	Cayuta Road	—	—	
CR 136	10.94	17.61	Trumbulls Corners Road (CR 133) in Enfield	Trumansburg village line in Ulysses	Connecticut Hill Road; Black Oak Road; Waterburg Road; South Street Extension	—	—	
CR 137	4.20	6.76	South Applegate Road (CR 143) in Enfield	NY 13A in Ithaca	Bostwick Road	—	—	
CR 139	4.60	7.40	Halseyville Road (CR 170) in Enfield	NY 96 in Ithaca	Hayts Road	—	—	
CR 140	3.76	6.05	NY 96 in Ithaca	Kraft Road (CR 145) in Ulysses	Duboise Road	—	—	
CR 141	2.55	4.10	Iradell Road (CR 177) / Sheffield Road (CR 172) in Ulysses	Dubois Road (CR 140) in Ulysses	Krums Corners Road	—	—	
CR 142	7.75	12.47	Schuyler County line in Ulysses (becomes CR 3)	NY 89 in Ulysses	Perry City Road	—	—	
CR 143	7.76	12.49	Bostwick Road (CR 137) in Enfield	Taughannock Park Road (CR 143A) in Ulysses	South Applegate Road; North Applegate Road; Jacksonville Road	—	—	
CR 143A	1.14	1.83	NY 96 in Ulysses	Falls Road in Ulysses	Taughannock Park Road	—	—	
CR 144	0.68	1.09	Willow Creek Road / Agard Road in Ulysses	Kraft Road (CR 145) in Ulysses	Willow Creek Road	—	—	
CR 145	2.58	4.15	Jacksonville Road (CR 143) in Ulysses	NY 89 in Ulysses	Kraft Road	—	—	
CR 146	5.22	8.40	NY 79 in Enfield	Waterburg Road (CR 136) in Ulysses	Podunk Road	—	—	
CR 147	1.99	3.20	Podunk Road (CR 146) in Ulysses	NY 96 in Ulysses	Swamp College Road	—	—	
CR 149	1.21	1.95	Schuyler County line in Ulysses (becomes CR 1)	Trumansburg village line in Ulysses	Searsburg Road	—	—	
CR 150	1.51	2.43	Cement plant gate in Lansing	NY 34B in Lansing	Portland Point Road	—	—	

== Routes 151 and up ==
Number	Length (mi)	Length (km)	Southern or western terminus	Northern or eastern terminus	Local names	Formed	Removed	Notes
CR 151	4.42	7.11	NY 34B in Lansing	North Lansing School Road (CR 100) in Lansing	Vanostrand Road	—	—	
CR 153	3.09	4.97	Lansing town line in Groton	Smith Road (CR 178) in Groton	Pleasant Valley Road	—	—	
CR 154	2.50	4.02	NY 34 in Lansing	Cayuga County line in Lansing (becomes CR 48)	Locke Road	—	—	
CR 155	4.71	7.58	NY 34B in Lansing	Cayuga County line in Lansing (becomes CR 32)	Lansingville Road	—	—	
CR 156	0.49	0.79	Milliken Station Road in Lansing	NY 34B in Lansing	Cayuga Drive	—	—	
CR 159	1.52	2.45	NY 34B in Lansing	NY 34B in Lansing	Brickyard Road; Ludlowville Road	—	—	
CR 161	2.06	3.32	Ellis Hollow Road (CR 110) in Dryden	NY 366 in Dryden	Turkey Hill Road	—	—	
CR 162	4.82	7.76	NY 79 in Caroline	Ringwood Road (CR 164) in Dryden	Midline Road	—	—	
CR 162A	5.23	8.42	Midline Road (CR 162) in Dryden	NY 13 in Dryden	Irish Settlement Road	—	—	
CR 163	2.48	3.99	NY 13 in Dryden	Fall Creek Road (CR 105) in Dryden	North Road	—	—	
CR 164	7.47	12.02	NY 79 in Caroline	NY 13 in Dryden	Ellis Hollow Road; Ellis Hollow Creek Road; Ringwood Road	—	—	
CR 166	2.05	3.30	West Dryden Road (CR 108) in Dryden	NY 34B in Dryden	Caswell Road	—	—	
CR 169	2.50	4.02	Peruville Road (CR 107) in Groton	Groton village line in Groton	Lick Street; South Main Street Extension	—	—	
CR 170	5.31	8.55	NY 79 in Enfield	NY 96 in Ulysses	Halseyville Road	—	—	
CR 171	1.45	2.33	NY 38 in Groton	Cayuga County line in Groton (becomes CR 161)	Chipman Corners	—	—	
CR 172	3.92	6.31	Bostwick Road (CR 137) in Ithaca	Iradell Road (CR 177) / Krums Corners Road (CR 141) in Ithaca	Sheffield Road	—	—	
CR 173	1.23	1.98	Ellis Hollow Road (CR 110) in Ithaca	NY 366 in Ithaca	Game Farm Road	—	—	
CR 174	1.60	2.57	NY 79 in Ithaca	NY 366 in Ithaca	Pine Tree Road	—	—	
CR 175	0.59	0.95	Brooktondale Road (CR 115) in Caroline	NY 79 in Caroline	Besemer Road	—	—	
CR 177	5.80	9.33	Waterburg Road (CR 136) in Enfield	NY 96 in Ithaca	Iradell Road	—	—	
CR 177A	0.22	0.35	Iradell Road (CR 177) in Ulysses	Krums Corners Road (CR 141) in Ulysses	Iradell Road Extension	—	—	
CR 178	4.35	7.00	Old Peruville Road (CR 107A) in Groton	West Groton Road (CR 100) in Groton	Pleasant Valley Road; Smith Road	—	—	
CR 179	2.05	3.30	NY 96B in Ithaca	Coddington Road (CR 119) in Ithaca	East King Road	—	—	
CR 180	2.98	4.80	School Street (CR 105) in Groton	NY 222 in Groton	Church Street; Lafayette Road	—	—	
CR 181	1.69	2.72	CR 154 in Lansing	CR 101 in Groton	West Groton Road; Talmadge Road	—	—	
CR 182	5.09	8.19	Etna Road (CR 109) in Dryden	NY 34B in Dryden	Hanshaw Road; Neimi Road; Sheldon Road	—	—	
CR 182H	1.03	1.66	Neimi Road (CR 182) in Dryden	West Dryden Road (CR 108) in Dryden	Hanshaw Road	—	—	
CR 183	0.99	1.59	Schuyler County line in Enfield	Black Oak Road (CR 136) in Enfield	Weatherby Road	—	—	
CR 184	2.23	3.59	NY 34B in Lansing	Lansingville Road (CR 155) in Lansing	Jerry Smith Road	—	—	
CR 185	1.60	2.57	NY 34B in Lansing	Cayuga County line in Lansing (becomes CR 157)	Lake Ridge Road	—	—	
CR 186	4.42	7.11	NY 34B in Lansing	NY 34 in Lansing	Conlon Road	—	—	
CR 187	2.10	3.38	NY 34 / NY 96 in Danby	Tioga County line in Danby (becomes CR 1)	Hillview Road; Michigan Hollow Road	—	—	
CR 187	0.06	0.097	NY 34 / NY 96 in Danby	Hillview Road (CR 187) in Danby	Hillview Road Spur	—	—	
CR 188	0.43	0.69	NY 34 / NY 96 in Danby	Norfolk Southern Railway crossing in Danby	Station Road	—	—	
CR 189	2.96	4.76	NY 34B in Lansing	Lansingville Road (CR 155) in Lansing	Fenner Road	—	—	
CR 190	3.41	5.49	West Groton Road (CR 101) in Groton	Groton village line in Groton	Spring Street Extension	—	—	

== See also ==
- County routes in New York
