= New York State Route 327 =

State highway in Tompkins County, New York, US

New York State Route 327
- Map of Ithaca and vicinity with NY 327 highlighted in red

Route information
- Maintained by NYSDOT
- Length: 7.11 mi (11.44 km)
- Existed: 1930–present

Major junctions
- South end: NY 13 / NY 34 / NY 96 in Ithaca
- North end: NY 79 in Enfield

Location
- Country: United States
- State: New York
- Counties: Tompkins

Highway system
- New York Highways; Interstate; US; State; Reference; Parkways
← NY 326	→ NY 328

New York State Route 327 (NY 327) is a state highway located within Tompkins County, New York, in the United States. It extends for 7.11 miles (11.44 km) in a northwest–southeast direction from an intersection with the concurrent routes of NY 13, NY 34, and NY 96 in the town of Ithaca to a junction with NY 79 in the town of Enfield. NY 327 runs along the northern edge of Robert H. Treman State Park as it passes from Ithaca to Enfield. The route was assigned as part of the 1930 renumbering of state highways in New York.

== Route description ==
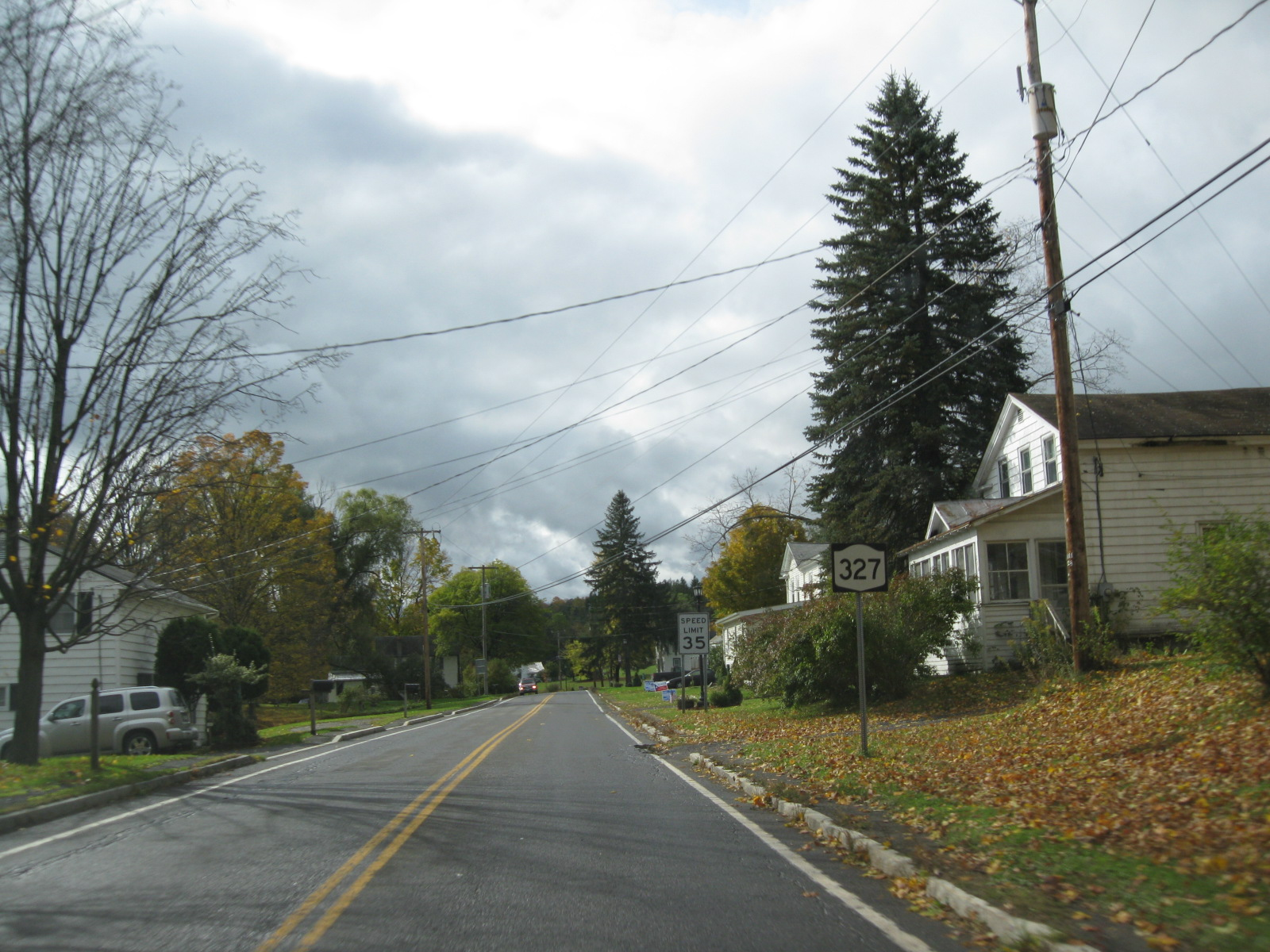
NY 327 through the hamlet of Enfield

NY 327 begins at an intersection with NY 13, NY 34 and NY 96 (Elmira Road) in the town of Ithaca. Although the route is signed as a north–south highway, it initially heads southwest along the two-lane Enfield Falls Road toward Robert H. Treman State Park. The highway connects to the park's northeast entrance before bending northwest and rising in elevation as it heads through a wooded area north of the park. NY 327 soon crosses into the town of Enfield, where it continues to wind its way westward along the edge of Treman State Park. The route connects to the park's northwest entrance before heading away from the park on a northwestward alignment. NY 327 maintains the northwesterly track for about 1.5 miles (2.4 km) to a junction with County Route 133 (CR 133, named Trumbulls Corners Road), where the highway finally makes a bend to the north.

Past CR 133, the route's rural surroundings give way to residential portions of Enfield, including the hamlet of Bostwick Corners. Here, the highway becomes known as Enfield Main Road, and the new name follows NY 327 along a sparsely populated stretch to the hamlet of Enfield 1 mile (1.6 km) to the north. North of Enfield, NY 327 runs past a line of homes that follows the highway to a junction with NY 79 (Mecklenburg Road). NY 327 ends here while the road's right-of-way continues north to NY 96 in Ulysses as CR 170 (Halseyville Road).

== History ==
The portion of NY 327 north of the hamlet of Enfield was originally improved to state highway standards as part of a contract awarded by the state of New York on April 27, 1912. It was added to the state highway system on August 10, 1915, as part of unsigned State Highway 1001 (SH 1001). The remainder of modern NY 327 was rebuilt under a project let by the state on October 19, 1914, and accepted into the state highway system on October 19, 1918, as SH 1189. In the 1930 renumbering of state highways in New York, hundreds of state-maintained highways were assigned posted route numbers for the first time. SH 1189 and the piece of SH 1001 between Enfield and NY 79 became NY 327, and the route's alignment has not been substantially altered since.

== Major intersections ==
The entire route is in Tompkins County.

Location	mi	km	Destinations	Notes
Town of Ithaca	0.00	0.00	NY 13 / NY 34 / NY 96 (Elmira Road)	Southern terminus
Enfield	7.11	11.44	NY 79 (Mecklenburg Road)	Northern terminus; hamlet of Millers Corners
1.000 mi = 1.609 km; 1.000 km = 0.621 mi
