= Logan Methodist Church =

Historic church in New York, United States

- U.S. National Register of Historic Places
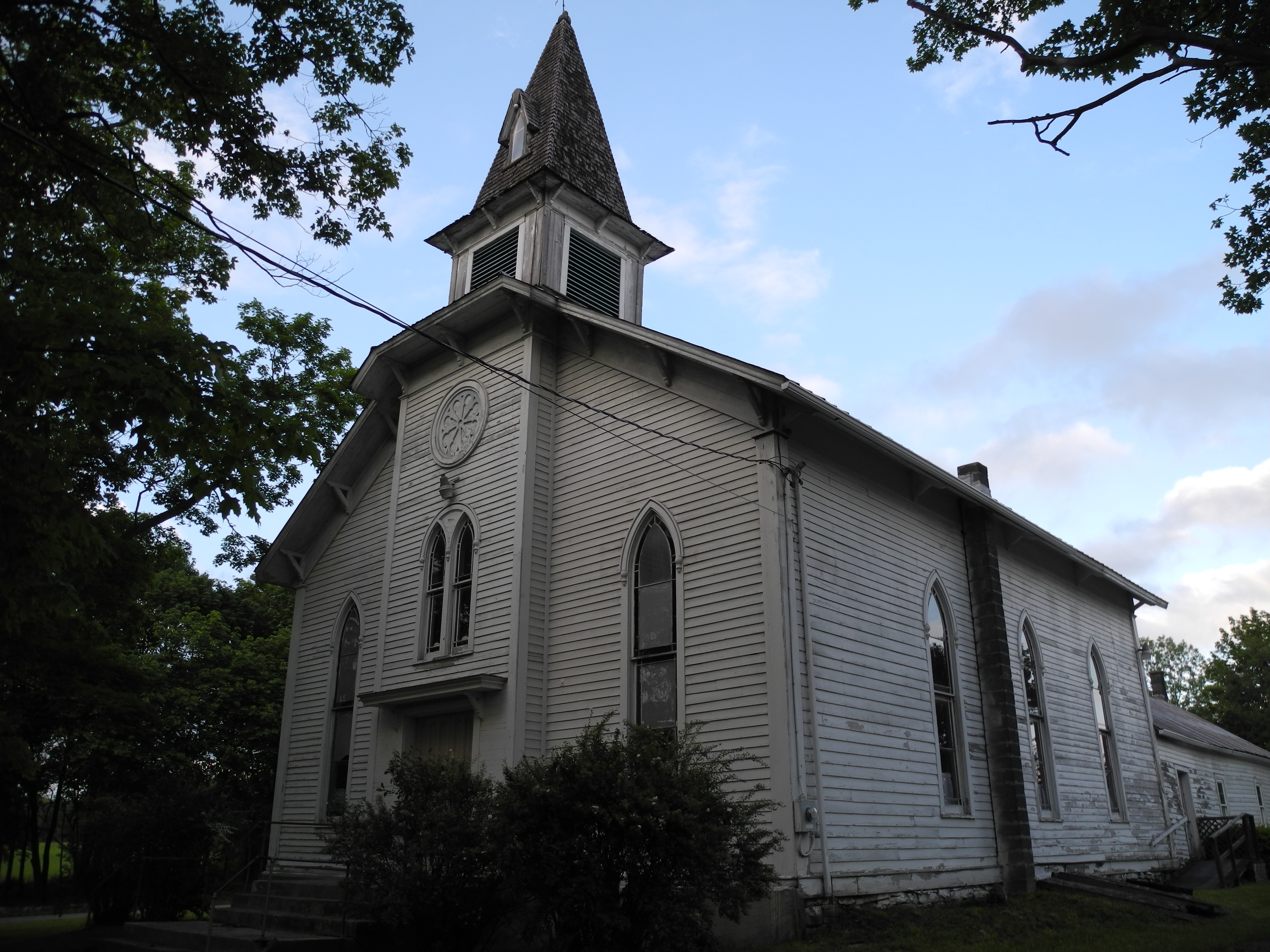

- Location within New York Location within the United States
- Location: Jct. of Cty. Rts. 4 and 2, Logan, New York
- Coordinates: 42°29′15″N 76°49′43″W
- Area: 1 acre (0.40 ha)
- Built: 1833
- Architectural style: Federal
- NRHP reference No.: 00001690
- Added to NRHP: January 26, 2001

Logan Methodist Church is a historic Methodist church located at Logan in Schuyler County, New York. It was built in 1833 and remodeled in 1878 and is a large Federal era frame building with a veneer of Victorian era embellishment. It is a rectangular frame structure resting on a slightly raised stone foundation. It features a handsome central tower with a louvered belfry. It ceased being used for church activities in 1970 and refurbished as the Logan Community Center.

It was listed on the National Register of Historic Places in 2001.
