= First Presbyterian Church of Hector =

Historic church in New York, United States

- U.S. National Register of Historic Places
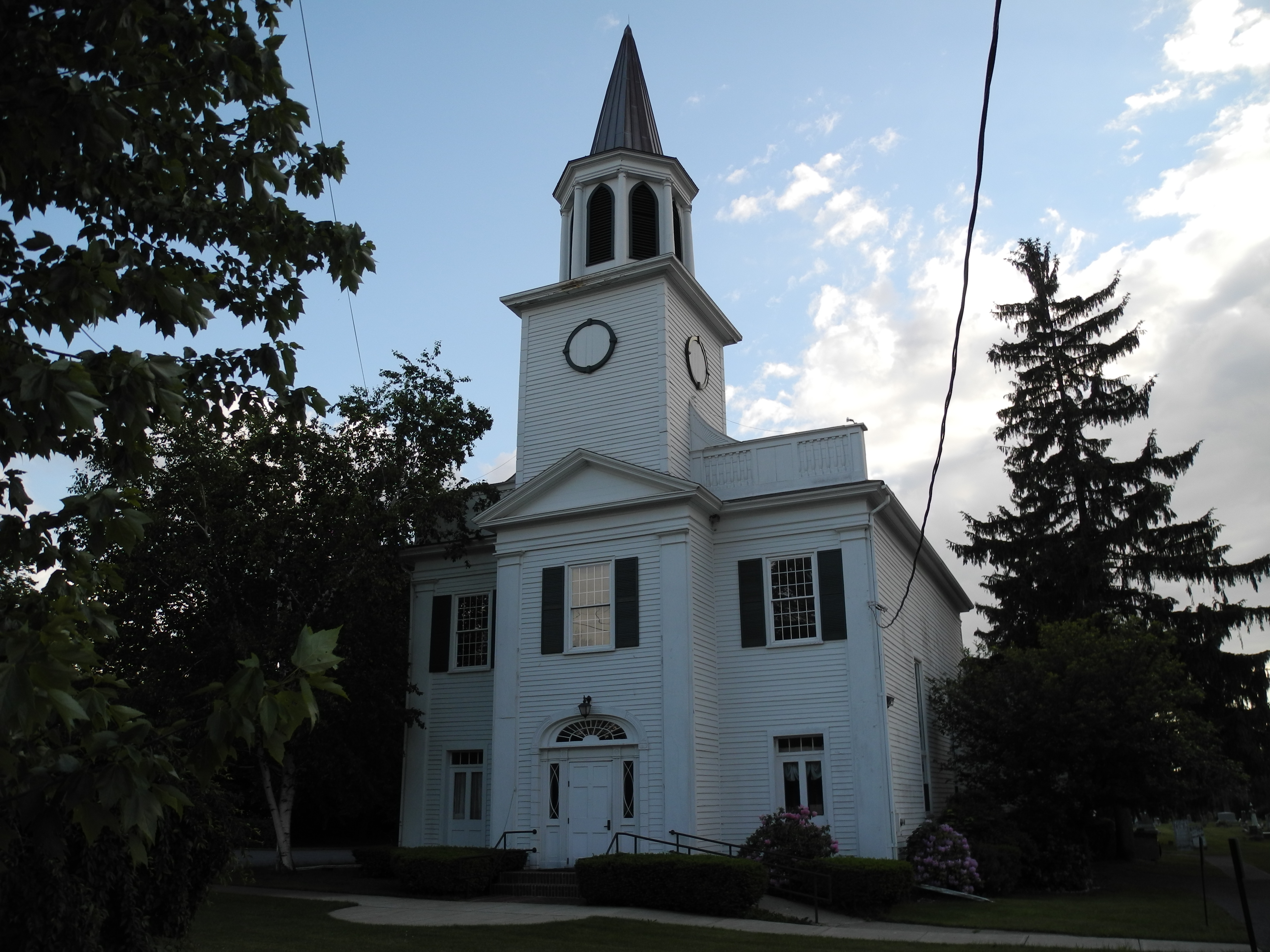

- Location within New York Location within the United States
- Location: 5519 NY 414, Hector, New York
- Coordinates: 42°30′1″N 76°52′23″W
- Area: 5 acres (2.0 ha)
- Built: 1818
- Architectural style: Federal
- NRHP reference No.: 01000547
- Added to NRHP: May 25, 2001

First Presbyterian Church of Hector is a historic Presbyterian church located at Hector in Schuyler County, New York. It was built in 1818 and is a large, rectangular Federal era frame building distinguished by a variety of Georgian inspired design and decorative features in the New England tradition of meeting house architecture. The front facade features a massive, balustraded steeple crowned with a handsome, pyramid-roofed belfry.

It was listed on the National Register of Historic Places in 2001.
