= Hector, New York =

Hector
- Town
- Location within the state of New York
- Coordinates: 42°28′23″N 76°47′37″W
- Country: United States
- State: New York
- County: Schuyler

Area
  - Total: 112.58 sq mi (291.59 km^{2})
  - Land: 102.37 sq mi (265.13 km^{2})
  - Water: 10.22 sq mi (26.46 km^{2})
- Elevation: 1,791 ft (546 m)

Population (2020)
  - Total: 4,916 ▼
  - Estimate (2021): 4,884
  - Density: 48.6/sq mi (18.76/km^{2})
- Time zone: UTC-5 (Eastern (EST))
  - Summer (DST): UTC-4 (EDT)
- ZIP code: 14841
- Area code: 607
- FIPS code: 36-33073
- GNIS feature ID: 0979060
- Website: www.hectorny.us

Hector is a town in the northeastern corner of Schuyler County, New York, United States. The population was 4,916 at the 2020 census. The town is named after Hector, a character from Greek mythology. Hector is west of Ithaca.

== History ==
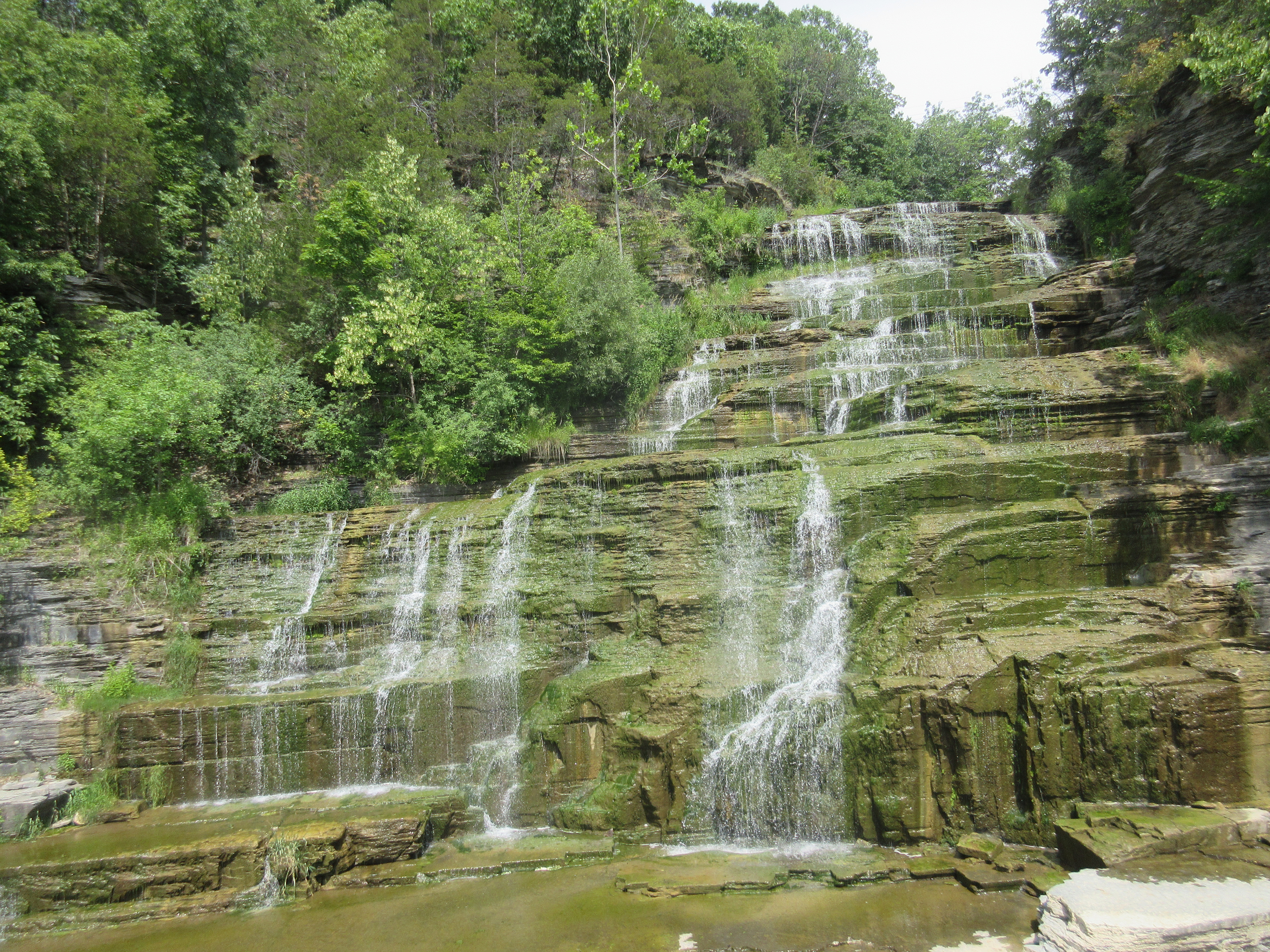
View of the eponymous Hector Falls during the dry season.

The area was originally under the dominion of the Iroquois. The region became part of the Central New York Military Tract, land used to pay soldiers of the American Revolution. The area was first settled around 1790, but the first permanent settler arrived in 1791.

The town of Hector was formed in Cayuga County in 1802 from part of the town of Ovid. However, Hector (including the hamlet of Reynoldsville) was part of the adjacent Seneca County from 1804 to 1817. Hector became part of Tompkins County when the county was created in 1817, and then became part of Schuyler County in 1854 in the part contributed by Tompkins County.

The First Presbyterian Church of Hector was listed on the National Register of Historic Places in 2001.

== Geography ==
According to the United States Census Bureau, the town has a total area of 112.5 square miles (291 km^{2}), of which 102.5 square miles (265 km^{2}) is land and 10.0 square miles (26 km^{2}) (8.88%) is water.

The eastern town line is the border of Tompkins County. The northern town boundary is the border of Seneca County, and the western town line, marked by Seneca Lake is the border of Yates County.

Hector is a town in the Finger Lakes region.

New York State Route 414 is a north-south highway the parallels the east shore of Seneca Lake. New York State Route 79 is an east-west highway in the town. New York State Route 227 and New York State Route 228 intersect in the northeast part of the town at the hamlet of Perry City.

== Demographics ==
Historical population
Census	Pop.	Note	%±
1820	4,012		—
1830	5,212		29.9%
1840	5,652		8.4%
1850	6,052		7.1%
1860	5,623		−7.1%
1870	4,905		−12.8%
1880	5,025		2.4%
1890	4,443		−11.6%
1900	4,137		−6.9%
1910	3,514		−15.1%
1920	3,030		−13.8%
1930	2,904		−4.2%
1940	2,949		1.5%
1950	3,129		6.1%
1960	3,209		2.6%
1970	3,671		14.4%
1980	3,793		3.3%
1990	4,423		16.6%
2000	4,854		9.7%
2010	4,940		1.8%
2020	4,916		−0.5%
2021 (est.)	4,884		−0.7%
U.S. Decennial Census

As of the census of 2000, there were 4,854 people, 1,872 households, and 1,349 families residing in the town. The population density was 47.4 inhabitants per square mile (18.3/km^{2}). There were 2,378 housing units at an average density of 23.2 per square mile (9.0/km^{2}). The racial makeup of the town was 97.82% White, 0.56% African American, 0.39% Native American, 0.23% Asian, 0.14% from other races, and 0.87% from two or more races. Hispanic or Latino of any race were 0.87% of the population.

There were 1,872 households, out of which 34.3% had children under the age of 18 living with them, 58.3% were married couples living together, 8.5% had a female householder with no husband present, and 27.9% were non-families. 20.8% of all households were made up of individuals, and 7.4% had someone living alone who was 65 years of age or older. The average household size was 2.59 and the average family size was 2.98.

In the town, the population was spread out, with 27.1% under the age of 18, 5.9% from 18 to 24, 28.6% from 25 to 44, 27.4% from 45 to 64, and 11.0% who were 65 years of age or older. The median age was 38 years. For every 100 females, there were 103.1 males. For every 100 females age 18 and over, there were 97.5 males.

The median income for a household in the town was $39,380, and the median income for a family was $44,184. Males had a median income of $33,783 versus $21,648 for females. The per capita income for the town was $19,601. About 8.7% of families and 11.6% of the population were below the poverty line, including 18.9% of those under age 18 and 6.3% of those age 65 or over.

== Communities and locations ==
- Bennettsburg – A hamlet on NY Route 79 in the southern part of the town. The community was once called "Hamburgh."
- Burdett – A village east of Seneca Lake on NY-79.
- Cat Elbow Corner – A hamlet at the northern town line.
- Cayutaville – A hamlet in the southeastern corner of the town on County Road 6.
- East Steamburg – A hamlet near the northern town line on County Road 1.
- Finger Lakes National Forest – A national forest in the north-central part of the town.
- Hector Falls Point – A projection into Seneca Lake, west of Burdett.
- Logan – A hamlet at the junction of County Roads 2 and 4 in the western part of Hector. The Logan Methodist Church was listed on the National Register of Historic Places in 2001.
- McIntyre Settlement – A former hamlet along County Road 6 between Strong and Culver roads, approximately one mile south of Mecklenburg.
- Mecklenburg – A hamlet at the junction of County Road 6 and NY-79 near the eastern town line.
- Perry City – A hamlet near the eastern town line by Routes NY-227 and NY-228.
- Reynoldsville – A hamlet on NY-227 near the center of the town.
- Searsburg – A hamlet in the northeastern corner of the town on County Road 1.
- Smith Valley – A hamlet on NY-228 in the southeastern part of the town.
- Valois – A hamlet north of Hector hamlet on NY-414 where Breakneck Creek flows into Seneca Lake (Valois, NY).
