= Nicoll Halsey House and Halseyville Archeological Sites =

Historic house in New York, United States

- U.S. National Register of Historic Places
- U.S. Historic district
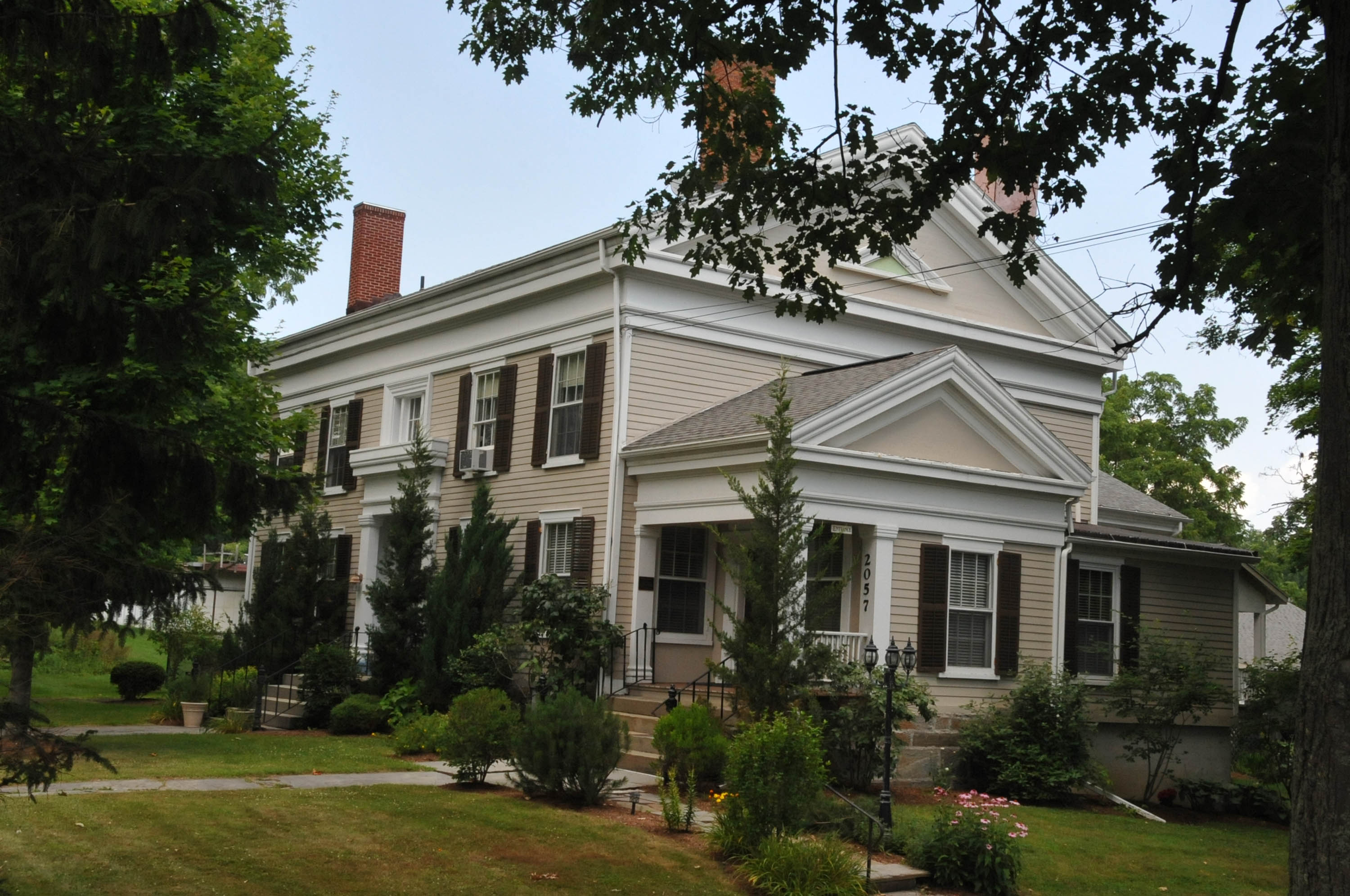

- Location within New York Location within the United States
- Location: Address Restricted, Halseyville, New York
- Coordinates: 42°31′50″N 76°38′15″W
- Area: 9 acres (3.6 ha)
- Built: 1829
- Architectural style: Greek Revival
- NRHP reference No.: 93000504
- Added to NRHP: June 24, 1993

Nicoll Halsey House and Halseyville Archeological Sites is a national historic district and archaeological site located at Halseyville in Tompkins County, New York.

It was listed on the National Register of Historic Places in 1993.
