= Enfield, New York =

- Town
- Location within the state of New York
- Coordinates: 42°26′7″N 76°37′36″W
- Country: United States
- State: New York
- County: Tompkins

Area
  - Total: 36.84 sq mi (95.41 km^{2})
  - Land: 36.73 sq mi (95.14 km^{2})
  - Water: 0.10 sq mi (0.27 km^{2})
- Elevation: 1,112 ft (339 m)

Population (2020)
  - Total: 3,401 ▼
  - Estimate (2021): 3,359
  - Density: 98.0/sq mi (37.85/km^{2})
- Time zone: UTC-5 (Eastern (EST))
  - Summer (DST): UTC-4 (EDT)
- FIPS code: 36-24548
- GNIS feature ID: 0978940

Enfield is a town in Tompkins County, New York, United States. The population was 3,401 at the 2020 census.

The Town of Enfield is located on the western border of the county and is west of Ithaca.

== History ==
The Sullivan Expedition of 1779 passed through the area, which later became part of the Central New York Military Tract.

The town was first settled around 1804. The Town of Enfield was formed in 1821 from part of the Town of Ulysses.

== Geography ==
According to the United States Census Bureau, the town has a total area of 36.9 square miles (96 km^{2}), of which, 36.9 square miles (96 km^{2}) of it is land and 0.04 square miles (0.10 km^{2}) of it (0.05%) is water.

The west town line is the border of Schuyler County. Borders on the North the Town of Ulysses, and on the South the Town of Newfield. The eastern town line is marked by the Town of Ithaca, near Cayuga Lake, one of the Finger Lakes.

New York State Route 79 is an east-west highway in the town and intersects (north-south) New York State Route 327 at Millers Corners.

== Demographics ==
Historical population
Census	Pop.	Note	%±
1830	2,332		—
1840	2,340		0.3%
1850	2,117		−9.5%
1860	1,919		−9.4%
1870	1,693		−11.8%
1880	1,690		−0.2%
1890	1,393		−17.6%
1900	1,214		−12.8%
1910	1,000		−17.6%
1920	867		−13.3%
1930	939		8.3%
1940	1,082		15.2%
1950	1,316		21.6%
1960	1,573		19.5%
1970	2,028		28.9%
1980	2,375		17.1%
1990	3,054		28.6%
2000	3,369		10.3%
2010	3,512		4.2%
2020	3,401		−3.2%
2021 (est.)	3,359		−1.2%
U.S. Decennial Census

As of the census of 2000, there were 3,369 people, 1,323 households, and 891 families residing in the town. The population density was 91.3 inhabitants per square mile (35.3/km^{2}). There were 1,432 housing units at an average density of 38.8 per square mile (15.0/km^{2}). The racial makeup of the town was 94.81% White, 1.87% African American, 0.36% Native American, 0.45% Asian, 0.50% from other races, and 2.02% from two or more races. Hispanic or Latino of any race were 1.69% of the population.

There were 1,323 households, out of which 35.5% had children under the age of 18 living with them, 49.3% were married couples living together, 12.7% had a female householder with no husband present, and 32.6% were non-families. 23.9% of all households were made up of individuals, and 5.5% had someone living alone who was 65 years of age or older. The average household size was 2.55 and the average family size was 3.02.

In the town, the population was spread out, with 27.5% under the age of 18, 7.2% from 18 to 24, 30.3% from 25 to 44, 26.3% from 45 to 64, and 8.8% who were 65 years of age or older. The median age was 36 years. For every 100 females, there were 96.6 males. For every 100 females age 18 and over, there were 96.3 males.

The median income for a household in the town was $36,538, and the median income for a family was $40,183. Males had a median income of $28,000 versus $24,625 for females. The per capita income for the town was $16,795. About 11.9% of families and 13.5% of the population were below the poverty line, including 23.2% of those under age 18 and 2.8% of those age 65 or over.

== Communities and locations in Enfield ==
- Applegate Corner – A location marked by the intersection of NY-79 and Applegate Road.
- Black Oaks Corner – A location marked by the intersection of Harvey Hill Rd and Black Oak Road.
- Bostwick Corners – A hamlet at the intersection of NY-327 with Bostwick Rd. to East and Harvey Hill Road. to West.
- Christian Hill – A hamlet on the north town line.
- Enfield Center (or "Enfield") – The hamlet of Enfield Center on NY-327 at intersection of Enfield Center Roads (East and West).
- Enfield Elementary School – The only public school in Enfield; older students go to secondary schools in the surrounding towns and cities, located on Enfield Main Road (NY Route 327) near its terminus at NY Route 79.
- Enfield Glen – A gorge in Robert H. Treman State Park, near the south town line.
- Hayt Corner – A location in the northeast part of Enfield.
- Kennedy Corner – A location on NY-79.
- Millers Corners – Intersection of NY-79 with Enfield Main Road (NY-327) to the South and Halseyville Road to the North.
- Roloson Corner – Intersection of NY-79 with Black Oak Road to the South and Waterburg Road to the North.
- Van Dorn Corner – A location on NY-79.
- Whipple Corner – A hamlet on the east town line.
