= Odessa, New York =

- Village
- Location within the state of New York
- Coordinates: 42°20′11″N 76°47′21″W
- Country: United States
- State: New York
- County: Schuyler

Area
  - Total: 1.14 sq mi (2.94 km^{2})
  - Land: 1.14 sq mi (2.94 km^{2})
  - Water: 0 sq mi (0.00 km^{2})
- Elevation: 1,043 ft (318 m)

Population (2020)
  - Total: 517
  - Density: 454.9/sq mi (175.63/km^{2})
- Time zone: UTC-5 (Eastern (EST))
  - Summer (DST): UTC-4 (EDT)
- ZIP code: 14869
- Area code: 607
- FIPS code: 36-54452
- GNIS feature ID: 0959224
- Website: Village of Odessa

Odessa is a village in Schuyler County, New York, United States.

The population was 517 at the 2020 census.

The Village of Odessa is in the western side of the Town of Catharine near the town line and is shared with the Town of Montour. Odessa is north of Elmira, New York.

== History ==
The land on which the Village of Odessa sits was originally part of the Watkins-Flint land purchase John W. Watkins and Royal Flint and associates of New York City, in 1794, following an application to the New York Commissioners of the Land-Office in 1791. The 200 acres Odessa was laid out on was originally given to Phineas Catlin Sr. for military service.

The following is a timeline of major events in Odessa history:

1801 – R.C Johnson built first building – Grist Mill on Catlin Creek was later bought by Phineas Catlin Jr., but was torn down and rebuilt in 1837.

1836 – John Foster built a building on the site of Odessa House and part of that building is incorporated into the current structure.

1837 – Phineas Catlin Jr. built the first sawmill, on Catlin Creek.

1839 – The village was surveyed by John Foster. The unincorporated village was then known as Catlin Mills.

1841 – Freewill Baptist Church formed.

1845 – Name changed to Odessa by prominent Odessa businessman John I. Lawrence and John Foster with the blessing of Phineas Catlin. It is unknown why they picked that name.

1850s – First school was a log cabin located in the area of Speedway. Shortly after, it was moved to second location on Church Street just north of the old Baptist on the west side of street (currently a private residence).

1854 – Schuyler County formed. Odessa was in five counties previously before Schuyler was formed due to changing boundary lines. They were Tryon (1772), Albany (1776), Montgomery (1784), Tioga (1791) and Chemung (1836). 1855 – First Post Office. Joseph L. Darling appointed first postmaster May 24, 1855.

1856 – First Church Built (Baptist Church). 1872 – Phineas Catlin Jr. Saw Mill burned – rebuilt.

1875 – School moved to College Ave. near current location of High School.

1876 (October 23) – Large fire on the south side of Main Street destroyed four building including 2 stores, a barn and a residence.

1877 – Odessa became a "dry" town until after the repeal of prohibition.

1878 – A great storm washed out Mill Pond Dam and the Mill St. bridge over Catlin Creek. 1884 – First telephone poles/lines installed and phone switchboard in Montgomery Store.

1892 (Feb 7) – Lehigh Valley Railroad track laid and depot completed.

1903 – Odessa incorporated as a Village. 1905 – A fire hand pumper, hose cart, a ladder and some hose was purchased.

1905 – First horse races on Mitchell Farm. Speedway is named after the horse track. Previously that street was known as the Boulevard.

1908 – Union School officially established and a 2nd story addition added to school.

1910 – Odessa Hose & Chemical Company (Odessa Fire Department). Incorporated on May 4. 1910 – Electric lights replaced kerosene lanterns for street lighting.

1911 – Odessa cemetery graves moved from Main Street to Laurel Hill Cemetery.

1912 – Odessa Opera House built (Village Offices & Fire Department) on site of former cemetery.

1912 – State road built from Montour to Alpine utilizing Main Street including the addition of sidewalks.

1926 – Village purchased first motorized fire truck.

1928 – Fire on Main Street destroyed 2 buildings.

1938 – Odessa water system built utilizing spring water from the Magee fish ponds on Mecklenburg Road.

1946 – Lehigh Valley passenger service discontinued in Odessa. Freight business continued.

1961 – The large Cotton Hanlon retail store located just south of the village was completely destroyed by fire in August. This is considered the largest fire ever to occur in the area.

1966 – Large storage building owned by Cotton-Hanlon burned on Railroad Avenue.

1968 – The Village Hall & Fire House (Opera House) was condemned by N.Y. State.

1970 – New Village Hall & Fire House built. Old Village Hall was torn down.

1976 – A large fire heavily damaged the Agway store on Railroad Avenue.

1976 – Lehigh Valley railroad goes bankrupt. Tracks abandoned and eventually removed.

2000 – The water system was upgraded and redesigned.

2003 – The Village of Odessa celebrated its 100th anniversary since its incorporation.

2010 – Odessa voters rejected a proposal to dissolve the village into the surrounding towns of Catharine and Montour in a vote on December 7, 2010.

Keith T. Pierce was the mayor from 2009 to 2018.

On April 16, 2018, Gerry Messmer, a retired Army Lieutenant Colonel with more than 30 years military experience, was sworn in as Mayor of the Village of Odessa.

2019 – Dylan Houseknecht becomes the first New York State Wrestling Champion in Odessa-Montour Central School history and the first student athlete to win an individual State Championship in any sport for Odessa-Montour.

Frank Garrison, who competed on the third season of Survivor, Survivor: Africa was listed as being from Odessa.

== Geography ==
Odessa is located at 42°20′11″N 76°47′21″W (42.336328, -76.789069).

Odessa is at the junction of Routes County Roads 7 and 15 and New York State Route 224 and New York State Route 228. The village is south of the south end of Seneca Lake.

== Demographics ==
Historical population
Census	Pop.	Note	%±
1880	230		—
1910	330		—
1920	366		10.9%
1930	379		3.6%
1940	424		11.9%
1950	526		24.1%
1960	573		8.9%
1970	606		5.8%
1980	613		1.2%
1990	986		60.8%
2000	617		−37.4%
2010	591		−4.2%
2020	517		−12.5%
U.S. Decennial Census

As of the census of 2010, there were 591 people, 246 households, and 164 families residing in the village. The population density was 509.1 inhabitants per square mile (196.6/km^{2}). There were 261 housing units at an average density of 215.4 per square mile (83.2/km^{2}). The racial makeup of the village was 96.60% White, 0.81% African American, 0.16% Native American, 1.62% from other races, and 0.81% from two or more races. Hispanic or Latino of any race were 1.46% of the population.

There were 246 households, out of which 34.1% had children under the age of 18 living with them, 52.4% were married couples living together, 12.6% had a female householder with no husband present, and 33.3% were non-families. 29.3% of all households were made up of individuals, and 13.8% had someone living alone who was 65 years of age or older. The average household size was 2.46 and the average family size was 3.04.

In the village, the population was spread out, with 25.8% under the age of 18, 8.1% from 18 to 24, 27.4% from 25 to 44, 25.8% from 45 to 64, and 13.0% who were 65 years of age or older. The median age was 37 years. For every 100 females, there were 87.0 males. For every 100 females age 18 and over, there were 84.7 males.

The median income for a household in the village was $41,250, and the median income for a family was $51,429. Males had a median income of $27,969 versus $27,143 for females. The per capita income for the village was $18,639. About 8.8% of families and 8.9% of the population were below the poverty line, including 12.0% of those under age 18 and 8.1% of those age 65 or over.

== Sources ==
- Parry, Albert (Spring 1944). "US towns named Odessa". Russian Review. 3 (2): 30–43. doi:10.2307/125407. JSTOR 125407. Archived from the original on March 3, 2016.
