= Burdett, New York =

- Village
- Location within the state of New York
- Coordinates: 42°24′57″N 76°50′57″W
- Country: United States
- State: New York
- County: Schuyler

Area
  - Total: 0.96 sq mi (2.49 km^{2})
  - Land: 0.96 sq mi (2.49 km^{2})
  - Water: 0 sq mi (0.00 km^{2})
- Elevation: 978 ft (298 m)

Population (2020)
  - Total: 331
  - Density: 344.1/sq mi (132.86/km^{2})
- Time zone: UTC-5 (Eastern (EST))
  - Summer (DST): UTC-4 (EDT)
- ZIP code: 14818
- Area code: 607
- FIPS code: 36-11132
- GNIS feature ID: 0973990

Burdett is a village in Schuyler County, New York, United States. As of the 2020 census, Burdett had a population of 331.

The Village of Burdett is within the Town of Hector, east of Seneca Lake and northeast of Watkins Glen.

== History ==
The village is the site of the first settlement in the Town of Hector, circa 1790.

== Geography ==
Burdett is located at 42°24′57″N 76°50′57″W (42.415960, -76.849250).

According to the United States Census Bureau, the village has a total area of 1.0 square mile (2.6 km^{2}), all land.

New York State Route 79 and Logan Creek pass through the village. Burdett is in the Finger Lakes District.

The Finger Lakes Trail, a 584-mile footpath that travels from western to eastern New York State and the through the southern Finger Lakes region of New York State also goes through the Burdett village center, entering from the west, into the village center, then heading north toward the Finger Lakes National Forest.

== Demographics ==
Historical population
Census	Pop.	Note	%±
1860	360		—
1900	409		—
1910	382		−6.6%
1920	380		−0.5%
1930	310		−18.4%
1940	408		31.6%
1950	432		5.9%
1960	420		−2.8%
1970	454		8.1%
1980	410		−9.7%
1990	372		−9.3%
2000	357		−4.0%
2010	340		−4.8%
2020	331		−2.6%
U.S. Decennial Census

As of the census of 2000, there were 357 people, 147 households, and 97 families residing in the village. The population density was 369.5 inhabitants per square mile (142.7/km^{2}). There were 171 housing units at an average density of 177.0 per square mile (68.3/km^{2}). The racial makeup of the village was 99.16% White, and 0.56% Native American. 0.28% African American, Hispanic or Latino of any race were 0.28% of the population.

There were 147 households, out of which 27.2% had children under the age of 18 living with them, 49.0% were married couples living together, 10.9% had a female householder with no husband present, and 34.0% were non-families. 27.2% of all households were made up of individuals, and 11.6% had someone living alone who was 65 years of age or older. The average household size was 2.43 and the average family size was 2.86.

In the village, the population was spread out, with 23.8% under the age of 18, 6.4% from 18 to 24, 30.0% from 25 to 44, 26.3% from 45 to 64, and 13.4% who were 65 years of age or older. The median age was 38 years. For every 100 females, there were 87.9 males. For every 100 females age 18 and over, there were 85.0 males.

The median income for a household in the village was $36,023, and the median income for a family was $40,250. Males had a median income of $30,192 versus $22,031 for females. The per capita income for the village was $16,588. About 4.7% of families and 8.2% of the population were below the poverty line, including 5.9% of those under age 18 and 7.7% of those age 65 or over.
