= New York State Route 79 =

Highway in New York

New York State Route 79
- Map of central New York with NY 79 highlighted in red

Route information
- Maintained by NYSDOT and the city of Ithaca
- Length: 93.18 mi (149.96 km)
- Existed: 1930–present

Major junctions
- West end: NY 414 in Hector
- NY 13 / NY 34 / NY 96 in Ithaca; I-81 in Lisle; US 11 / NY 26 in Whitney Point; I-88 in Colesville; I-86 / NY 17 in Windsor village
- East end: PA 92 at the Pennsylvania state line in Windsor town

Location
- Country: United States
- State: New York
- Counties: Schuyler, Tompkins, Tioga, Broome, Chenango

Highway system
- New York Highways; Interstate; US; State; Reference; Parkways
← NY 78	→ NY 80

New York State Route 79 (NY 79) is a 93.18-mile-long (149.96 km) east–west state highway in the Southern Tier of New York, in the United States. The western terminus of the route is at the intersection with NY 414 near the southern end of Seneca Lake just northeast of Watkins Glen. Its eastern terminus is at the Pennsylvania state line in the town of Windsor in Broome County, where it connects to Pennsylvania Route 92 (PA 92). NY 79 passes through three regions; it starts in the Finger Lakes region, runs through Central New York and ends on the western fringes of the Catskills. The route is signed east–west, but from Whitney Point to the state line it runs in a north–south orientation and is signed north–south a few miles south of Center Village, a hamlet that is a few miles south of Harpursville.

Portions of NY 79 parallel waterways. Between Whitney Point and Chenango Forks, it runs along the eastern bank of the Tioughnioga River. From the town of Colesville to the Pennsylvania border, NY 79 runs along the western bank of the Susquehanna River. NY 79 also begins adjacent to Seneca Lake and passes near Cayuga Lake.

NY 79 serves the city of Ithaca and connects to three Interstate Highways: Interstate 81 (I-81) near Whitney Point; I-88 in Harpursville; and I-86 in the village of Windsor. The route also passes through the villages of Lisle and Burdett.

== Route description ==
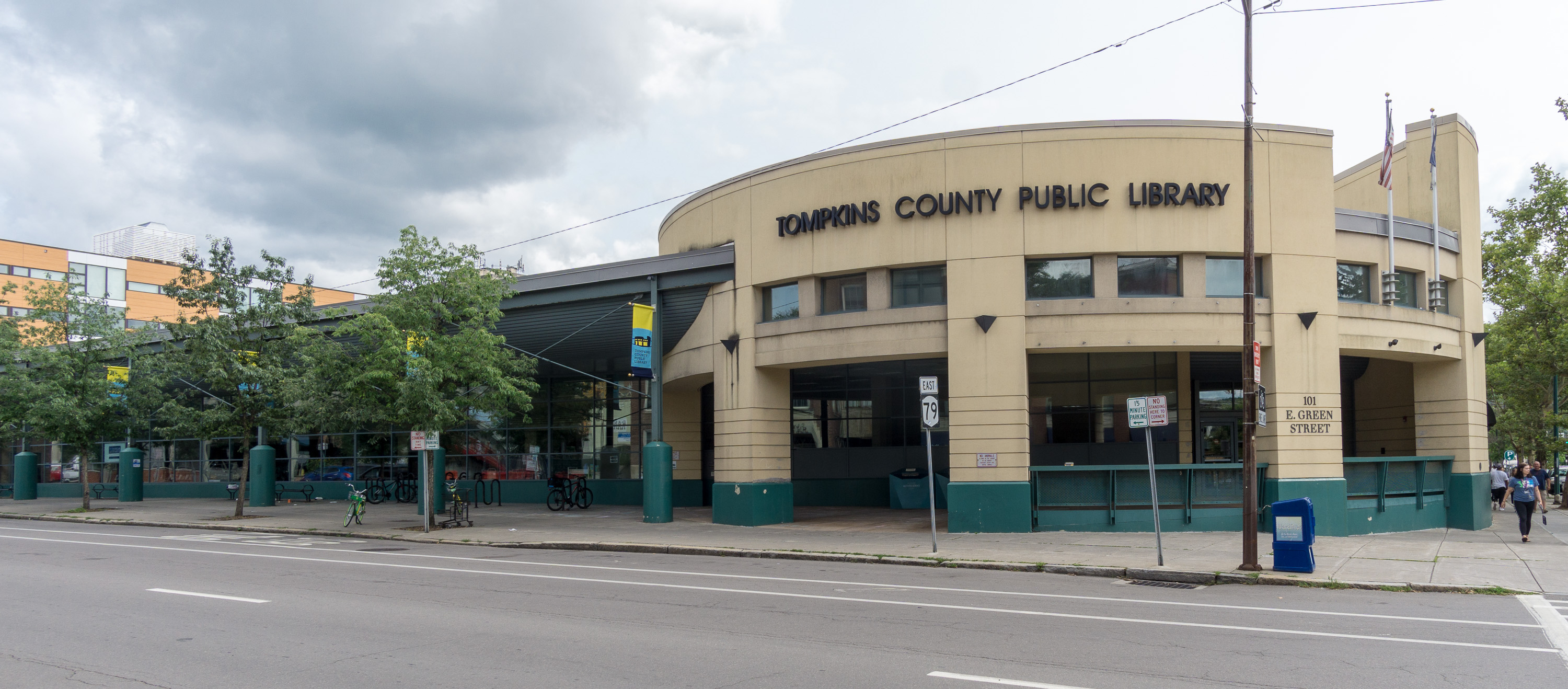
Tompkins County Public Library is located on Route 79 in downtown Ithaca, where it is known as Green Street

=== Schuyler and Tompkins counties ===
NY 79 begins at an intersection with NY 414 just north of the Watkins Glen village limits in the Schuyler County town of Hector. The route heads north, climbing the side of the large bluff along the eastern edge of Seneca Lake. At the top of the hill, NY 79 enters the village of Burdett as Main Street. As it passes through the village, NY 79 turns eastward as Lake Avenue. East of Burdett, the route passes through the hamlet of Bennettsburg prior to intersecting NY 227. While NY 227 heads north to serve Reynoldsville, NY 79 continues east to Mecklenburg, the site of its junction with NY 228.

East of Mecklenburg, NY 79 passes into Tompkins County and the town of Enfield. As Mecklenburg Road, it heads eastward through rolling farmland and hills toward the city of Ithaca. It intersects NY 327 at Enfield Corners in this stretch. As NY 79 approaches downtown Ithaca, it becomes Hector Street and curves to the northeast, then to the southeast as it descends to Cayuga Lake. At the base of the hill, the route crosses the Cayuga Inlet and enters downtown, where it splits into a one-way couplet along State Street (eastbound) and Seneca Street (westbound). NY 79 eastbound shifts one block south at Fulton Street (NY 13, NY 34, and NY 96 southbound) to use Green Street. The one-way couplet ends one block east of Aurora Street at the "Tuning Fork" as Green and Seneca streets merge into East State Street, recently double-named Martin Luther King Jr. Street. NY 79 follows State Street southeastward through eastern Ithaca into the town of Ithaca. The portions of NY 79 between the Ithaca west city line and NY 13A, between NY 89/96 and Meadow Street (NY 13/34/96 northbound) and between Green Street and the Ithaca east city line are maintained by the city.

The portion of NY 79 east of the city limits is markedly more rural. It heads southeastward as Slaterville Road through the towns of Ithaca, Dryden, and Caroline, serving several small communities along the route. NY 79 crosses into Tioga County upon passing over the west branch of Owego Creek.

=== Tioga, Broome, and Chenango counties ===
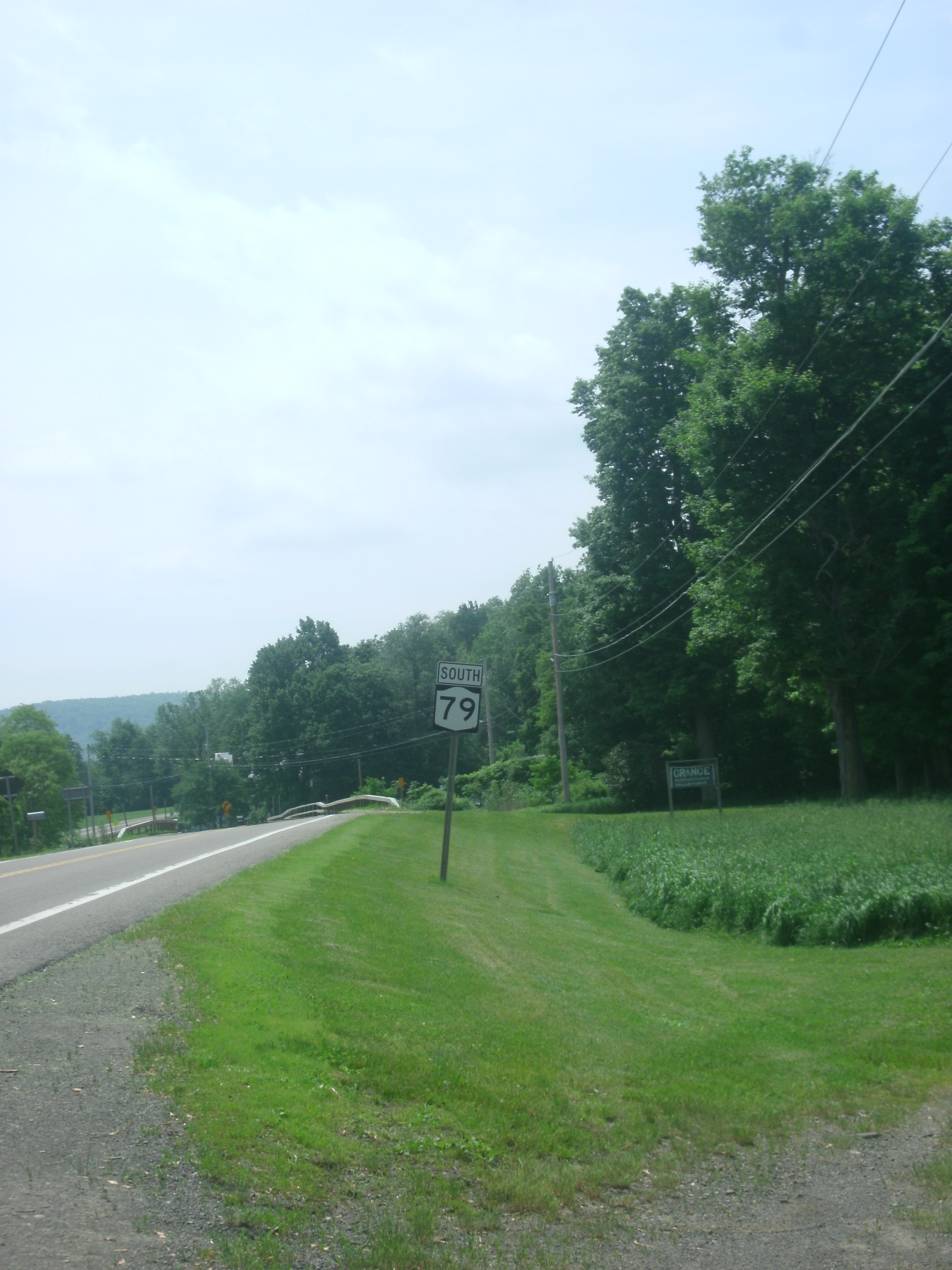
NY 79 heading southbound through Windsor from the intersection with Broome CR 16

NY 79's stay in Tioga County is wholly confined to the town of Richford. The routing of NY 79 in Richford is hilly and heavily rural, with the one exception being at NY 79's junction with NY 38 in the hamlet of Richford. The route heads into Broome County, where it meets U.S. Route 11 (US 11) in the town of Lisle just east of the Lisle village limits. NY 79 joins US 11 southward along the Tioughnioga River to a partial interchange with I-81 at exit 8. The overlap continues to Whitney Point, a village situated at the confluence of the Tioughnioga and Otselic Rivers. In the village, NY 79 leaves US 11 in favor of a short overlap with NY 26 across the Tioughnioga River. On the opposite bank, NY 26 and NY 79 split at a junction that also features NY 206.

South of Whitney Point, NY 79 continues southeast along the Tioughnioga River to the vicinity of Chenango Forks, where it intersects NY 12. It briefly joins NY 12 along the banks of the Chenango River, then crosses the river and enters the town of Fenton. About 3 miles (5 km), NY 79 veers into Chenango County for just under 1 mile (1.6 km) before reentering Broome County. The route heads onward through the rural towns of Fenton and Colesville, where it meets NY 7. NY 79 runs concurrent with NY 7 to Harpursville. Here, NY 79 turns southeast and connects to I-88. Past I-88, the route follows the western bank of the Susquehanna River southward through Ouaquaga, once a large Iroquois village which was destroyed by the Continental Army in 1778, to the village of Windsor. Inside the village, NY 79 meets NY 17 at an interchange that is also the temporary eastern terminus of I-86's eastern segment. NY 79 continues along the Susquehanna River to the New York–Pennsylvania border, where the road becomes PA 92 upon crossing the state line.

== History ==
From Lisle to its western end, NY 79 almost exactly follows the Catskill Turnpike, originally maintained by the Susquehanna and Bath Turnpike Company, which also maintained the Catskill Turnpike east to Bainbridge along NY 206, and east along local roads and NY 54 to Bath. The only notable deviations are local, for easier grades, including along the "hogback" eskers near Center Lisle, and the westbound climb out of Ithaca as a looping Hector Street in place of the original straight climb from halfway up that street (still visible as a right-of-way).

NY 79 was assigned as part of the 1930 renumbering of state highways in New York. It initially began at NY 15 (modern NY 96) in Trumansburg and ended at the Pennsylvania state line south of the village of Windsor. In between, NY 79 passed through Mecklenburg, Ithaca, and Harpursville. Also assigned as part of the renumbering was NY 227, a highway connecting NY 79 in Perry City to NY 44 (now NY 414) in Watkins Glen.

The Perry City–Trumansburg portion of NY 79 became an extension of NY 227 in the early 1940s. NY 79 was then truncated southward to its junction with NY 227 in Perry City. In the early 1960s, NY 79 was rerouted to follow a previously unnumbered highway west of Mecklenburg to NY 227. From there, NY 79 continued to Watkins Glen over the routing of NY 227. As a result, NY 227 was truncated to its current southern terminus south of Reynoldsville. The former routing of NY 79 from Mecklenburg to Perry City became part of an extended NY 228.

On April 4, 2022, work began to replace the bridge that carries NY 79 over the Chenengo River. The new bridge will be built about 0.5 miles (0.80 km) upstream of the current bridge. The $12.6 million project is expected to be completed by Fall 2023.

== Major intersections ==
County	Location	mi	km	Destinations	Notes
Schuyler	Hector	0.00	0.00	NY 414 – Ovid, Watkins Glen	Western terminus
Schuyler	Hector	6.22	10.01	NY 227 north – Trumansburg	Southern terminus of NY 227
Schuyler	Hector	10.15	16.33	NY 228 north	Western end of concurrency with NY 228; hamlet of Mecklenburg
Schuyler	Hector	10.25	16.50	NY 228 south	Eastern end of concurrency with NY 228; hamlet of Mecklenburg
Tompkins	Enfield	14.41	23.19	NY 327 south	Northern terminus of NY 327; hamlet of Millers Corners
Tompkins	Ithaca	21.07	33.91	NY 13A south (Floral Avenue)	Northern terminus of NY 13A
Tompkins	Ithaca	21.33	34.33	NY 13 south / NY 34 south / NY 96 south (Fulton Street) – Ithaca College	NY 79 east follows Fulton Street south for one block to access Green Street, western end of NY 13, NY 34, and NY 96 concurrency
Tompkins	Ithaca	21.44	34.50	NY 13 north / NY 34 north / NY 96 north (Meadow Street)	
Tompkins	Ithaca	22.69	36.52	NY 366 east (Mitchell Street)	Western terminus of NY 366
Tioga	Richford	39.67	63.84	NY 38 – Owego, Cortland	
Broome	Lisle	50.60	81.43	US 11 north – Killawog	Western end of concurrency with US 11
Broome	Triangle	51.80	83.36	I-81 north – Cortland, Syracuse	Exit 30 on I-81
Broome	Whitney Point	52.81	84.99	US 11 south / NY 26 south to I-81 south – Binghamton	Eastern end of concurrency with US 11; western end of concurrency with NY 26; Exit 29 on I-81
Broome	Whitney Point	52.94	85.20	NY 26 north / NY 206 – Greene, Cincinnatus	Eastern end of concurrency with NY 26; western terminus of NY 206
Broome	Barker	61.93	99.67	NY 12 south – Binghamton	Western end of concurrency with NY 12; hamlet of Chenango Forks
Broome	Barker	62.20	100.10	NY 12 north – Greene	Eastern end of concurrency with NY 12
Broome	Fenton	64.80	104.29	NY 369 south	Hamlet of North Fenton; northern terminus of NY 369
Chenango	No major junctions				
Broome	Colesville	74.24	119.48	NY 7 west – Binghamton	Western end of concurrency with NY 7
Broome	Colesville	75.48	121.47	NY 7 east – Nineveh	Eastern end of concurrency with NY 7
Broome	Colesville	75.57	121.62	I-88 – Binghamton, Albany	Exit 6 on I-88; hamlet of Harpursville
Broome	Village of Windsor	87.06	140.11	I-86 west / NY 17 (Quickway) – Binghamton, New York City	Current eastern terminus of I-86; exit 79 on I-86/NY 17
Broome	Town of Windsor	93.18	149.96	PA 92 south	Continuation into Pennsylvania
1.000 mi = 1.609 km; 1.000 km = 0.621 mi: Concurrency terminus
