= Ulysses, New York =

- Town
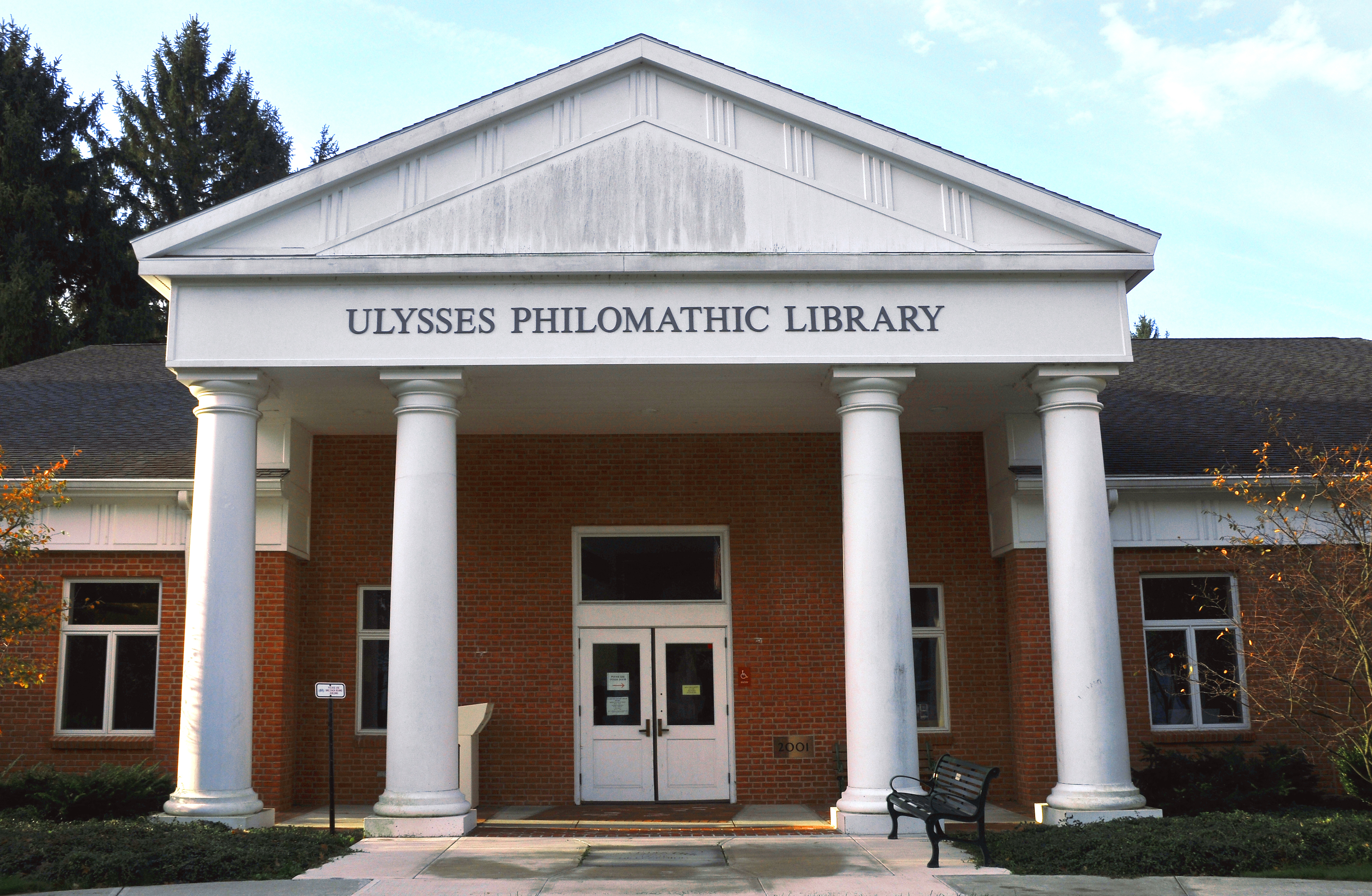
- Ulysses Public Library

- Location within the state of New York
- Coordinates: 42°31′6″N 76°36′56″W
- Country: United States
- State: New York
- County: Tompkins

Area
  - Total: 36.92 sq mi (95.61 km^{2})
  - Land: 32.89 sq mi (85.18 km^{2})
  - Water: 4.03 sq mi (10.43 km^{2})
- Elevation: 981 ft (299 m)

Population (2020)
  - Total: 4,940 ▲
  - Estimate (2021): 4,882
  - Density: 154.7/sq mi (59.72/km^{2})
- Time zone: UTC-5 (Eastern (EST))
  - Summer (DST): UTC-4 (EDT)
- FIPS code: 36-75990
- GNIS feature ID: 0979570
- Website: https://townofulyssesny.gov/

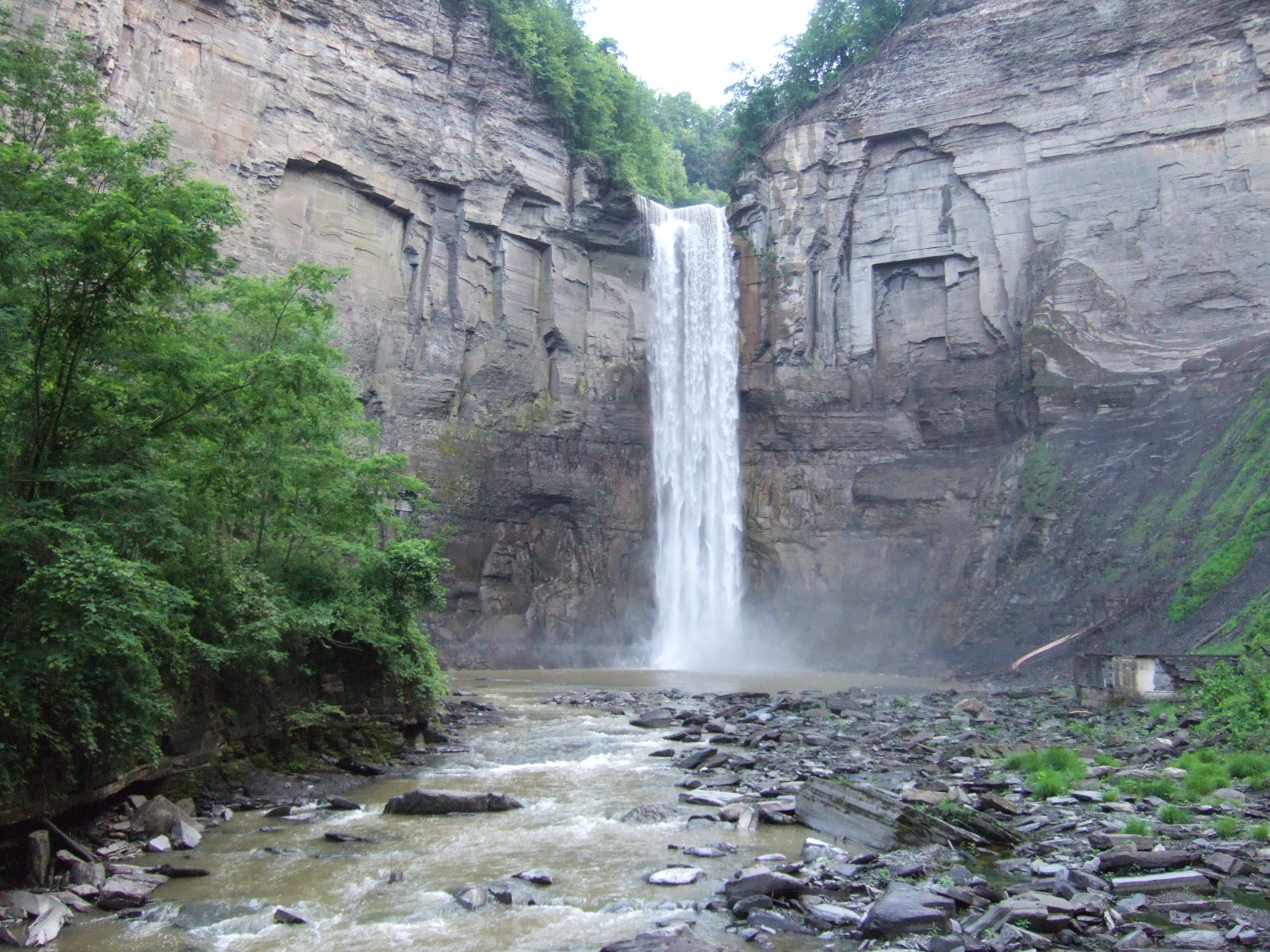
Taughannock Falls State Park is located in Ulysses

Ulysses is a town located in northwest Tompkins County, New York, U.S. The population was 4,940 at the 2020 census. The town was named after the hero of the Odyssey.

The Town of Ulysses is northwest of the city of Ithaca and is in the northwest part of Tompkins County.

Taughannock Falls, the highest waterfall in the state, is in Ulysses in Taughannock Falls State Park. The falls drop 215 feet (66 m), farther than Niagara Falls, making Taughannock Falls one of the highest waterfalls east of the Rocky Mountains.

== Geography ==
According to the United States Census Bureau, Ulysses has a total area of 36.8 square miles (95 km^{2}), of which 33.0 square miles (85 km^{2}) is land and 3.9 square miles (10 km^{2}), or 10.48%, is water.

The eastern town line is at Cayuga Lake, one of the Finger Lakes. The town's northern boundary line is the border of Seneca County.

New York State Route 89 is a north-south highway near Cayuga Lake. New York State Route 96 is a northwest to southeast highway through the town.

== History ==
Ulysses is located in the former Central New York Military Tract, which was used to pay soldiers of the American Revolution. It was named by Robert Harpur in 1790 for the hero of Homer's Odyssey. The town was first settled around 1790.

The town once contained the towns of Dryden (est. 1803), Enfield (est. 1821) and Ithaca (est. 1821 and named for Ulysses' home in ancient Greece). Ulysses was organized in 1794 while still a part of Onondaga County. The village of Trumansburg, the main settlement in Ulysses, was started by Abner Treman in 1792.

== Demographics ==
Historical population
Census	Pop.	Note	%±
1820	6,345		—
1830	3,130		−50.7%
1840	2,976		−4.9%
1850	3,122		4.9%
1860	3,339		7.0%
1870	3,271		−2.0%
1880	3,458		5.7%
1890	2,954		−14.6%
1900	2,776		−6.0%
1910	2,612		−5.9%
1920	2,105		−19.4%
1930	2,382		13.2%
1940	2,584		8.5%
1950	3,474		34.4%
1960	4,307		24.0%
1970	4,500		4.5%
1980	4,666		3.7%
1990	4,906		5.1%
2000	4,775		−2.7%
2010	4,900		2.6%
2020	4,940		0.8%
2021 (est.)	4,882		−1.2%
U.S. Decennial Census

As of the census of 2000, there were 4,775 people, 1,986 households, and 1,314 families residing in the town. The population density was 144.8 inhabitants per square mile (55.9/km^{2}). There were 2,198 housing units at an average density of 66.6 per square mile (25.7/km^{2}). The racial makeup of the town was 96.50% White, 1.11% African American, 0.10% Native American, 0.77% Asian, 0.02% Pacific Islander, 0.38% from other races, and 1.11% from two or more races. Hispanic or Latino of any race were 1.17% of the population.

There were 1,986 households, out of which 32.4% had children under the age of 18 living with them, 53.0% were married couples living together, 9.1% had a female householder with no husband present, and 33.8% were non-families. 27.5% of all households were made up of individuals, and 11.2% had someone living alone who was 65 years of age or older. The average household size was 2.37 and the average family size was 2.89.

Age demographics show that 24.7% are under the age of 18, 5.5% from 18 to 24, 25.7% from 25 to 44, 29.5% from 45 to 64, and 14.6% who were 65 years of age or older. The median age was 42 years. For every 100 females, there were 90.8 males. For every 100 females age 18 and over, there were 87.0 males.

The median income for a household in the town was $45,066, and the median income for a family was $54,167. Males had a median income of $36,313 versus $26,810 for females. The per capita income for the town was $22,516. About 4.3% of families and 7.0% of the population were below the poverty line, including 7.8% of those under age 18 and 6.1% of those age 65 or over.

== Notable people ==
- Hannibal Goodwin, inventor who patented an early method for making film stock
- Nicoll Halsey, politician who served in the U.S. House of Representatives from 1833 to 1835
- J. G. Hertzler, actor in the Star Trek franchise; member of the Ulysses Town Board from 2016 to 2020

== Communities and locations in the Town of Ulysses ==
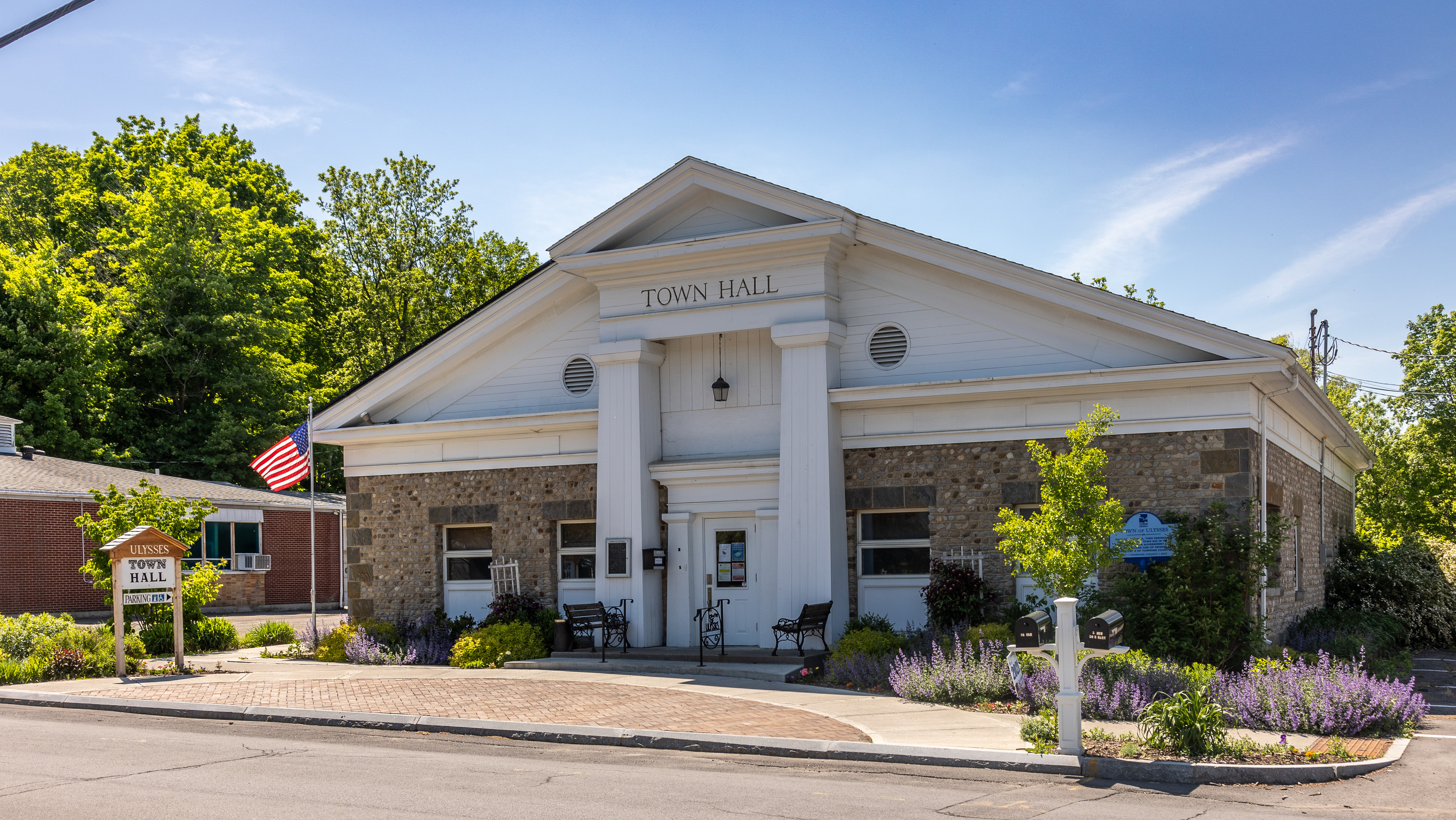
Ulysses Town Hall

- Christian Hill – A location on the south town line by the southeast corner of Ulysses.
- DuBoise Corner – A hamlet near Cayuga Lake in the southeast part of the town.
- Halseyville – A hamlet, named after the Halsey family, early settlers, southeast of Trumansburg. The Nicoll Halsey House and Halseyville Archeological Sites was listed on the National Register of Historic Places in 1993.
- Jacksonville – A hamlet previously named "Harlows Corners" and "Van Cortland Village," prior to being renamed after Andrew Jackson. It is southeast of Trumansburg on NY-96.
- Krum's Corner – A hamlet, named after the Krum family, early settlers, in the southeast part of the town on NY-96.
- Perry City – A hamlet founded by The Religious Society of Friends (Quakers), and still home to the original Quaker Meeting House. The community is just past the west town line.
- Podunk – A hamlet named after the sound of water passing over a mill wheel. It is located south of Trumansburg.
- Taughannock Creek – A stream flowing through the state park and forming a waterfall.
- Taughannock Falls – (1) One of the highest single-drop waterfalls East of the Rocky Mountains, (2) A hamlet southeast of Trumansburg.
- Taughannock Falls State Park – A state park in the northeast corner of the town.
- Taughannock Point – A projection into Cayuga Lake in the northeast corner of the town.
- Trumansburg – The Village of Trumansburg is in the northwest part of the town on NY-96.
- Waterburg – A hamlet south of Trumansburg.
- Willow Creek – An area surrounding Willow Creek (A stream flowing into Cayuga Lake), which feeds into Cayuga Lake at Goodwin's Point (current site of Taughannock Falls State Park). The 'neighborhood' consists of the entirety of Gorge Road, Kraft Road, Garrett Road, Houghton Road, Albrectson Road, and Willow Creek Road. Also, portions of Duboise Road (from Perry City to Kraft Roads), Krums Corners Road (from Duboise Road to Smith Farm), Agard Road (from Taughannock Blvd. to Jacksonville Road), Jacksonville Road (from Kraft Road to Gorge Road), and Taughannock Blvd (from Garrett Road to Gorge Road). Residents in the neighborhood have held an annual community picnic at Taughannock Falls State Park since 1950.
