= Schuyler County, New York =

County in New York, United States

- County
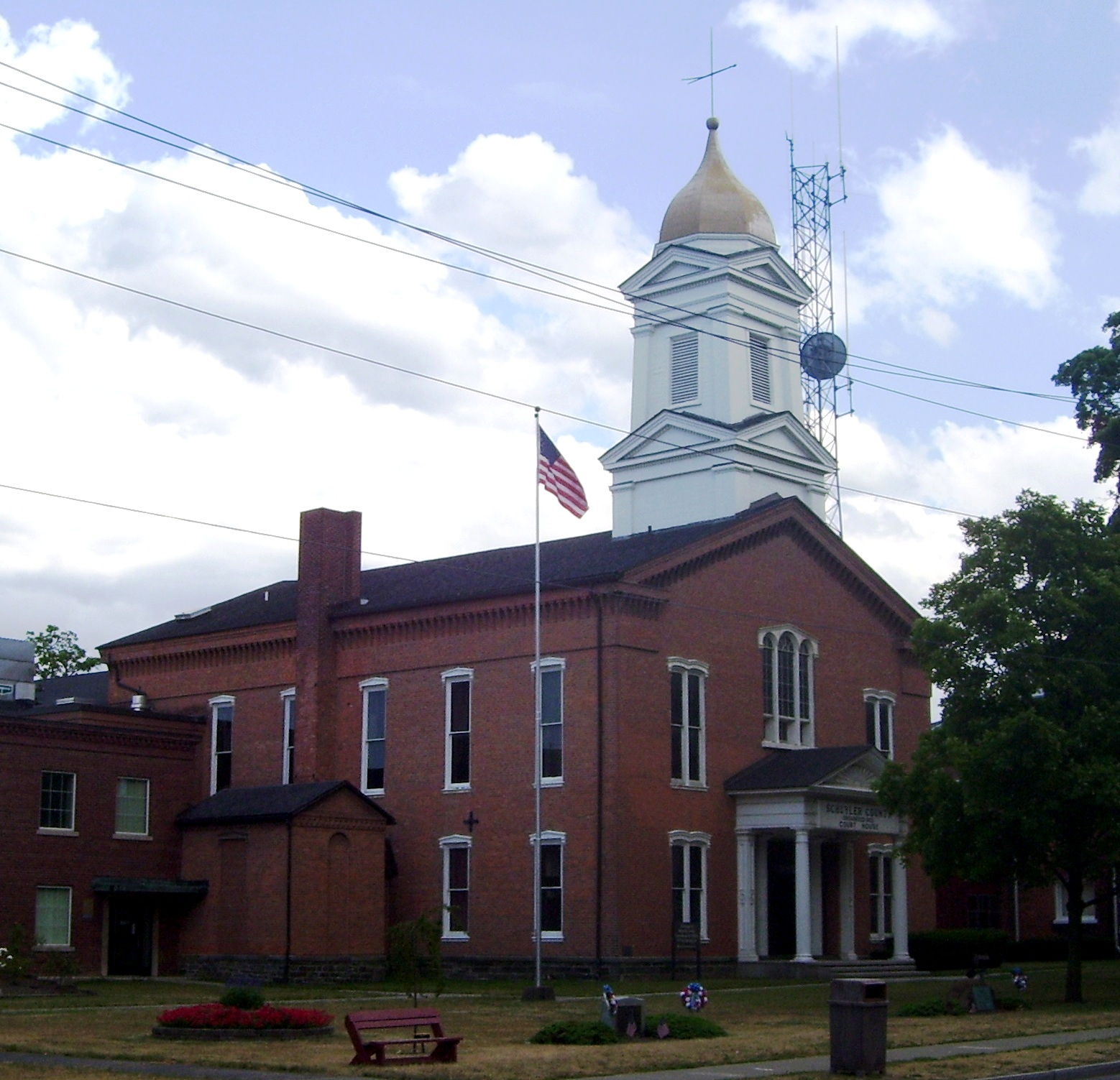
- Schuyler County Courthouse

- Flag Seal

- Location within the U.S. state of New York
- Coordinates: 42°23′N 76°53′W
- Country: United States
- State: New York
- Founded: 1854
- Named for: Philip Schuyler
- Seat: Watkins Glen
- Largest community: Watkins Glen

Area
  - Total: 342 sq mi (890 km^{2})
  - Land: 328 sq mi (850 km^{2})
  - Water: 14 sq mi (36 km^{2}) 4.1%

Population (2020)
  - Total: 17,898
  - Estimate (2025): 16,924 ▼
  - Density: 54.5/sq mi (21.0/km^{2})
- Time zone: UTC−5 (Eastern)
  - Summer (DST): UTC−4 (EDT)
- Congressional districts: 23rd, 24th
- Website: www.schuylercountyny.gov

Schuyler County is a county in the U.S. state of New York. As of the 2020 census, the population was 17,898, making it the second-least populous county in New York. The county seat is the village of Watkins Glen. The name is in honor of General Philip Schuyler, one of the four major generals in the Continental Army in the American Revolutionary War. The county is part of the Southern Tier region of the state.

== History ==
When counties were established in New York State in 1683, the present Schuyler County was part of Albany County. This was an enormous county, including the northern part of New York State as well as all of the present State of Vermont and, in theory, extending westward to the Pacific Ocean. This county was reduced in size on July 3, 1766, by the creation of Cumberland County, and further on March 16, 1770, by the creation of Gloucester County, both containing territory now in Vermont.

On March 12, 1772, what was left of Albany County was split into three parts, one remaining under the name Albany County. One of the other pieces, Tryon County, contained the western portion (and thus, since no western boundary was specified, theoretically still extended west to the Pacific). Tryon County's eastern boundary was approximately five miles west of the present city of Schenectady, and the county included the western part of the Adirondack Mountains and the area west of the West Branch of the Delaware River. The area then designated as Tryon County now includes 37 counties of New York State. The county was named for William Tryon, colonial governor of New York.

In the years prior to 1776, most of the Loyalists in Tryon County fled to Canada. In 1784, following the peace treaty that ended the American Revolutionary War, Tryon County's name was changed to Montgomery County in honor of the general, Richard Montgomery, who had captured several places in Canada and died attempting to capture the city of Quebec, replacing the name of the hated British governor.

In 1789, Ontario County was split off from Montgomery. The actual area split off from Montgomery County was much larger than the present county, also including the present Allegany, Cattaraugus, Chautauqua, Erie, Genesee, Livingston, Monroe, Niagara, Orleans, Steuben, Wyoming, Yates, and part of Schuyler and Wayne counties.

Herkimer and Tioga counties were two of three counties split off from Montgomery County (the other being Otsego County) in 1791.

In 1794, Onondaga County was formed by the splitting of Herkimer County. This county was larger than the present Onondaga County, however, including the present Cayuga, Seneca, and Tompkins counties.

On March 8, 1796, Steuben County was created, split off from Ontario County. It was larger than the present county, however.

In 1798, Chemung County was formed from Tioga County, but the county at that time was rather larger than the present county, containing a portion of what would later become Schuyler County.

In 1799, Cayuga County was formed by the splitting of Onondaga County. This county was, however, much larger than the present Cayuga County. It then included the present Seneca and Tompkins counties, as well as part of what would become Schuyler County.

In 1804, Seneca County was formed by the splitting of Cayuga County. Then in 1817, in turn, a portion of Seneca County was combined with a piece of the remainder of Cayuga County to form Tompkins County.

In 1823, Steuben County was reduced in size by the combination of a portion of the county with a portion of Ontario County to form Yates County.

On April 17, 1854, portions of Steuben, Chemung and Tompkins counties were combined to form Schuyler County.

== Geography ==
According to the U.S. Census Bureau, the county has a total area of 342 square miles (890 km^{2}), of which 328 square miles (850 km^{2}) is land and 14 square miles (36 km^{2}) (4.1%) is water.

Schuyler County is in the western part of New York State, west of Ithaca at the southern end of Seneca Lake.

The Finger Lakes National Forest is in the north part of the county.

=== Adjacent counties ===
- Seneca County - north
- Tompkins County - east
- Chemung County - south
- Steuben County - west
- Yates County - northwest

=== National protected area ===
- Finger Lakes National Forest (part)

== Demographics ==
Historical population
Census	Pop.	Note	%±
1860	18,840		—
1870	18,989		0.8%
1880	18,842		−0.8%
1890	16,711		−11.3%
1900	15,811		−5.4%
1910	14,004		−11.4%
1920	13,098		−6.5%
1930	12,909		−1.4%
1940	12,979		0.5%
1950	14,182		9.3%
1960	15,044		6.1%
1970	16,737		11.3%
1980	17,686		5.7%
1990	18,662		5.5%
2000	19,224		3.0%
2010	18,343		−4.6%
2020	17,898		−2.4%
2025 (est.)	16,924	▼	−5.4%
U.S. Decennial Census; 1790-1960 1900-1990; 1990-2000 2010-2020

|estyear=2023 |estimate=17507 |estref=

=== 2020 census ===
Schuyler County, New York – Racial and ethnic composition Note: the US Census treats Hispanic/Latino as an ethnic category. This table excludes Latinos from the racial categories and assigns them to a separate category. Hispanics/Latinos may be of any race.
Race / Ethnicity (NH = Non-Hispanic)	Pop 1980	Pop 1990	Pop 2000	Pop 2010	Pop 2020	% 1980	% 1990	% 2000	% 2010	% 2020
White alone (NH)	17,461	18,254	18,417	17,646	16,618	98.73%	97.81%	95.80%	96.20%	92.85%
Black or African American alone (NH)	72	148	265	143	91	0.41%	0.79%	1.38%	0.78%	0.51%
Native American or Alaska Native alone (NH)	38	49	70	44	38	0.21%	0.26%	0.36%	0.24%	0.21%
Asian alone (NH)	24	39	55	51	108	0.14%	0.21%	0.29%	0.28%	0.60%
Native Hawaiian or Pacific Islander alone (NH)	x	x	5	4	1	x	x	0.03%	0.02%	0.01%
Other race alone (NH)	22	7	8	10	43	0.12%	0.04%	0.04%	0.05%	0.24%
Mixed race or Multiracial (NH)	x	x	169	211	670	x	x	0.88%	1.15%	3.74%
Hispanic or Latino (any race)	69	165	235	234	329	0.39%	0.88%	1.22%	1.28%	1.84%
Total	17,686	18,662	19,224	18,343	17,898	100.00%	100.00%	100.00%	100.00%	100.00%

=== 2000 census ===
As of the census of 2000, there were 19,224 people, 7,374 households, and 5,191 families residing in the county. The population density was 58 people per square mile (22 people/km^{2}). There were 9,181 housing units at an average density of 28 units per square mile (11/km^{2}). The racial makeup of the county was 96.48% White, 1.45% African American, 0.40% Native American, 0.29% Asian, 0.03% Pacific Islander, 0.36% from other races, and 0.99% from two or more races. Hispanic or Latino of any race were 1.22% of the population. 17.3% were of German, 15.5% English, 13.9% Irish, 11.8% American and 11.4% Italian ancestry according to Census 2000. 97.1% spoke English and 1.1% Spanish as their first language.

There were 7,374 households, out of which 32.30% had children under the age of 18 living with them, 55.70% were married couples living together, 9.70% had a female householder with no husband present, and 29.60% were non-families. 23.60% of all households were made up of individuals, and 10.70% had someone living alone who was 65 years of age or older. The average household size was 2.52 and the average family size was 2.96.

In the county, the population was spread out, with 25.30% under the age of 18, 7.90% from 18 to 24, 26.60% from 25 to 44, 25.40% from 45 to 64, and 14.60% who were 65 years of age or older. The median age was 39 years. For every 100 females there were 100.50 males. For every 100 females age 18 and over, there were 96.60 males.

The median income for a household in the county was $36,010, and the median income for a family was $41,441. Males had a median income of $31,549 versus $21,928 for females. The per capita income for the county was $17,039. About 8.80% of families and 11.80% of the population were below the poverty line, including 17.10% of those under age 18 and 6.20% of those age 65 or over.

== Transportation ==
Schuyler County has eight private airstrips and its nearest major airport is Elmira Corning Regional Airport. Schuyler County Transit provides bus service. The county's Highway Department is headquartered in Watkins Glen and is charged with maintaining roads, including:

- Overseeing road construction and repair
- Issuing hauling and road construction permits
- Removing snow and ice

Each town and village within Schuyler County maintains its own highway department.

=== Major roadways ===
- New York State Route 13
- New York State Route 14
- New York State Route 14A
- New York State Route 79
- New York State Route 224
- New York State Route 226
- New York State Route 227
- New York State Route 228
- New York State Route 230
- New York State Route 329
- New York State Route 409
- New York State Route 414
- List of county routes in Schuyler County, New York

The former Chemung Canal was partially located in Schuyler County. The former New York State Route 419 and New York State Route 962C were located in Schuyler County.

== Communities ==
=== Larger Settlements ===
All larger settlements are villages

#	Location	Population
1	†Watkins Glen	1,859
2	Montour Falls	1,711
3	Odessa	591
4	Burdett	357

† - County Seat

=== Towns ===
- Catharine
- Cayuta
- Dix
- Hector
- Montour
- Orange
- Reading
- Tyrone

=== Villages ===
- Burdett
- Montour Falls
- Odessa
- Watkins Glen (county seat)

=== Hamlets ===
- Mecklenburg
- Perry City
- Valois

== Politics ==
United States presidential election results for Schuyler County, New York
Year	Republican		Democratic		Third party(ies)	
Year	No.	%	No.	%	No.	%
1856	2,542	63.81%	981	24.62%	461	11.57%
1860	2,551	59.90%	1,708	40.10%	0	0.00%
1864	2,576	57.64%	1,893	42.36%	0	0.00%
1868	2,771	57.60%	2,040	42.40%	0	0.00%
1872	2,478	54.96%	1,996	44.27%	35	0.78%
1876	2,860	54.34%	2,255	42.85%	148	2.81%
1880	2,790	53.35%	2,293	43.84%	147	2.81%
1884	2,616	53.17%	2,039	41.44%	265	5.39%
1888	2,704	55.16%	1,975	40.29%	223	4.55%
1892	2,410	55.39%	1,486	34.15%	455	10.46%
1896	2,692	59.89%	1,619	36.02%	184	4.09%
1900	2,598	55.45%	1,889	40.32%	198	4.23%
1904	2,570	58.78%	1,621	37.08%	181	4.14%
1908	2,417	56.60%	1,695	39.70%	158	3.70%
1912	1,649	43.26%	1,416	37.15%	747	19.60%
1916	1,956	52.38%	1,629	43.63%	149	3.99%
1920	3,827	71.29%	1,231	22.93%	310	5.77%
1924	4,301	70.81%	1,555	25.60%	218	3.59%
1928	4,749	72.10%	1,731	26.28%	107	1.62%
1932	4,491	65.27%	2,255	32.77%	135	1.96%
1936	4,819	64.64%	2,551	34.22%	85	1.14%
1940	4,936	68.83%	2,211	30.83%	24	0.33%
1944	4,506	71.76%	1,767	28.14%	6	0.10%
1948	4,452	69.23%	1,868	29.05%	111	1.73%
1952	5,604	75.68%	1,784	24.09%	17	0.23%
1956	5,795	78.23%	1,613	21.77%	0	0.00%
1960	5,201	69.10%	2,315	30.76%	11	0.15%
1964	2,925	40.31%	4,326	59.62%	5	0.07%
1968	4,105	61.31%	2,034	30.38%	557	8.32%
1972	4,945	71.76%	1,937	28.11%	9	0.13%
1976	4,267	59.35%	2,885	40.13%	37	0.51%
1980	3,838	55.17%	2,514	36.14%	605	8.70%
1984	5,207	67.98%	2,422	31.62%	31	0.40%
1988	4,291	59.25%	2,900	40.04%	51	0.70%
1992	3,226	39.35%	2,859	34.87%	2,114	25.78%
1996	3,134	41.05%	3,303	43.26%	1,198	15.69%
2000	4,381	53.73%	3,301	40.49%	471	5.78%
2004	4,960	57.74%	3,445	40.10%	185	2.15%
2008	4,542	52.81%	3,933	45.73%	125	1.45%
2012	4,281	52.55%	3,674	45.10%	191	2.34%
2016	5,050	57.57%	3,091	35.24%	631	7.19%
2020	5,621	57.56%	3,903	39.97%	242	2.48%
2024	5,717	59.98%	3,736	39.19%	79	0.83%

Schuyler County is strongly Republican, having backed the Republican presidential candidate in all but two elections since the Civil War, with 1964 and 1996 being the sole exceptions.

Gubernatorial elections results

Gubernatorial elections results
Year	Republican	Democratic	Third parties
2022	65.47% 5,092	34.21% 2,661	0.32% 25
2018	54.52% 4,024	32.71% 2,414	12.77% 942
2014	61.19% 3,660	31.6% 1,890	7.21% 431
2010	47.52% 2,829	49.08% 2,922	3.4% 202
2006	42.28% 2,514	55.79% 3,317	1.93% 115
2002	60.93% 3,535	17.98% 1,043	21.1% 1,224

== See also ==
- List of counties in New York
- National Register of Historic Places listings in Schuyler County, New York
