= Finger Lakes National Forest =

Landmark in New York, United States

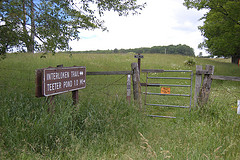
- Trailhead for the Interloken Trail, running through pastureland in the Finger Lakes National Forest

- Location within the United States
- Location: New York, United States
- Nearest city: Ithaca, New York
- Coordinates: 42°30′38″N 76°47′23″W
- Area: 16,259 acres (65.80 km^{2})
- Established: 1985
- Governing body: U.S. Forest Service
- Website: Green Mountain & Finger Lakes National Forests

The Finger Lakes National Forest is a United States National Forest that encompasses 16,259 acres (65.80 km^{2}) of Seneca and Schuyler counties, nestled between Seneca Lake and Cayuga Lake in the Finger Lakes Region of the State of New York. It has over 30 miles (50 km) of interconnecting trails that traverse gorges, ravines, pastures, and woodlands.

Although about 3.2 million acres (1300 km^{2}) of the State of New York is in the State Forest Preserve, Wildlife Management Areas, and Forests, there are few large areas of public land in the Finger Lakes Region. The Finger Lakes National Forest is the only National Forest in New York and the only public land that has had an explicit philosophy of multiple use.

== Early history ==
The area around the Finger Lakes National Forest was originally inhabited by the Haudenosaunee. Information of their use of the area within the current forest boundary is lacking. It is thought that at least some hunting activity occurred. This area was a forested hunting territory for the Haudenosaunee people 250 years ago. Just 100 years ago, it was nearly treeless, the result of logging, farming, and grazing practices by Euro-American settlers. Today it is a mix of second growth woodland, pasture and lots which are in a transition from pasture-to-woodland. The cellar holes, stone walls, artifacts, and other material evidence of the former residents of this area are an unwritten reminder and historical record of their lives. They are protected by Federal Law. There are a number of archaeological sites on lands managed by the Finger Lakes National Forest, most from the post-Revolutionary period.

Prior to the European "rediscovery" of eastern North America, Native Americans lived in this part of New York for more than 10,000 years. The Haudenosaunee are the last in a series of Native American cultures to have lived here, and two of the Six Nations homelands border the Forest. The lakes around which much Haudenosaunee life took place now bear their names: Cayuga and Seneca. The lack of reliable water sources and lime-rich soils (good for corn agriculture) precluded development of large year-round Haudenosaunee villages within the Forest's present-day boundaries, but the original forest cover of pines and hardwoods (such as hickory, elm, beech, chestnut, oak, and maple) would have made this a good hunting and nut-gathering territory for these people.

== American Revolution ==
Because of the Haudenosaunee alliance with the British during the American Revolution, George Washington assigned Generals Sullivan and Clinton to mount a campaign against them. The Sullivan Campaign of 1779 was a major military undertaking which destroyed more than 40 villages and laid to waste hundreds of acres of cultivated fields and a large portion of the stored food and materials the Haudenosaunee and British were dependent upon.

A secondary, non-military result of the neutralization of the Six Nations in this region was that it created "new" lands to allot to Colonial soldiers after the war in partial payment or reward for their service. The land was divided up into "military lots", the one mile (1.6 km) square (2.6 km^{2}) units that are still the basis for the road (and much of the trail) system present on the Finger Lakes National Forest today. In 1790, the area was divided into 600 acre (2.4 km^{2}) military lots and distributed among Revolutionary War veterans as payment for their services. These early settlers cleared the land for production of hay and small grains such as buckwheat. As New York City grew, a strong market for these products developed, encouraging more intensive agriculture. The farmers prospered until the mid-19th century, when a series of unfortunate events occurred - the popularity of motorized transportation in urban centers (reducing the number of horses to be fed), gradual depletion of the soil resource, and competition from the midwest.

== Federal purchase of the land ==
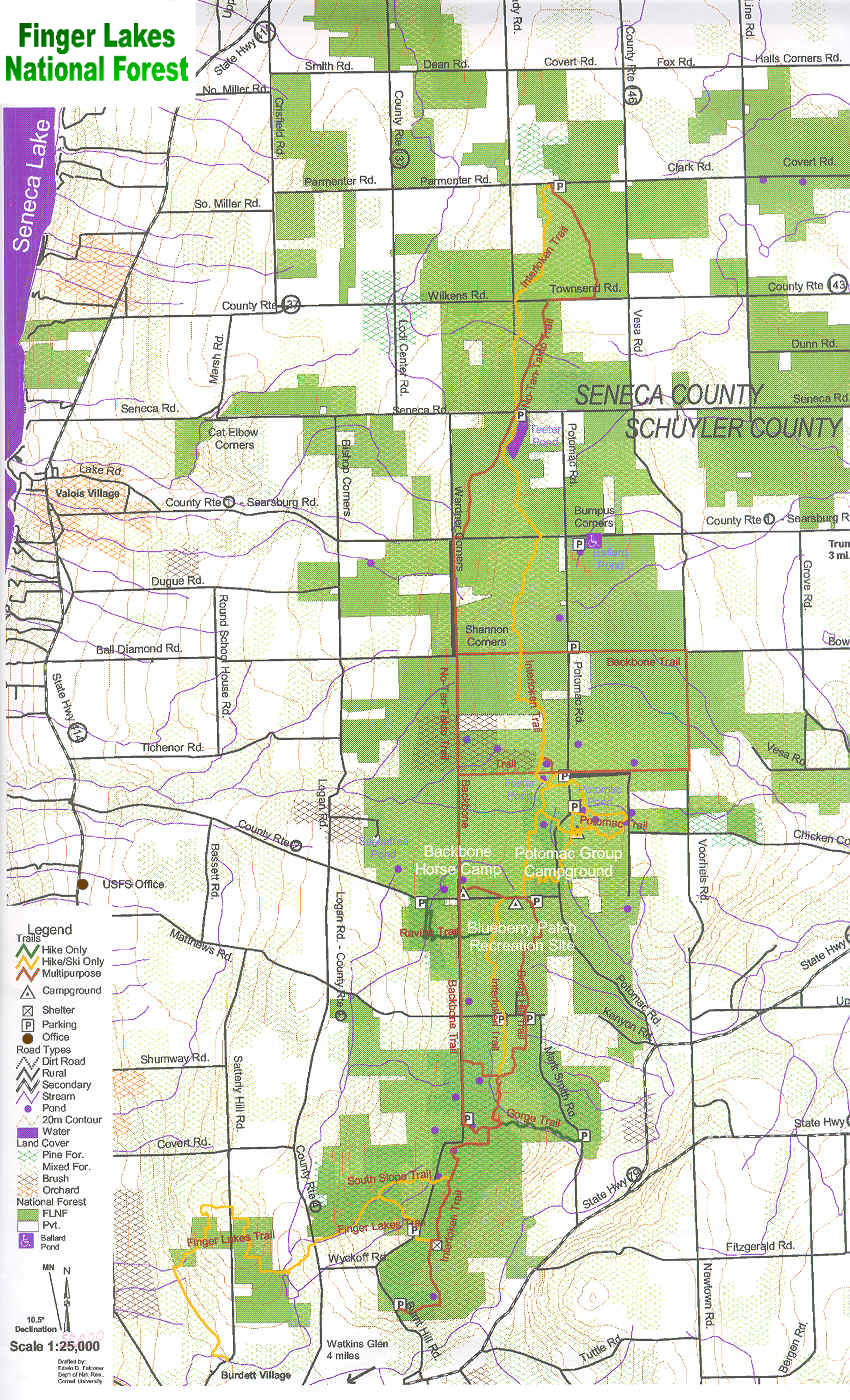
Map of the Finger Lakes National Forest

Between 1890 and the Great Depression, over 1 million acres (4000 km^{2}) of farmland was abandoned in south central New York State. In the 1930s it was recognized that farmers in many parts of the country could no longer make a living from their exhausted land. Environmental damage was occurring as they cultivated the land more and more intensively to make ends meet. Several pieces of legislation were passed, including the Federal Emergency Relief Act of 1933, and the Bankhead-Jones Farm Tenant Act of 1937 to address these problems. One result was the formation of a government agency, the Resettlement Administration, to carry out the new laws. This agency directed the relocation of farmers to better land or different jobs, and the purchase of marginal farmland by the Federal government. Between 1938 and 1941, over 100 farms were purchased in the area now in the National Forest. Because this was done on a willing-seller, willing-buyer basis, the resulting Federal ownership resembled a patchwork quilt. This was especially true in the Seneca County end of the Forest, where soils were more productive, and some families elected to stay. This ownership pattern still exists today.

The newly acquired Federal land, named the Hector Land Use Area (LUA), was initially managed by the Soil Conservation Service. The emphasis was on stabilization of the soil by planting conifers, and development of a grazing program. Previously cultivated fields were converted to improved pastures to demonstrate how less intensive agriculture could still make productive use of the land. In 1943, the Hector Cooperative Grazing Association was formed. This organization was issued a long term lease to manage grazing on the (LUA). They coordinated use of the pastures by as many as 120 individual livestock owners within a 100-mile (160 km) radius of the (LUA).

In 1996, the property associated with the former Camp Fossenvue was added to the forest. On that property is the Queen's Castle, a structure listed on the National Register of Historic Places in 1999.

== Creation of the national forest ==
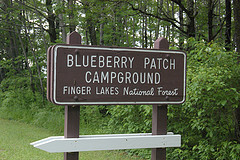
Entrance sign for Blueberry Patch Campground in the Finger Lakes National Forest

By the 1950s, many of the original objectives of the Hector (LUA) had been met. Farmers had been resettled, the eroding soil stabilized, and alternative agriculture uses demonstrated. At the same time, the public was becoming interested in the concept of multiple uses of public land. Management and appropriate ownership of the Hector LUA was reevaluated. The decision was made in 1954 to transfer administrative responsibilities to the U.S. Forest Service, which already had a fairly long history of multiple use management. Initially this was carried out by the Regional Office in Upper Darby Township, Pennsylvania. When this region was later consolidated within the Forest Service's Northeast Region, Hector became an administrative unit of the Green Mountain National Forest in Vermont.

In 1982, the Federal land management agencies were directed to identify isolated parcels of federal land that could be sold without significantly affecting the resource base or public service. The intent was to dispose of lands that were inefficient to manage, and to generate revenue. The Hector Land Use Area was one parcel studied for possible disposal under this "Assets Management" program. When public meetings were held to evaluate this idea, there was strong local support for continued federal ownership. Local and regional citizens had come to depend on Hector for wood products, forage, recreation, and other benefits. Because of this public support, Congress enacted legislation to make it a permanent part of the National Forest System. The Hector Ranger District, Green Mountain National Forest, had been created. Local citizens asked the Forest Service to change the name to Hector Ranger District, Finger Lakes National Forest, so it would be less confusing to visitors, and promote local pride about the area. This change was made in October 1985.

== Today ==
The national forest is a public use resource in both Seneca County and Schuyler County, lying between Cayuga Lake and Seneca Lake. The Finger Lakes National Forest is an administrative unit of the Green Mountain National Forest. Both are managed by the Forest Service from offices in Rutland, Vermont. The Forest has continued the management mix of pasture, forest, recreation and wildlife and includes the preservation of historic and archaeological sites. It is the second-smallest National Forest in the United States, larger only than the Tuskegee National Forest in Alabama.

== See also ==
- List of national forests of the United States
