= New York State Route 409 =

State highway in Schuyler County, New York, US

New York State Route 409
- Map of Schuyler County in central New York with NY 409 highlighted in red

Route information
- Maintained by NYSDOT
- Length: 1.65 mi (2.66 km)
- Existed: by 1970–present

Major junctions
- West end: Station Road at Norfolk Southern grade crossing in Dix
- East end: NY 14 / NY 414 in Watkins Glen

Location
- Country: United States
- State: New York
- Counties: Schuyler

Highway system
- New York Highways; Interstate; US; State; Reference; Parkways
← NY 408	→ NY 410

New York State Route 409 (NY 409) is a 1.65-mile-long (2.66 km) state highway in Schuyler County, New York, in the United States. It is more of a spur route as it is connected to the state highway system at only one end. It begins as a continuation of Station Road at a grade crossing with the Norfolk Southern Railway in the town of Dix and ends in downtown Watkins Glen at a junction with NY 14 and NY 414. Its western terminus is also the upper entrance to the gorge at Watkins Glen State Park. NY 409 is known as Station Road in Dix and as Steuben Street and West 4th Street in Watkins Glen. The route was assigned by 1970 and follows part of the original Watkins Glen Grand Prix Course.

== Route description ==
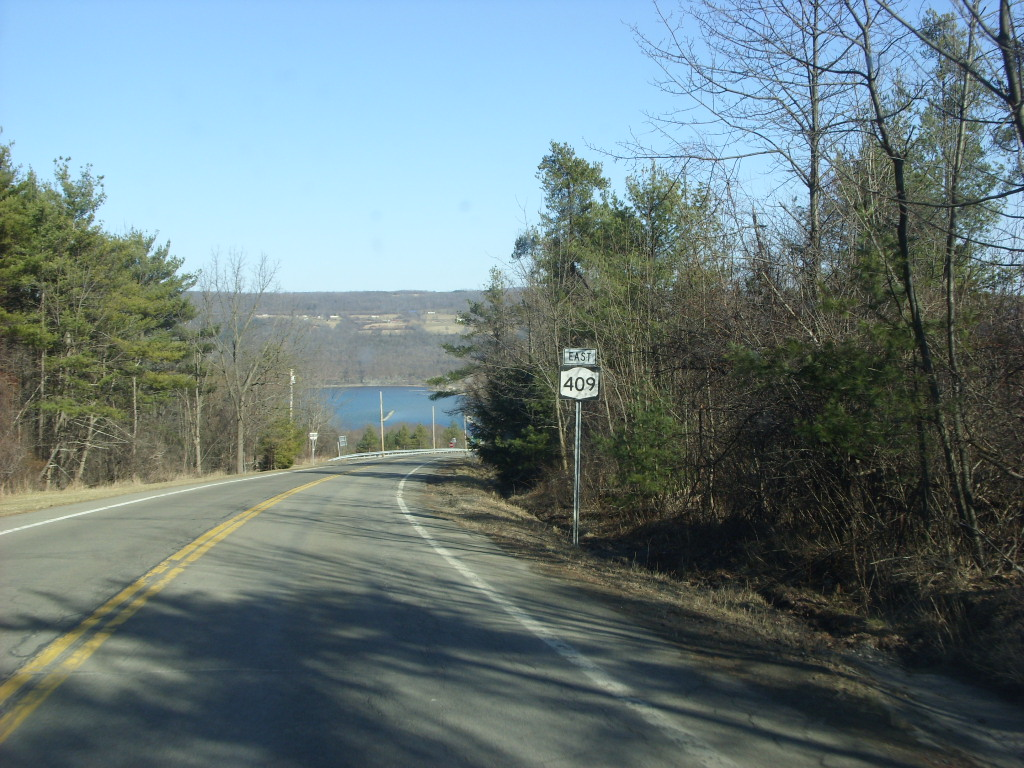
NY 409 heading eastbound towards the junction with CR 28. Seneca Lake is visible in the background

NY 409 begins at a grade crossing with the Norfolk Southern Railway in the town of Dix, where maintenance of Station Road shifts from Dix to the New York State Department of Transportation. The route initially heads to the northeast through an isolated rural area, running along the northern fringe of Watkins Glen State Park to the western edge of a valley overlooking Seneca Lake and the village of Watkins Glen. Here, NY 409 turns northward, slowly descending into the gorge as it crosses into the town of Reading. After 0.5 miles (0.8 km), the route curves back to the east and rapidly descends in elevation on its way into the village of Watkins Glen.

Now named Steuben Street, NY 409 first meets the southern terminus of County Route 28 (CR 28), which links Watkins Glen to Hammondsport by way of CR 23. The route continues on, proceeding southeastward across residential sections of the village, bisecting several blocks of homes in the process. The route continues downhill into Watkins Glen's business district, where Steuben Street turns northeastward and becomes West 4th Street at South Madison Avenue, a north–south street serving as a divider between the village's residential and commercial districts. NY 409 ends one block later at an intersection with Franklin Street, which carries NY 14 and NY 414 through Watkins Glen. At this point, NY 414 leaves NY 14 and continues to the northeast along NY 409's right-of-way on East 4th Street.

== History ==
From 1948 to 1952, modern NY 409 was part of the Watkins Glen Grand Prix Course, a road course around Watkins Glen State Park that also included NY 329, Franklin Street (NY 14 and NY 414), and Whites Hollow Road. The first race on the road took place on October 2, 1948; the last was on September 20, 1952. During the 1952 race, a car briefly entered the crowd that had lined up along the course, killing one person and injuring several others. The race was stopped immediately and moved to another, more rural location in 1953. The entirety of the old Grand Prix road course was added to the National Register of Historic Places on December 4, 2002. NY 409, meanwhile, was assigned to its current alignment by 1970.

== Major intersections ==
The entire route is in Schuyler County.

Location	mi	km	Destinations	Notes
Dix	0.00	0.00	Station Road	Western terminus; continues as Station Road at Norfolk Southern grade crossing
Watkins Glen	1.65	2.66	NY 14 / NY 414 south (Franklin Street) – Watkins Glen State Park	Eastern terminus
Watkins Glen	1.65	2.66	NY 414 north (East 4th Street)	Continuation past NY 14
1.000 mi = 1.609 km; 1.000 km = 0.621 mi
