= New York State Route 329 =

State highway in Schuyler County, New York, US

New York State Route 329
- Map of the Watkins Glen area with NY 329 highlighted in red and NY 419 highlighted in blue

Route information
- Maintained by NYSDOT
- Length: 2.57 mi (4.14 km)
- Existed: 1930–present

Major junctions
- West end: Meads Hill Road in Dix
- East end: NY 14 / NY 414 in Watkins Glen

Location
- Country: United States
- State: New York
- Counties: Schuyler

Highway system
- New York Highways; Interstate; US; State; Reference; Parkways
← NY 328	→ NY 330
← NY 418	NY 419	→ NY 420

New York State Route 329 (NY 329) is a 2.57-mile-long (4.14 km) state highway near Watkins Glen, New York, in the United States. The western terminus is at an intersection with Meads Hill Road in Dix. The eastern terminus is at a junction with NY 14 and NY 414 in Watkins Glen. NY 329 passes south of Watkins Glen State Park while New York State Route 419, a highway 0.30 miles (0.48 km) in length, connects NY 329 to the park. Both NY 329 and NY 419 pass through sparsely populated, rural areas.

NY 329 was assigned as part of the 1930 renumbering of state highways in New York while NY 419 was in place by 1970. NY 329 originally extended as far west as the hamlet of Townsend; however, it was cut back to its current length in the 1960s. From 1948 to 1952, NY 329 was part of the Watkins Glen Grand Prix Course, a road course around Watkins Glen State Park. Prior to the creation of the modern New York state route system in 1924, the routing of NY 329 was designated, but not signed, as part of legislative Route 46 from 1911 to 1921.

== Route description ==
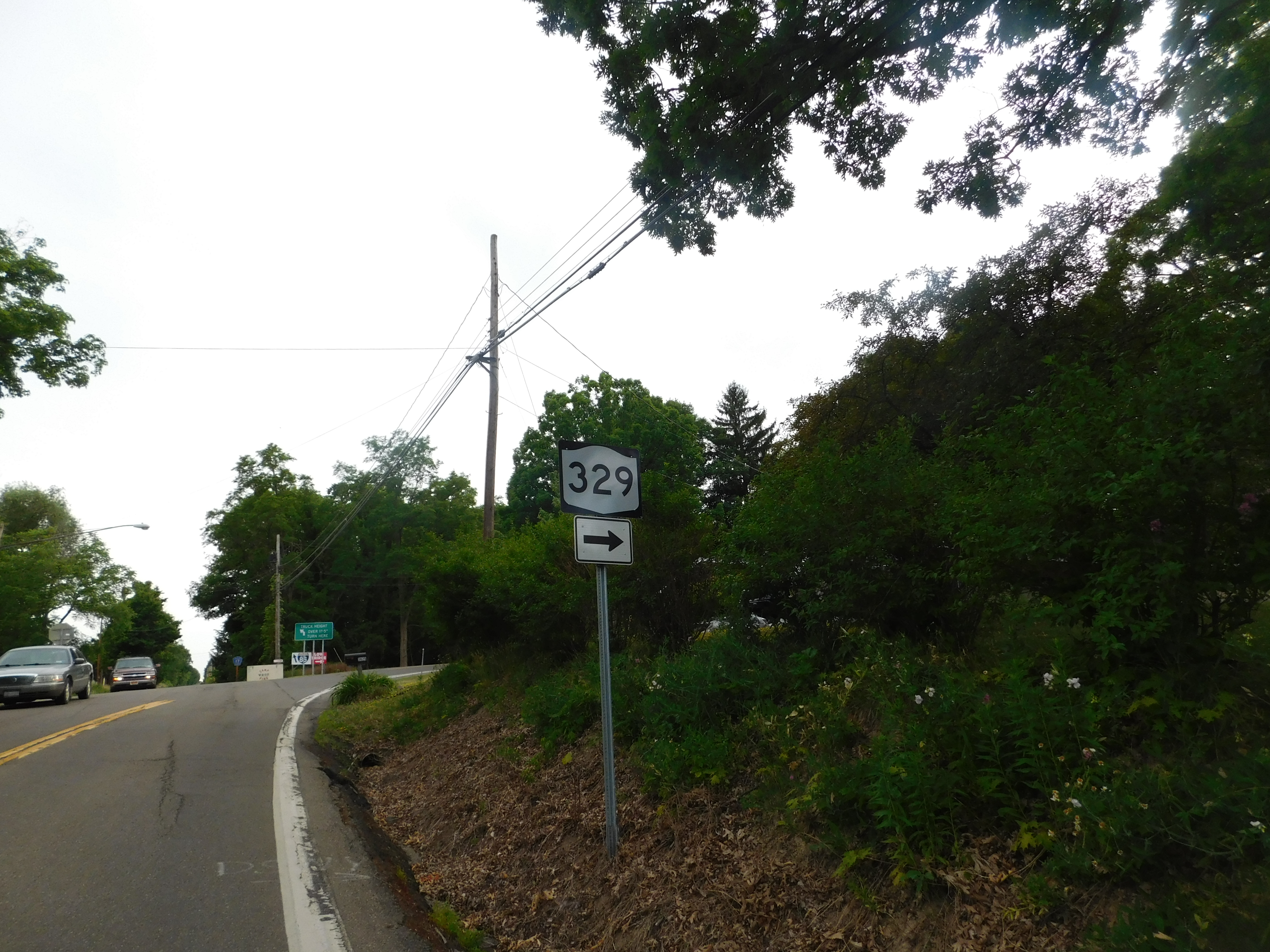
NY 329 through Watkins Glen

=== NY 329 ===
The state-maintained NY 329 begins at an intersection with locally maintained Meads Hill Road, Townsend Road and Whites Hollow Road in the community of Dix, New York. NY 329 progresses eastward, passing through a mix of forestry and residential homes, intersecting with Willow Drive, a local cul-de-sac, crossing a local railroad line and entering Watkins Glen State Park. There, the highway becomes further surrounded by residences, soon turning to the northeast, leaving the residential area for forestry and fields. However, as it approaches the intersection with County Route 17, NY 329 returns to the residences and intersects with NY 419 just southeast of the Watkins Glen municipal limits. After, NY 329 turns northward, paralleling NY 414 into Watkins Glen, and after a short stretch of woodlands, the route turns eastward, terminating at an intersection with NY 14 and NY 414 (Franklin Street).

=== NY 419 ===
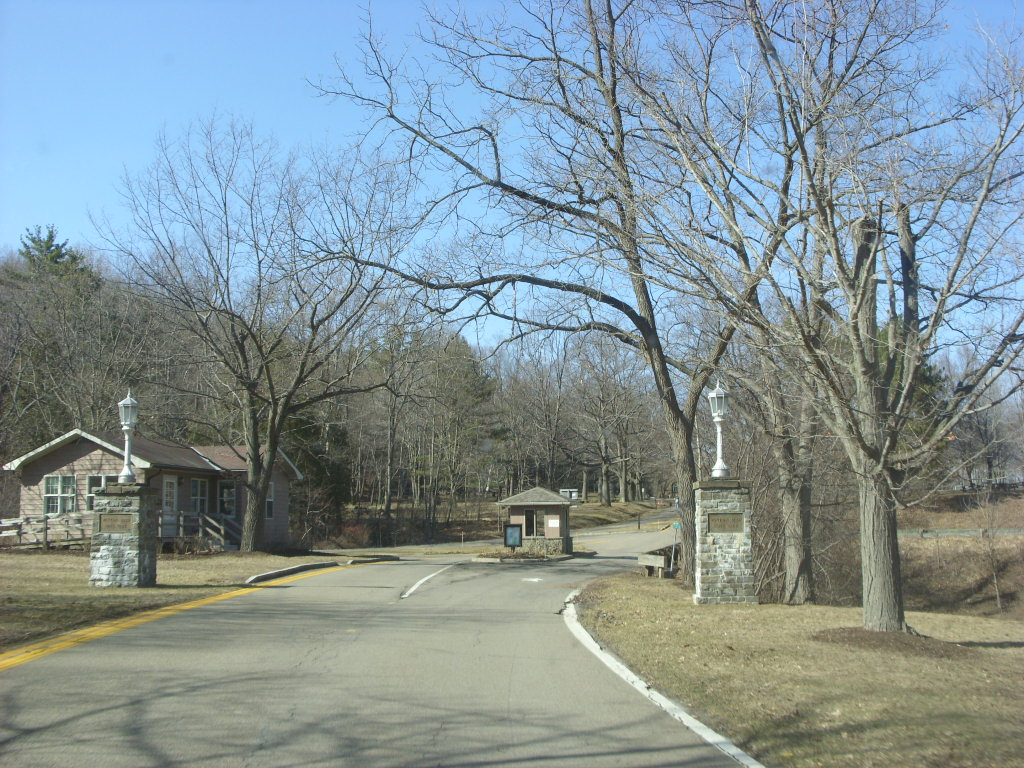
NY 419 at its northern terminus, the tollbooth entrance to Watkins Glen State Park

NY 419 begins at NY 329 just southwest of the Watkins Glen village limits. It heads west along the southern edge of Watkins Glen State Park for 250 yards (230 m) as Walnut Road, then curves northward toward the park. The route, a mere 0.39 miles (0.63 km) long, comes to an end at the southern entrance to the park.

== History ==
In 1911, the New York State Legislature created Route 46, an unsigned legislative route that extended from Coopers Plains (northwest of Corning) in the southwest to Trumansburg in the northeast via Watkins Glen. On July 24, 1915, the state let a contract for a project to improve a 6.03-mile (9.70 km) portion of Route 46 in the town of Dix and the village of Watkins (now Watkins Glen) to state highway standards. This segment of Route 46, internally inventoried as State Highway 5557 (SH 5557), began at the western town line of Dix and followed Townsend Road and modern NY 329 east to Watkins, where it ended at legislative Route 12 (modern NY 14 and NY 414). The project was 13 percent complete by 1920 and completed as far west as the hamlet of Townsend by 1929. On March 1, 1921, the Route 46 designation was reassigned elsewhere in the state as part of a partial renumbering of New York's legislative routes.

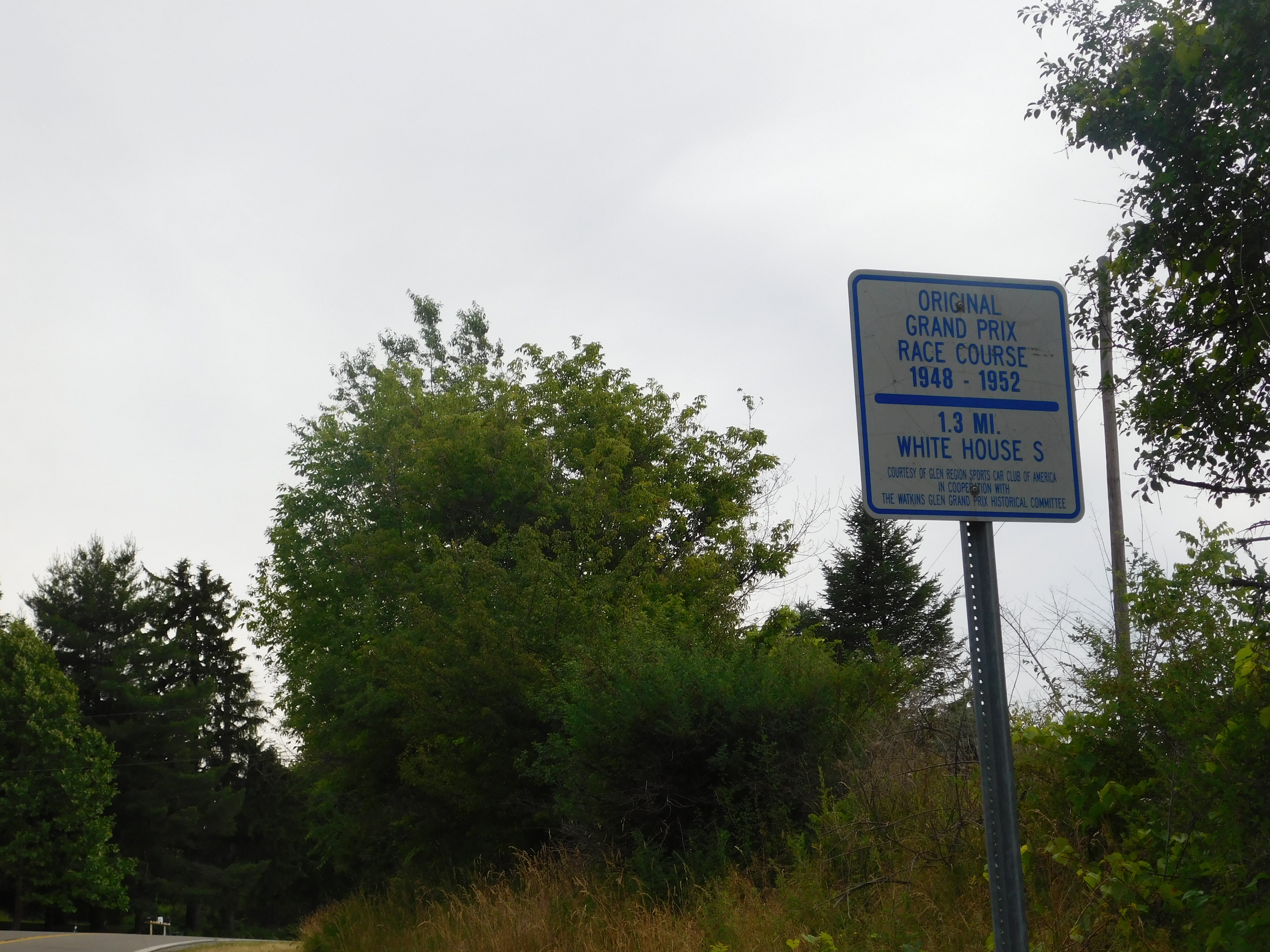
Signage along NY 329 for the former Watkins Glen Road Course

When the first set of posted routes in New York were assigned in 1924, no designation was given to SH 5557. In the 1930 renumbering of state highways in New York, several of the routes assigned during the 1920s were renumbered or modified. At the same time, hundreds of state-maintained highways that did not yet have a route number were assigned one. One of these was SH 5557, which was designated as NY 329. NY 329 was truncated to its current western terminus at Meads Hill Road in the 1960s. A connection from NY 329 to Watkins Glen State Park was designated as NY 419 by 1970.

From 1948 to 1952, NY 329 was part of the Watkins Glen Grand Prix Course, a road course around Watkins Glen State Park that also included NY 409, Franklin Street (NY 14 and NY 414), and Whites Hollow Road. The first race on the road took place on October 2, 1948; the last was on September 20, 1952. During the 1952 race, a car briefly entered the crowd that had lined up along the course, killing one person and injuring several others. The race was stopped immediately and moved to another, more rural location in 1953. The entirety of the old Grand Prix road course was added to the National Register of Historic Places on December 4, 2002.

== Major intersections ==
NY 329

The entire route is in Schuyler County.

Location	mi	km	Destinations	Notes
Dix	0.00	0.00	Meads Hill Road	Western terminus
Watkins Glen	2.16	3.48	NY 419 north	Southern terminus of NY 419
Watkins Glen	2.57	4.14	NY 14 / NY 414 (Franklin Street)	Eastern terminus
1.000 mi = 1.609 km; 1.000 km = 0.621 mi

NY 419

The entire route is in Watkins Glen, Schuyler County.

mi	km	Destinations	Notes
0.00	0.00	NY 329	Southern terminus
0.39	0.63	Watkins Glen State Park south entrance	Northern terminus
1.000 mi = 1.609 km; 1.000 km = 0.621 mi
