= Dix, New York =

- Town
- Location within the state of New York
- Coordinates: 42°20′13.20″N 76°54′31.70″W
- Country: United States
- State: New York
- County: Schuyler

Area
  - Total: 36.71 sq mi (95.08 km^{2})
  - Land: 36.26 sq mi (93.91 km^{2})
  - Water: 0.46 sq mi (1.18 km^{2})
- Elevation: 1,424 ft (434 m)

Population (2020)
  - Total: 3,723 ▼
  - Estimate (2021): 3,694
  - Density: 108.0/sq mi (41.68/km^{2})
- Time zone: UTC-5 (Eastern (EST))
  - Summer (DST): UTC-4 (EDT)
- FIPS code: 36-20676
- GNIS feature ID: 0978905
- Website: http://www.townofdix.com/

Dix is a town in Schuyler County, New York, United States. The population was 3,723 at the 2020 census.

The Town of Dix is located on the southern border of the county and is north of Elmira.

== History ==
Dix was formed on April 17, 1835, from the Town of Catlin (Chemung County) before the formation of Schuyler County. It was named for the Hon. John A. Dix. The Chemung Canal was completed in 1833 and connected the south end of Seneca Lake to the Chemung River. The path of the canal was the Catharine Creek Valley, running along the eastern part of Dix. The Cayuga-Seneca Canal at the north end of the lake connected the system to the Erie Canal.

In 1842, what is now the village of Watkins Glen was incorporated and set off from the town as "Jefferson."

== Geography ==
According to the United States Census Bureau, the town has a total area of 36.6 square miles (95 km^{2}), of which 36.2 square miles (94 km^{2}) is land and 0.5 square miles (1.3 km^{2}) (1.28%) is water.

Seneca Lake (one of the Finger Lakes) is at the northern border and the southern town line border is the border of Chemung County.

New York State Route 14 joins New York State Route 79 and New York State Route 414 by Watkins Glen. NY-14 is one of the principal streets in Watkins Glen village. New York State Route 329 and New York State Route 419 lead into Watkins Glen village from the west.

== Demographics ==
Historical population
Census	Pop.	Note	%±
1840	1,990		—
1850	2,953		48.4%
1860	2,908		−1.5%
1870	4,282		47.2%
1880	4,168		−2.7%
1890	3,700		−11.2%
1900	3,894		5.2%
1910	3,625		−6.9%
1920	3,486		−3.8%
1930	3,583		2.8%
1940	3,739		4.4%
1950	3,871		3.5%
1960	3,916		1.2%
1970	4,201		7.3%
1980	4,138		−1.5%
1990	4,130		−0.2%
2000	4,197		1.6%
2010	3,864		−7.9%
2020	3,723		−3.6%
2021 (est.)	3,694		−0.8%
U.S. Decennial Census

As of the census of 2000, there were 4,197 people, 1,643 households, and 1,071 families residing in the town. The population density was 116.1 inhabitants per square mile (44.8/km^{2}). There were 1,797 housing units at an average density of 49.7 per square mile (19.2/km^{2}). The racial makeup of the town was 97.31% White, 0.52% African American, 0.55% Native American, 0.57% Asian, 0.02% Pacific Islander, 0.29% from other races, and 0.74% from two or more races. Hispanic or Latino of any race were 1.10% of the population.

There were 1,643 households, out of which 32.4% had children under the age of 18 living with them, 48.8% were married couples living together, 11.0% had a female householder with no husband present, and 34.8% were non-families. 29.0% of all households were made up of individuals, and 12.9% had someone living alone who was 65 years of age or older. The average household size was 2.45 and the average family size was 2.99.

In the town, the population was spread out, with 25.1% under the age of 18, 7.3% from 18 to 24, 26.3% from 25 to 44, 24.2% from 45 to 64, and 17.2% who were 65 years of age or older. The median age was 39 years. For every 100 females, there were 90.9 males. For every 100 females age 18 and over, there were 87.9 males.

The median income for a household in the town was $33,081, and the median income for a family was $40,669. Males had a median income of $31,633 versus $21,051 for females. The per capita income for the town was $16,682. About 8.9% of families and 12.7% of the population were below the poverty line, including 15.3% of those under age 18 and 7.2% of those age 65 or over.

== Communities and locations in the Town of Dix ==
- Beaver Dams – A hamlet in the southwestern corner of the town on NY-414. The Coon Family Log Cabin was listed on the National Register of Historic Places in 2015.
- Glen Creek – A stream that flows through Watkins Glen gorge and Watkins Glen village.
- Montour Falls – A small part of the Village of Montour Falls, located on NY-14.
- Moreland – A hamlet in the south of the town.
- Moreland Station – A location south of Moreland.
- North Beaver Dams – A location north of Beaver Dams on County Road 19.
- Townsend – A hamlet by the western town line on County Road 16.
- Townsend Creek – A stream flowing into Glen Creek in the state park.
- Watkins Glen (originally "Jefferson") – The western part of the Village of Watkins Glen.
- Watkins Glen International – A motor race track southwest of Watkins Glen, which has hosted Formula One and NASCAR Cup Series races.
- Watkins Glen State Park – A state park west of the Village of Watkins Glen.
- Wedgewood – A hamlet in the eastern part of the town.
