= New York State Route 414 =

North–south state highway in New York

New York State Route 414
- Map of the Finger Lakes region with NY 414 highlighted in red

Route information
- Maintained by NYSDOT
- Length: 83.20 mi (133.90 km)
- Existed: c. 1935–present

Major junctions
- South end: NY 352 in Corning
- NY 14 in Watkins Glen; I-90 Toll / New York Thruway near Seneca Falls; NY 31 in Clyde
- North end: NY 104 in Huron

Location
- Country: United States
- State: New York
- Counties: Steuben, Chemung, Schuyler, Seneca, Wayne

Highway system
- New York Highways; Interstate; US; State; Reference; Parkways
← NY 413	→ NY 415
← NY 89	NY 89A	→ I-90

New York State Route 414 (NY 414) is a north–south state highway in the Southern Tier and Finger Lakes regions of New York in the United States. It extends for 83.20 miles (133.90 km) from an intersection with NY 352 in the Steuben County city of Corning to a junction with NY 104 in the Wayne County town of Huron. NY 414 spans five counties and roughly parallels NY 14 between Watkins Glen and Huron. It intersects every major east–west arterial in western New York, including the Southern Tier Expressway (Interstate 86 (I-86) and NY 17), U.S. Route 20 (US 20) and NY 5, and the New York State Thruway (I-90). The route passes through mostly rural areas as it travels between the several villages and cities along its routing.

In the 1930 renumbering of state highways in New York, the portion of modern NY 414 south of Seneca Falls was designated as part of New York State Route 44, a route extending from Caton to Wolcott, while most of what is now NY 414 north of Seneca Falls became part of NY 89. NY 44 was renumbered to NY 414 c. 1935 to eliminate numerical duplication with US 44. NY 414 was shifted onto its current alignment between Seneca Falls and Huron on April 30, 1959, placing it on what had been NY 89 north of the hamlet of Magee and New York State Route 89A between Magee and the overlapped routes of US 20 and NY 5.

== Route description ==
=== Steuben and Chemung counties ===
NY 414 begins at an intersection with NY 352 (Denison Parkway) in the Steuben County city of Corning. It initially heads north on Cedar Street, following it past two largely commercial blocks that make up part of the Market Street Historic District. Past the district, the route changes names to Centerway and crosses over the Chemung River, which flows east–west through the center of Corning. Across the river, the route traverses more commercial neighborhoods to reach Pulteney Street, designated as NY 415 west of this point. Along this stretch, NY 414 passes the former Corning Armory and the Corning Museum of Glass, the latter located on the southwest corner of the junction with NY 415.

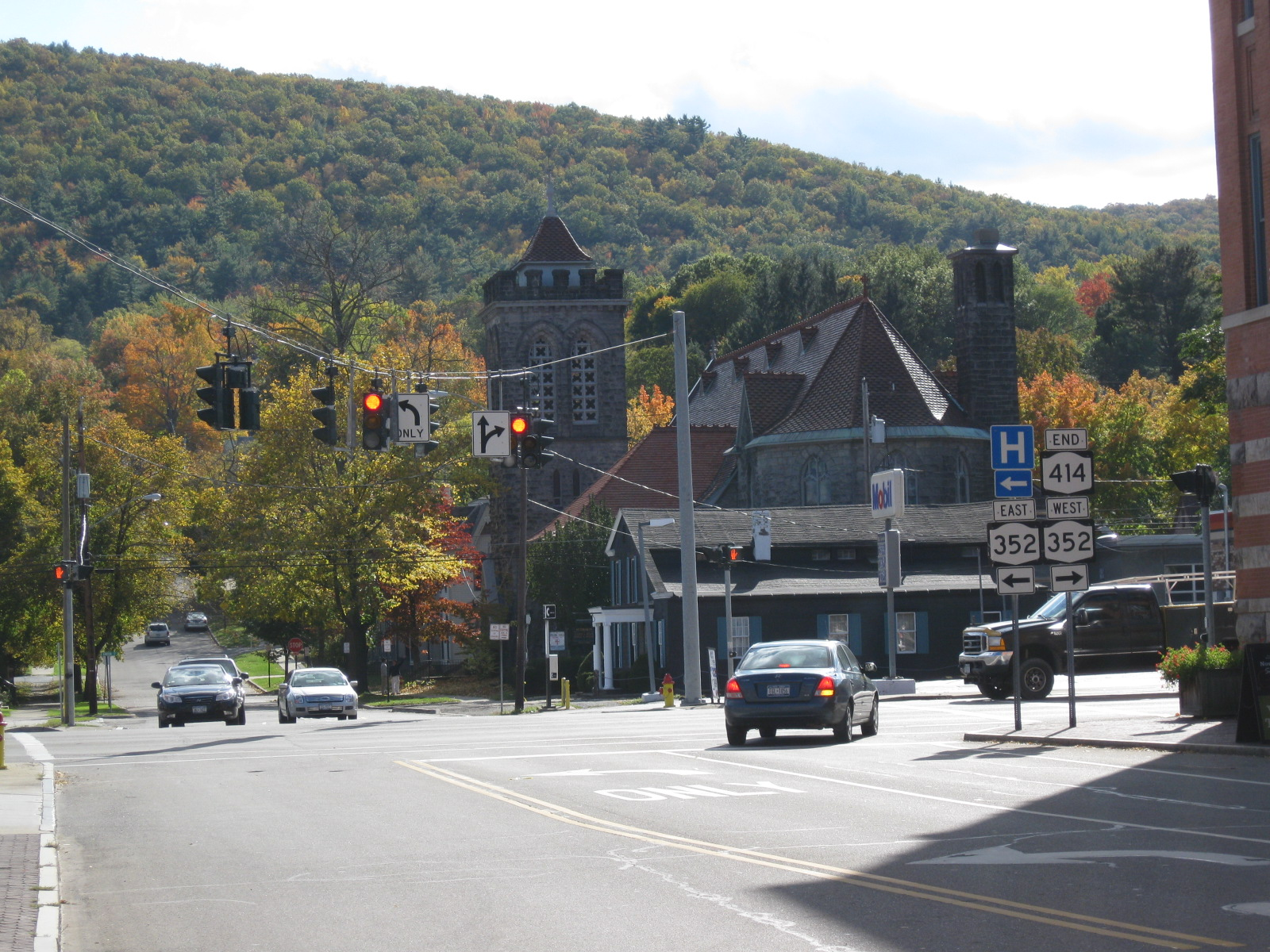
NY 414 at its southern terminus in the city of Corning

The route continues on, meeting the Southern Tier Expressway (STE) at exit 46. The composition of the exit's ramps is unorthodox in that the westbound on-ramp for I-86 and NY 17 is about 0.25 miles (0.40 km) north of the remainder of the interchange. This layout is caused by several factors, including a nearby wye connecting two Norfolk Southern Railway lines—the east–west Southern Tier Line and the north–south Corning Secondary. Another is the alignment of the STE itself, which runs in close proximity to NY 414 for a short distance as it bypasses northern Corning while avoiding the hilly terrain north of the city. North of the STE, the amount of development along the highway significantly decreases as it follows the Corning Secondary northeastward into the mountains that surround the city of Corning.

Over the next 7 miles (11 km), NY 414 and the rail line head due northeast through a valley surrounding Post Creek, traversing rural, isolated areas as both cross into Chemung County. Past the county line, the valley turns to the north, reflecting a similar curve in the creek's routing. NY 414 and the Corning Secondary turn to match, and the route passes over the rail line via a bridge just east of the county line. As the highway heads north, it runs parallel to the county line for 4 miles (6 km) and passes through the hamlet of Chambers, the only developed location along an otherwise nondescript and undeveloped stretch that leads to Schuyler County and the town of Dix.

=== Schuyler County ===
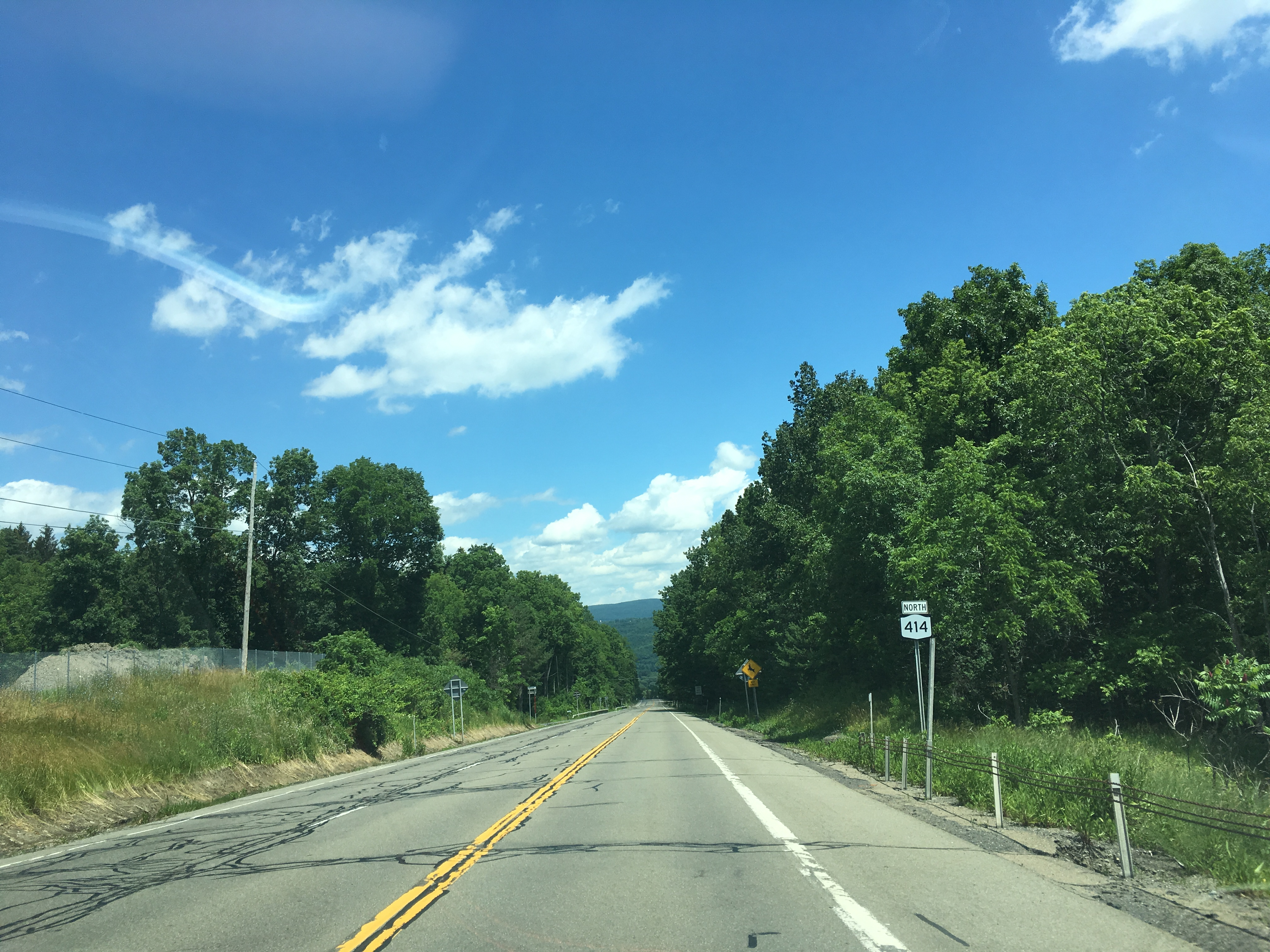
NY 414 northbound past CR 16 south of Watkins Glen

In Dix, NY 414 makes a large reverse S-curve, turning to the east and northeast as it follows the Corning Secondary through another creek valley, this one surrounding Shequaga Creek. The creek eventually heads east toward Montour Falls; however, NY 414 and the rail line continue northeast to the outskirts of Watkins Glen, a village located inside of a wide valley holding Seneca Lake. At the western edge of the gully, the Corning Secondary breaks from NY 414 to follow the ridge north through Watkins Glen State Park. The route, meanwhile, descends the side of the valley to enter Watkins Glen, where it merges with NY 14 at the foot of the hill.

As one road, NY 14 and NY 414 travel down Franklin Street, the main thoroughfare of Watkins Glen. The routes pass by several blocks of homes as they follow the western base of the ravine and meet the east end of NY 329, which ascends the side of the valley to serve Watkins Glen State Park. NY 414 continues to follow NY 14 to Watkins Glen's central business district, where NY 414 splits from the overlap to travel east at an intersection that also acts as the eastern terminus of NY 409. From this point north, NY 14 and NY 414 follow opposite sides of Seneca Lake, with NY 414 running along the east lake shore.

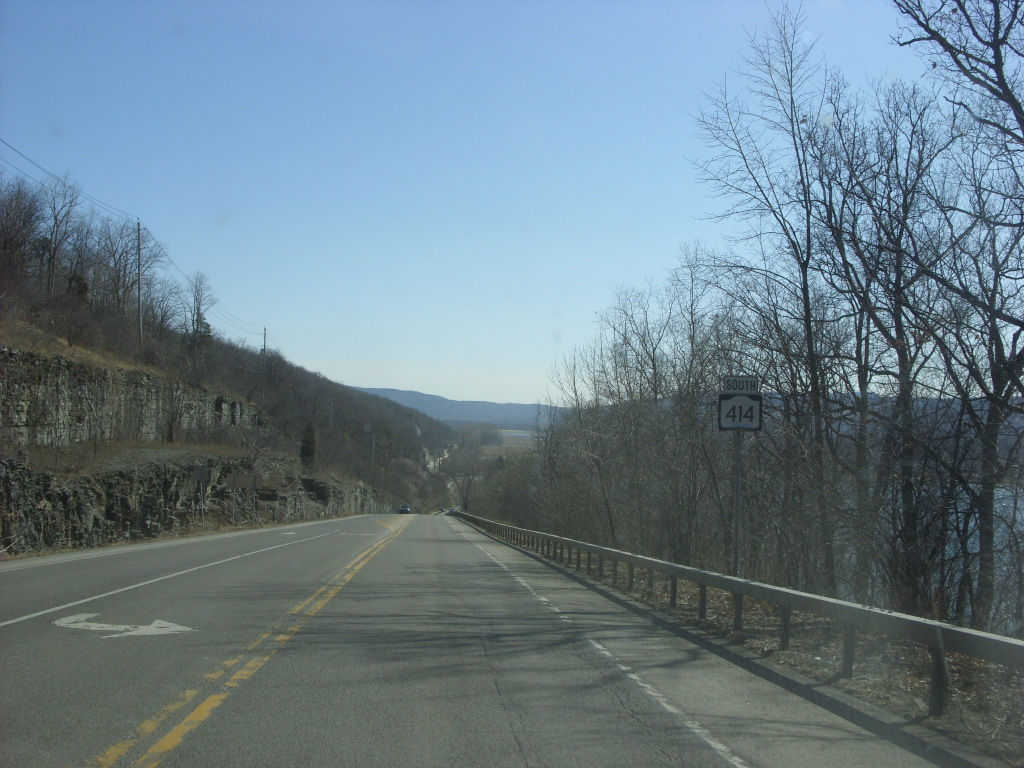
NY 414 southbound in Hector just past the NY 79 junction. This section of the route overlooks Seneca Lake (at right) as it heads downhill.

The route initially heads east from Watkins Glen to skirt the southern edge of the lake, but turns north upon exiting the village and passing the southeastern tip of the waterbody. Just outside Watkins Glen, NY 414 comes to a fork. The left fork carries NY 414 to the foot of the valley, bringing it very close to Seneca Lake. The right fork holds NY 79, which travels up the side of the valley toward the village of Burdett. NY 414 continues to parallel Seneca Lake, but gradually ascends the side of the lake valley as it heads north through the town of Hector and enters Seneca County.

=== Seneca County ===
Soon after entering Seneca County, NY 414 turns to the northeast, traveling away from Seneca Lake. It continues on a northeast alignment across more level terrain to the village of Lodi, where it intersects and forms an overlap with NY 96A. The two routes head due north from Lodi, crossing relatively flat farmland to reach the neighboring village of Ovid. At the northern edge of the community, NY 96A splits from the concurrency at a junction that also features NY 96. While NY 96A travels to the west, NY 96—which enters Ovid from the east—forms a concurrency with NY 414 and follows the latter north out of the village. The overlap continues for 2.5 miles (4.0 km) across more farmland to a junction east of the Seneca Army Depot. NY 96 heads northwest to straddle the eastern border of the depot while NY 414 progresses northward through the sparsely populated towns of Romulus and Varick.

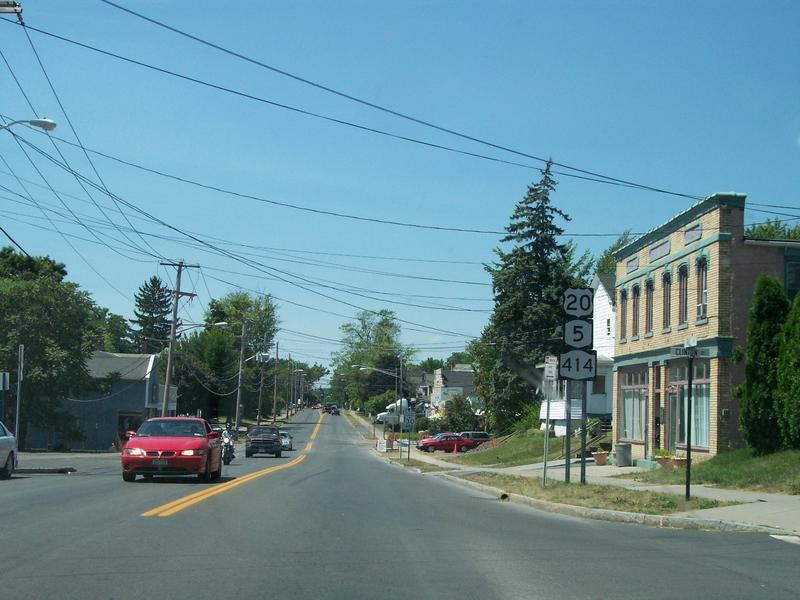
US 20, NY 5 and NY 414 in Seneca Falls

At the Varick–Fayette town line 6.5 miles (10.5 km) north of NY 96, NY 414 intersects the eastern terminus of NY 336. The route continues into Fayette, serving the town center and several large farms on its way into the town of Seneca Falls. Just past the town line, the highway connects to Finger Lakes Regional Airport and passes by a large field that hosts the annual Empire Farm Days exhibition every August. North of here is the hamlet of Seneca Falls, where the farmlands are replaced by densely populated residential blocks. The highway follows Ovid Street across the Cayuga–Seneca Canal to the village center, where it intersects US 20 and NY 5 at Fall Street. NY 414 turns west here, following both routes through the northwestern portion of Seneca Falls. Here, the route passes the National Women's Hall of Fame and the Women's Rights National Historical Park.

West of the village, US 20, NY 5, and NY 414 become a major commercial strip as it heads through an area situated between the hamlet of Seneca Falls and the village of Waterloo. Roughly midway between the two communities, NY 414 splits from US 20 and NY 5, becoming a commercial strip itself as it heads north through the northern portion of the town of Seneca Falls as Mound Road. Near the northern end of the strip, the route crosses the main line of the Finger Lakes Railway at a grade crossing. Past the crossing, the businesses give way to mostly undeveloped areas that persist into the neighboring town of Tyre, where it intersects NY 318 in the small hamlet of Magee as Ridge Road. Just north of this intersection, NY 414 intersects the New York State Thruway (I-90) at exit 41. North of the Thruway, NY 414 maintains a constant north-northwest alignment across rolling farmland into Wayne County.

=== Wayne County ===
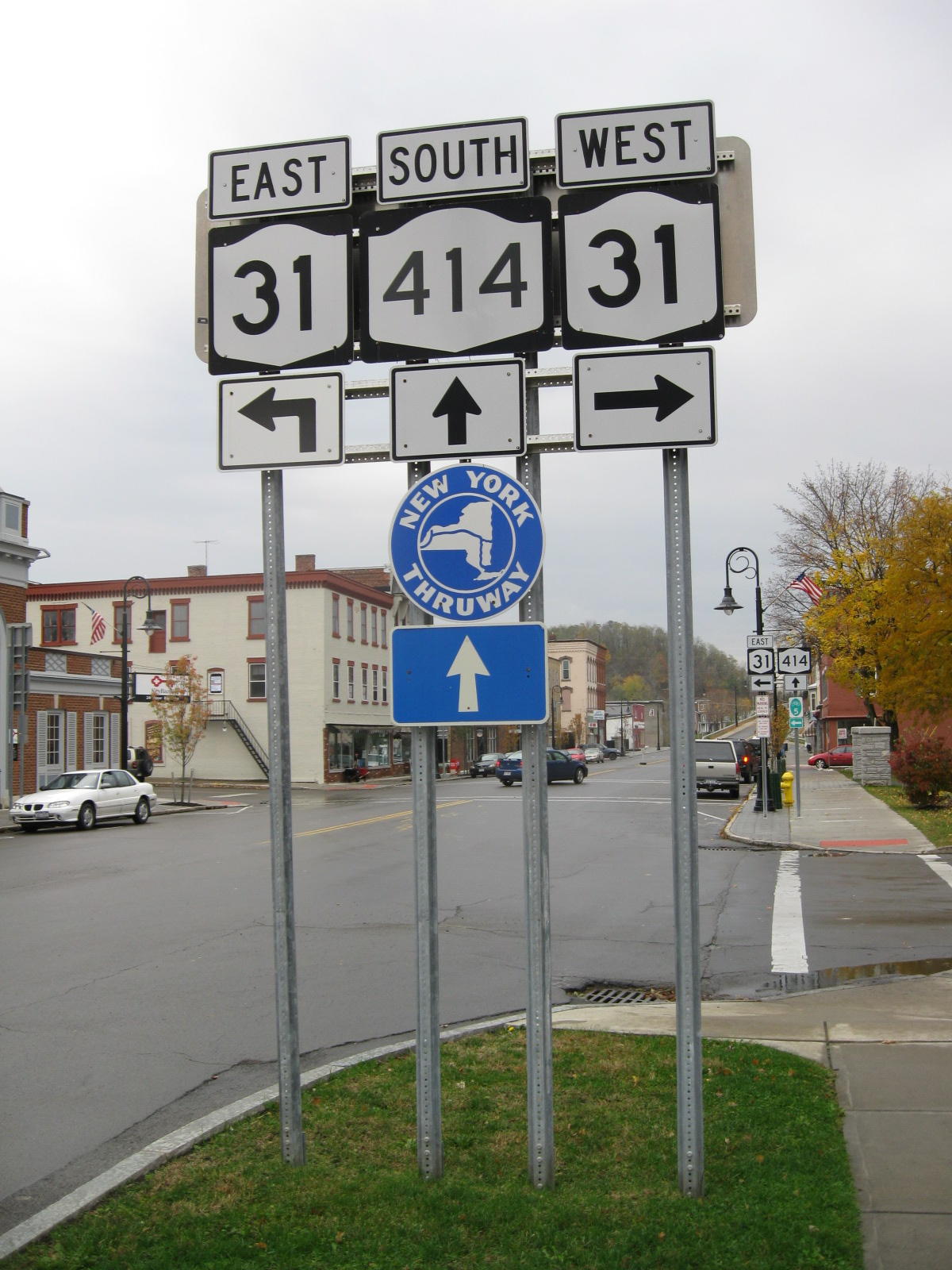
Both ends of NY 414's very short overlap with NY 31 in Clyde

Across the county line, NY 414 veers slightly to the west and east as it heads north across rural terrain to the village of Clyde, located on the Erie Canal and the CSX Transportation-owned Rochester Subdivision. The route traverses the lightly populated southern half of the village prior to crossing the canal and the railroad to enter the village's center. As it proceeds through Clyde's business district, NY 414 intersects NY 31, overlapping the route for just 150 feet (46 m) as NY 31 moves from Park to Genesee Streets. NY 414, meanwhile, continues north through the community on Glasgow Street, passing several blocks of homes and the Clyde-Savannah Central School District's combined middle and high schools before exiting Clyde for more rural regions of Wayne County.

North of Clyde, NY 414 intersects a number of roads of local importance as it heads north-northwest across gentle terrain in the mostly open towns of Galen and Rose as Main Street. Aside from Rose and North Rose, the two communities of note along NY 414 between Clyde and the route's end, NY 414 traverses little more than nondescript cultivated fields. In the latter hamlet, NY 414 crosses the Ontario Midland Railroad at a grade crossing in the center of the community. The route ends about 1.5 miles (2.4 km) north of North Rose at an intersection with NY 104 in the town of Huron, located at the southern tip of Sodus Bay. While NY 414 ends here, the right-of-way of the highway continues north along the eastern edge of the bay to the Lake Ontario shoreline as the county-maintained Lake Bluff Road.

== History ==
=== Origins ===
In 1908, the New York State Legislature created Route 36, an unsigned legislative route extending from Owego to Seneca Falls via Ovid. From Ovid north to Seneca Falls, Route 36 followed what is now NY 414 (via NY 96 and County Route 148 or CR 148 in Romulus). The portion of modern NY 414 between Watkins Glen and Ovid became Route 45 on June 16, 1911; however, the route was realigned one year later to use what is now NY 96A from Lodi to Interlaken instead. When the first set of posted routes in New York were assigned in 1924, the Owego–Interlaken and Ovid–Romulus segments of legislative Route 36 became part of NY 15, which continued northwest from Romulus to Rochester. From Interlaken to Ovid, NY 15 initially followed the post-1912 alignment of legislative Route 45 to Lodi and the pre-1912 routing of Route 45 to Ovid.

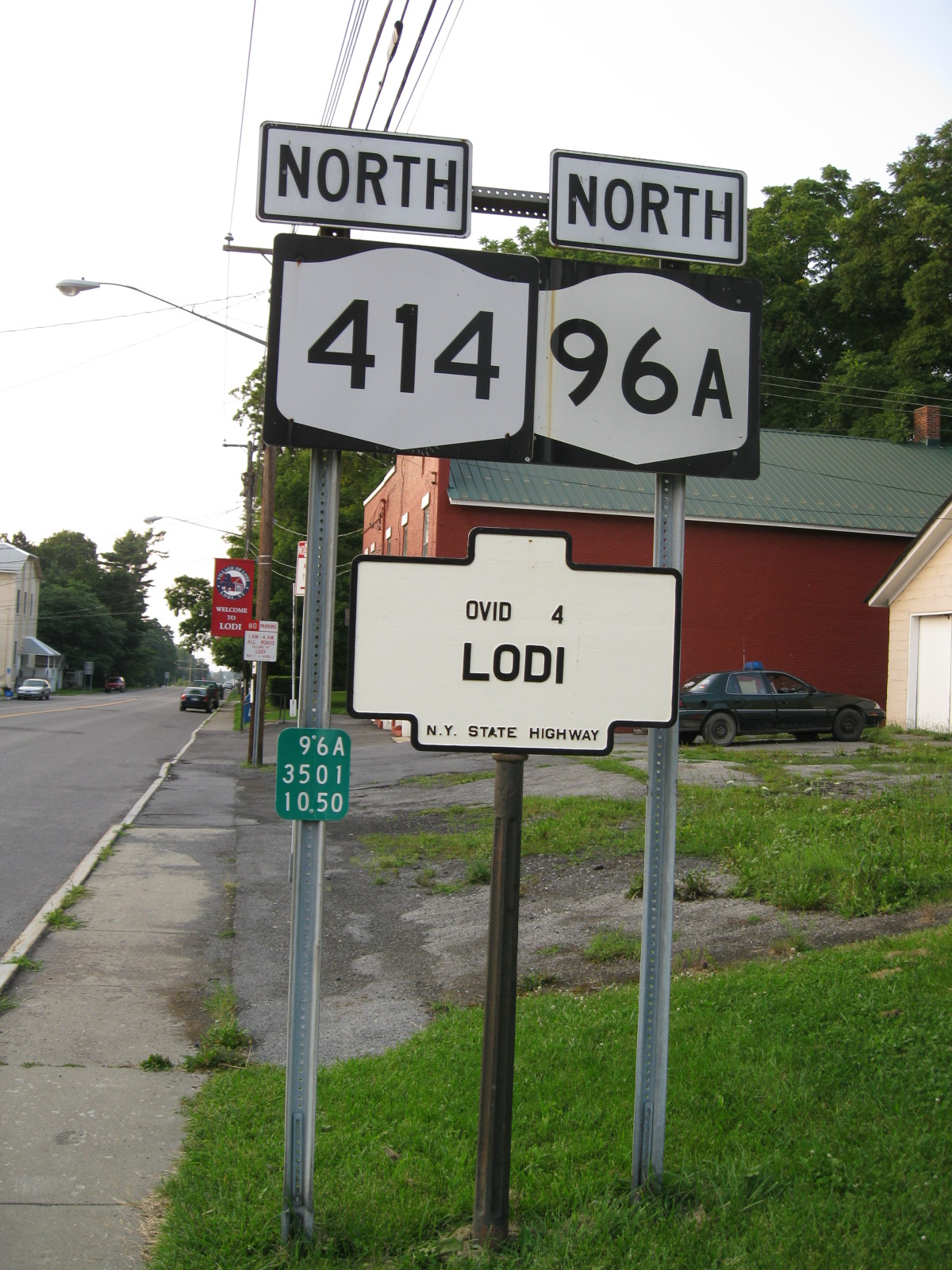
Reassurance markers and an old "N.Y. State Highway" marker along NY 96A and NY 414 in Lodi

The portion of legislative Route 45 south of Lodi remained unnumbered until c. 1927 when it was designated as NY 78. By 1929, the route was extended northward over a new highway that followed the eastern edge of Seneca Lake between Ovid and Geneva. Also altered by this time was NY 15, which was realigned to follow what had been legislative Route 36 from Interlaken to Ovid. The former routing of NY 15 between Lodi and Ovid became part of the extended NY 78. The remainder of what is now NY 414 south of Watkins Glen and north of Romulus remained unnumbered until the 1930 renumbering of state highways in New York, even though parts of the highway were state-maintained as early as 1926. Among these state-maintained but unnumbered segments was the Romulus–Seneca Falls section of the old Route 36. Another significant section of continuous state maintenance existed from Clyde to Huron.

=== Designation ===
In the 1930 renumbering, NY 78 was split into two new routes. North of Ovid, it served as the basis for NY 15A, which continued southeast to Interlaken over the original alignment of NY 15. The remainder of NY 78 became part of NY 44, a lengthy north–south route extending from NY 13 in Caton to Ridge Road (then NY 3 and later US 104) in Wolcott. From Caton to Watkins Glen, NY 44 was assigned to what is now NY 225 and NY 414. North of Romulus, the route utilized the alignment of legislative Route 36 from Romulus to Seneca Falls and modern NY 89 from a junction east of Seneca Falls to Wolcott. In the vicinity of Seneca Falls, NY 44 overlapped with US 20 and NY 5. US 44 was assigned in April 1935; as a result, NY 44 was renumbered to NY 414 to eliminate numerical duplication with the new U.S. Highway.

Also assigned as part of the 1930 renumbering was NY 89, which utilized modern NY 414 north of the hamlet of Magee and the portion of Lake Bluff Road between the current NY 104 super two and Ridge Road. Between Magee and its current alignment east of the village of Seneca Falls, NY 89 used what is now NY 318. In the early 1950s, a north–south connector between NY 89 in Magee and a junction with US 20 and NY 5 midway between Waterloo and Seneca Falls was designated NY 89A. This route became part of a larger realignment of NY 414 on April 30, 1959. In the rerouting, NY 414 was altered to overlap US 20 and NY 5 west out of Seneca Falls before following what had been NY 89A and NY 89 north to US 104 (Ridge Road) near the Huron hamlet of Resort. NY 89, meanwhile, was realigned to follow the former alignment of NY 414 to Wolcott.

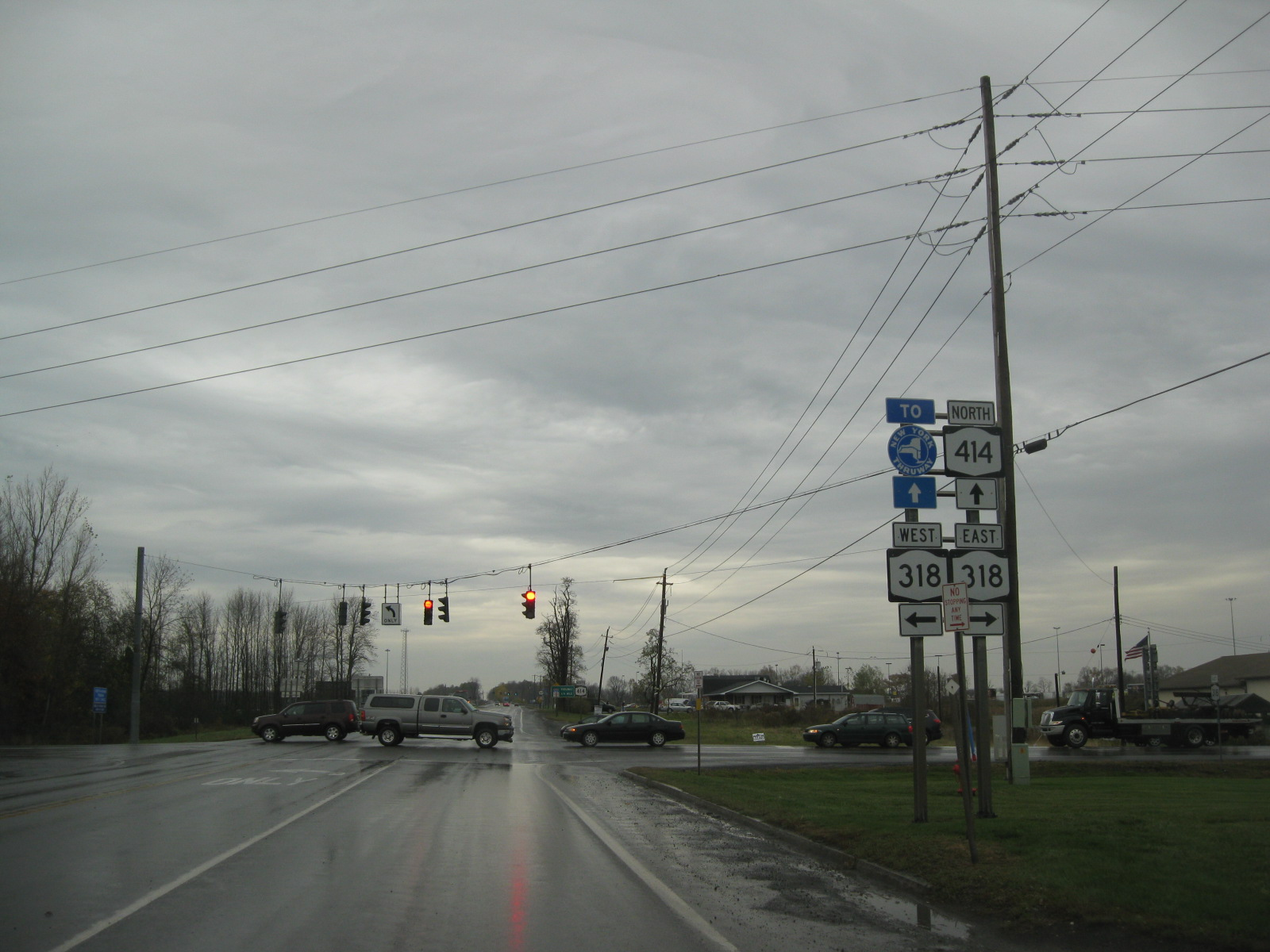
NY 414 north at NY 318 in Tyre. During the mid-1950s, this was the northern terminus of NY 89A.

NY 414 has been truncated twice over the years. The first of these occurred on January 1, 1949, when it was cut back on its southern end to Corning. NY 414 was truncated to its current northern terminus in the mid-1960s following the construction of the super two highway for US 104 between Sodus and NY 414. US 104 continued to use the former alignment of NY 414 along Lake Bluff Road to connect to Ridge Road until the remainder of the super two east to Red Creek was completed in the early 1970s. This portion of Lake Bluff Road is now maintained by Wayne County as CR 254. In Seneca County, NY 414 was realigned slightly in the early 1950s to bypass the hamlet of Romulus to the east, moving it off CR 148 and NY 96 and onto a new road leading directly to Ovid.

=== Corning area ===
In the city of Corning, NY 44, and later NY 414, originally entered from the north on Baker Street and met NY 17 at Pulteney Street. The two routes then overlapped along Pulteney Street to Centerway, where they crossed the Chemung River via Centerway and Pine Street. At Market Street, NY 17 and NY 44 turned east and remained concurrent to Conhocton Street, where NY 44 headed south to Caton while NY 17 continued east on Market to the hamlet of Gibson. When the overlap through Corning was eliminated in 1949, NY 414 was truncated to the western end of the overlap at the intersection of Baker and Pulteney Streets.

NY 414 was re-extended across the Chemung River in the mid-1960s after NY 17 was moved onto Denison Parkway, a new divided highway through Corning that bypassed Pulteney Street. NY 414 followed its original routing across the river to Market Street, then continued south on Pine Street for an additional block to intersect NY 17. The portion of NY 414 south of Pulteney Street was realigned slightly c. 1979 following the completion of the Briscoe Bridge across the Chemung River. Instead of entering downtown Corning on Pine Street, NY 414 used Cedar Street instead. When the Corning Bypass (part of the Southern Tier Expressway) was built in the mid-1990s, Baker Street was split into two segments. NY 414 was subsequently rerouted onto its current alignment through the city.

== Major intersections ==
County	Location	mi	km	Destinations	Notes
Steuben	City of Corning	0.00	0.00	NY 352 (Denison Parkway)	Southern terminus
Steuben	City of Corning	0.63	1.01	NY 415 north (Pulteney Street)	Southern terminus of NY 415
Steuben	City of Corning	0.80	1.29	I-86 / NY 17 / Southern Tier Expressway to I-99 / NY 15	Exit 46 (I-86 / NY 17)
Schuyler	Watkins Glen	20.46	32.93	NY 14 south (Franklin Street) to I-86 east	Southern terminus of NY 14 / NY 414 overlap
Schuyler	Watkins Glen	20.74	33.38	NY 329 west (Old Corning Street) – Watkins Glen State Park	Eastern terminus of NY 329
Schuyler	Watkins Glen	21.11	33.97	NY 14 north (Franklin Street) NY 409 west (4th Street)	Northern terminus of NY 14 overlap; eastern terminus of NY 409
Schuyler	Town of Hector	22.71	36.55	NY 79 east – Ithaca	Western terminus of NY 79
Seneca	Village of Lodi	38.97	62.72	NY 96A south (Seneca Street)	Southern terminus of NY 96A overlap
Seneca	Village of Ovid	43.64	70.23	NY 96 south (North Street) / NY 96A north (North Street) – Sampson State Park, Geneva, Ithaca	Northern terminus of NY 96A overlap; southern terminus of NY 96 overlap
Seneca	Town of Romulus	46.14	74.26	NY 96 north – Romulus, Waterloo	Northern terminus of NY 96 overlap
Seneca	Varick–Fayette town line	52.49	84.47	NY 336 west	Eastern terminus of NY 336; hamlet of Fayette
Seneca	Town of Seneca Falls	59.48	95.72	US 20 east / NY 5 east (Cayuga Street) / Fall Street	Hamlet of Seneca Falls; eastern terminus of US 20 / NY 5 overlap
Seneca	Town of Seneca Falls	61.70	99.30	US 20 west / NY 5 west (Auburn Street) / Water Falls Bridge – Waterloo, Geneva	Western terminus of US 20 / NY 5 overlap
Seneca	Tyre	65.73	105.78	NY 318 – Auburn	Hamlet of Magee
Seneca	Tyre	66.07	106.33	I-90 Toll / New York Thruway – Buffalo, Albany	Exit 41 (I-90 / Thruway)
Wayne	Clyde	74.39	119.72	NY 31 – Lyons, Rochester	
Wayne	Huron	83.20	133.90	NY 104 / CR 254 (Lake Bluff Road) – Rochester, Oswego	Northern terminus
1.000 mi = 1.609 km; 1.000 km = 0.621 mi: Concurrency terminus; Electronic toll collection

== See also ==
- List of county routes in Seneca County, New York
- List of county routes in Wayne County, New York
