= New York State Route 14 =

State highway in western New York, US

New York State Route 14
- Map of central New York with NY 14 highlighted in red, and NY 14 Truck in blue (Concurrency with Clemens Center Parkway is NY 961M)

Route information
- Maintained by NYSDOT and the cities of Elmira and Geneva
- Length: 95.24 mi (153.27 km)
- Existed: 1924–present
- Tourist routes: Great Lakes Seaway Trail

Major junctions
- South end: PA 14 at the Pennsylvania state line in Ashland
- I-86 / NY 17 / Southern Tier Expressway in Horseheads; NY 409 / NY 414 in Watkins Glen; US 20 / NY 5 in Geneva; I-90 / New York Thruway / NY 318 in Phelps; NY 31 in Lyons
- North end: Greig Street cul-de-sac in Sodus Point

Location
- Country: United States
- State: New York
- Counties: Chemung, Schuyler, Yates, Ontario, Wayne

Highway system
- New York Highways; Interstate; US; State; Reference; Parkways
← NY 13A	→ NY 14A

New York State Route 14 (NY 14) is a state highway located in western New York in the United States. Along with NY 19, it is one of two routes to transect the state in a north–south fashion between the Pennsylvania border and Lake Ontario. The southern terminus is at the state line in the Chemung County town of Ashland, where it continues south as Pennsylvania Route 14 (PA 14). Its northern terminus is at a cul-de-sac on Greig Street in the Wayne County village of Sodus Point. NY 14 has direct connections with every major east–west highway in western New York, including Interstate 86 (I-86) and NY 17, U.S. Route 20 (US 20) and NY 5, and the New York State Thruway (I-90). It passes through two cities—Elmira and Geneva—and serves many villages as it traverses the state.

NY 14 was assigned in 1924 to an alignment extending from Elmira to Sodus Point via Watkins Glen, Penn Yan, and Geneva. It was extended south to Pennsylvania by 1926 and realigned as part of the 1930 renumbering of state highways in New York to follow its modern routing alongside Seneca Lake between Watkins Glen and Geneva. Its former routing via Penn Yan became NY 14A, NY 14's lone suffixed route. While the general routing of NY 14 has not changed since 1930, it has been realigned several times within the Elmira area. When it was first assigned, it used several different city streets, including Broadway, Main Street in Elmira, Lake Street, and Main Street in Horseheads. It was gradually reconfigured into its current routing over the years, with the last change coming c. 2004 when the route was shifted onto most of the Clemens Center Parkway.

The portion of NY 14 on Corning Road and College Avenue in Horseheads and Elmira has had several designations over the years. From 1924 to c. 1935, it was part of NY 17. NY 17 was altered c. 1935 to follow a more easterly alignment through the area while NY 328 was extended north from Southport to Horseheads over NY 17's old alignment. NY 14 replaced NY 328 along this stretch c. 1978.

== Route description ==
Most of NY 14 is maintained by the New York State Department of Transportation (NYSDOT); however, two sections of the route are locally maintained. In the Chemung County city of Elmira, the highway is maintained by the city from the junction of College and Woodlawn avenues north to the city limits. In the Ontario County city of Geneva, NY 14 is entirely city-maintained.

=== Chemung County ===
The highway descends South Mountain along the South Creek valley from Pennsylvania, where the route becomes PA 14. As NY 14, the road heads northwestward through the valley, traversing isolated and sparsely populated areas of the town of Southport. It proceeds to the southern outskirts of the city of Elmira, where it crosses Seeley Creek and intersects the northern terminus of NY 328. At this point, the two-lane NY 14 turns northeast onto the Clemens Center Parkway, a four-lane divided highway that cuts through the center of Elmira. The route follows the northern bank of Seeley Creek for roughly 1 mile (1.6 km) to an intersection with Cedar Street, which carries NY 427 east of this point. Past NY 427, NY 14 curves to the north and begins to pass through densely populated residential neighborhoods as it crosses into the city limits.

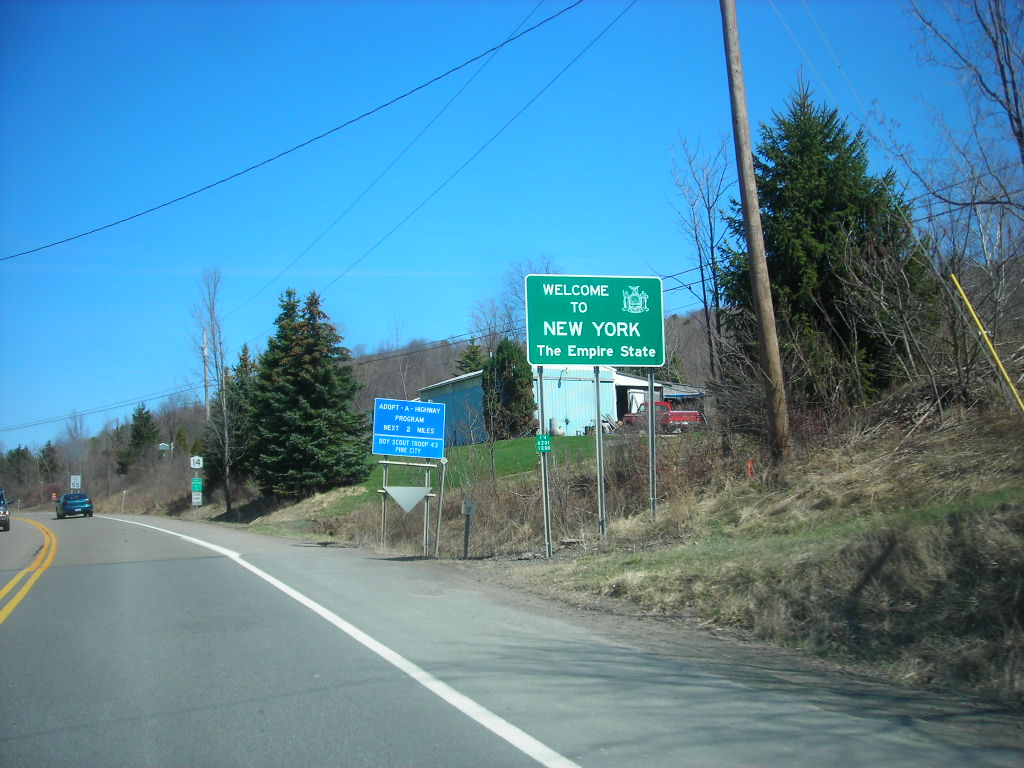
Entering New York on PA 14 northbound. The first reference and reassurance markers for NY 14 are visible here.

In the southern half of Elmira, the parkway winds its way through residential and commercial areas before crossing over the Chemung River to reach the city's downtown district. Here, NY 14 intersects with both directions of NY 352, routed along Water Street eastbound and Church Street westbound. The route continues on, traversing commercial and industrial neighborhoods on the fringe of downtown on its way to a junction with Thurston Street. At this point, NY 14 leaves the parkway to follow Thurston Street and Woodlawn Avenue—collectively one two-lane street—west for three blocks to College Avenue. The route turns again here, following College Avenue north past Eldridge Park to the adjacent village of Elmira Heights. While in the village, NY 14 passes through gradually more residential areas as it heads north. Outside of Elmira Heights, the highway becomes Corning Road and proceeds toward the nearby village of Horseheads.

Just inside of Horseheads, NY 14 meets exit 52 on the Southern Tier Expressway, carrying I-86 and NY 17. North of here, it follows Westinghouse Road through the village until it reaches a T-intersection with Main Street near an area known locally as the Holding Point. From here, the highway turns north to follow Watkins Road into the Catharine Creek valley and out of Horseheads. As NY 14 heads through the less populated valley, it serves Pine Valley, a hamlet situated on the Catlin–Veteran town line, and Millport, a small village in the town of Veteran, before crossing into Schuyler County.

=== Schuyler and Yates counties ===
NY 14 continues through the rural creek valley to the village of Montour Falls, where the Catharine Creek valley widens to hold the nearby Seneca Lake. In Montour Falls, NY 14 intersects NY 224, a highway leading to the far southeastern reaches of Schuyler County. The route continues on to the neighboring village of Watkins Glen, where it runs concurrently with NY 414 through much of the village. The part of this stretch between NY 329 and NY 409 was part of the original Watkins Glen Grand Prix race course. The main entrance to Watkins Glen State Park is also located within this stretch, and the park's 400-foot-deep gorge is visible from the highway. In Watkins Glen, NY 14 is known as Franklin Street and serves as the eastern terminus for both NY 329 and NY 409. The overlap with NY 414 ends in the village center at 4th Street, the same junction where NY 409 comes to an end.

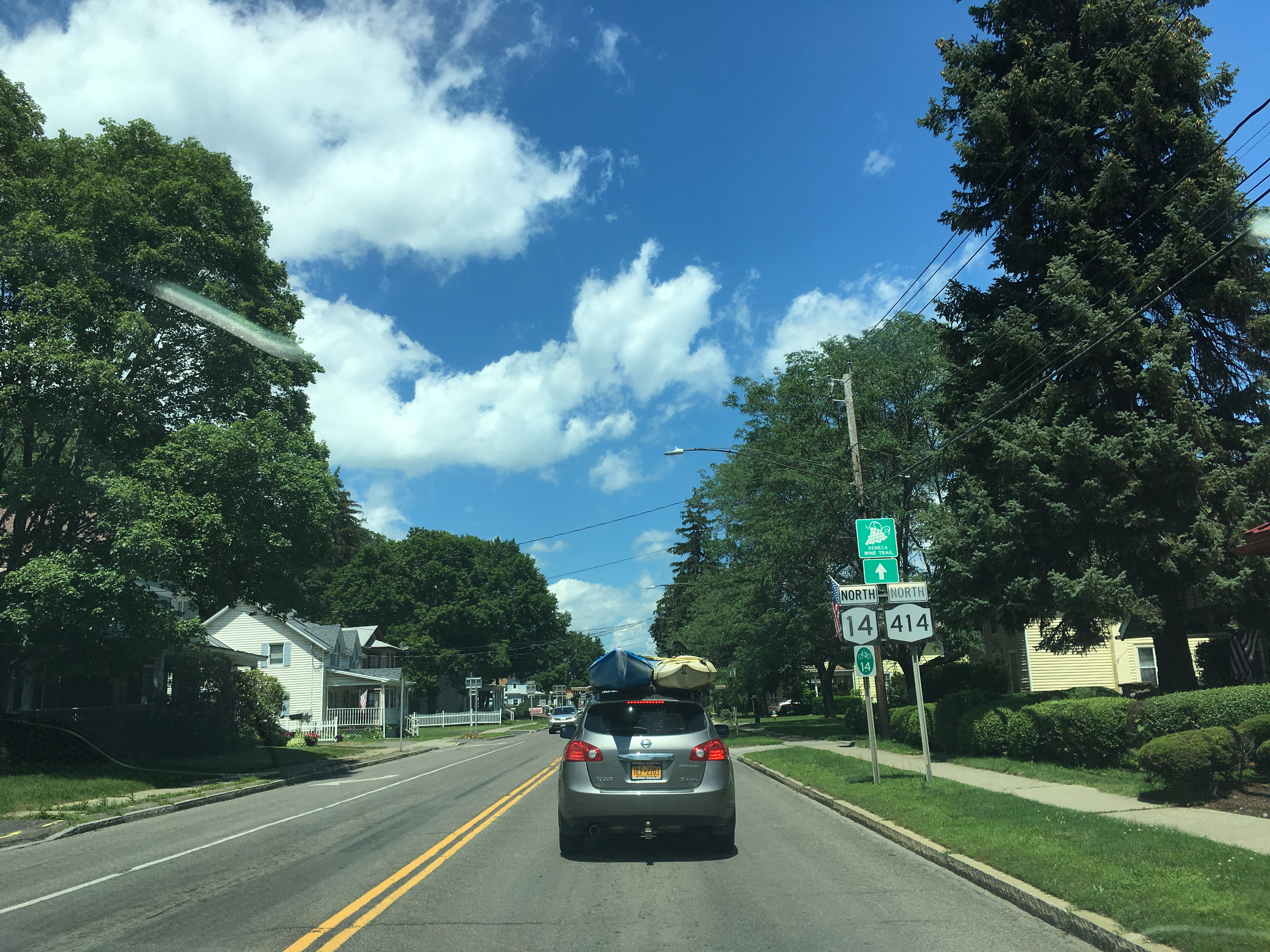
NY 14/NY 414 northbound past the south end of their concurrency in Watkins Glen

North of Watkins Glen, NY 14 runs along a ridge overlooking the west shore of Seneca Lake, which begins just north of Watkins Glen. As it does so, the route begins to parallel a branch line of the Finger Lakes Railway (FGLK), located adjacent to the lake shore at the base of the ridge. NY 14 heads into the heart of the wine region of the Finger Lakes, where a spur—NY 14A—branches off to the west at an interchange in Reading. It continues north along the lakeshore, providing access to several lakeside homes and communities at the east end of local roads leading to and from NY 14. The route itself continues across farmland, however, as it passes into Yates County about 3 miles (5 km) north of the NY 14A junction through the Town of Starkey. In Milo, the FGLK exits the valley and crosses NY 14 at a grade crossing to reach the hamlet of Himrod, situated 0.5 miles (0.8 km) west of the highway.

At Himrod, the FGLK connects to the Norfolk Southern Railway's Corning Secondary, which leaves the hamlet to the north and slowly converges on NY 14. The two cross about 1.5 miles (2.4 km) north of Himrod, at which point the rail line turns to parallel NY 14 as both head toward Geneva and points north. After another 5 miles (8 km) of nondescript farmland, the route reaches the lakeside village of Dresden. While the Corning Secondary goes through the community, NY 14 bypasses Dresden to the west, meeting the northern terminus of NY 54 at a junction west of the village center. Past Dresden, the route descends into the lake valley, closely following the rail line for another 6 miles (10 km) to the Ontario County line.

=== Ontario and Wayne counties ===
The road and the railroad run alongside the lakeshore to the city of Geneva, which NY 14 enters on South Main Street near the campus of Hobart and William Smith Colleges, which are known collectively as The Colleges of the Seneca. There is an interchange with US 20 and NY 5, locally referred to as Routes 5 and 20, near the northeastern corner of the campus. At this point, the Corning Secondary turns northeast to follow US 20 and NY 5 around the eastern edge of the city while NY 14 continues north through densely populated neighborhoods to downtown Geneva. Here, NY 14 turns east, following Castle Street across four blocks of the city's central business district before continuing to the northeast on Exchange Street. At North Street, the last major east–west street that NY 14 meets in the city, Exchange Street turns due north, setting the alignment that most of the route follows from this point north.

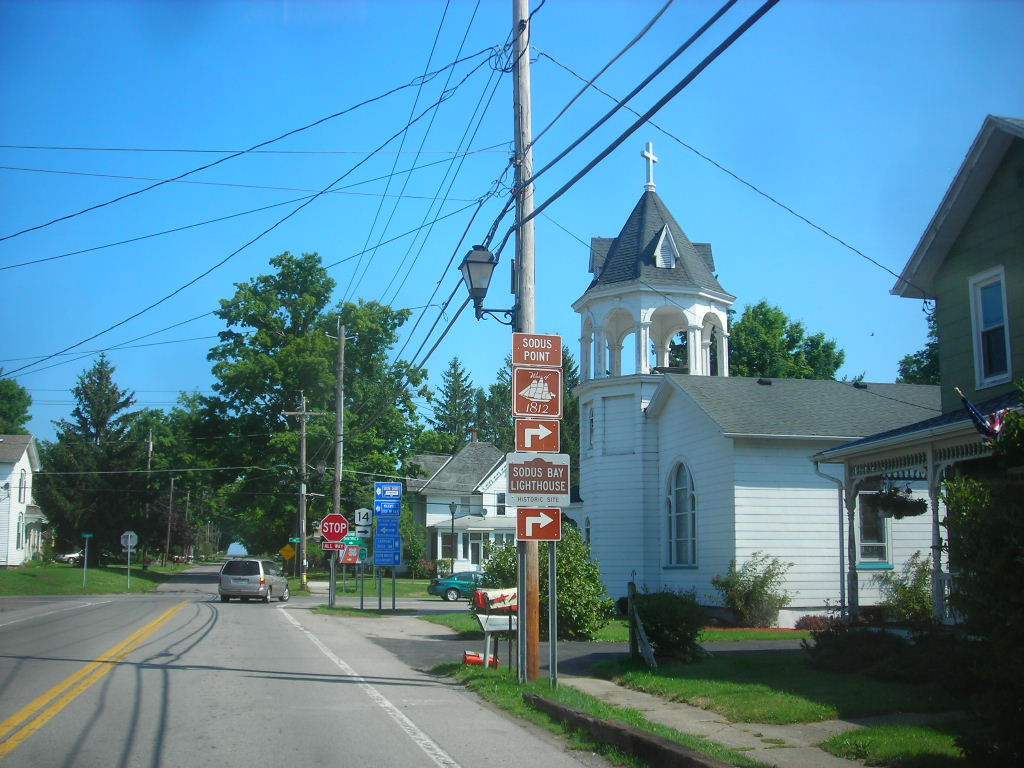
NY 14 northbound at the junction of Fitzhugh and Bay streets in Sodus Point

Outside of Geneva, the Corning Secondary rejoins NY 14, which closely follows the route for much of the next 7 miles (11 km). There are few curves north of Geneva, as the terrain is much flatter north of the Finger Lakes than it is in the southern portions of the highway. As such, it follows a linear north–south alignment to the town of Phelps, where it connects to NY 96 by way of an interchange and NY 318 at a junction just 0.25 miles (0.40 km) north of NY 96. The latter intersection also provides access to the New York State Thruway (I-90) at exit 42. North of the Thruway, NY 14 loosely follows the outlet of Canandaigua Lake through rural, isolated areas as it proceeds toward the Wayne County line. About 1 mile (1.6 km) south of the county line, the rail line veers to the northeast to follow the nearby Erie Canal into Lyons.

NY 14, however, continues on a northerly track as it enters Wayne County and Lyons, becoming Geneva Street upon crossing into the latter. Here, it passes over the Rochester Subdivision, CSX Transportation's main line across western New York, just south of a junction with NY 31 in a commercial area south of the center of the hamlet. The CSX main line serves as the north end of the Corning Secondary, which ends 0.5 miles (0.8 km) east of the NY 14 overpass. The route continues on, crossing over the Erie Canal and passing through the halet's major commercial and residential areas on Geneva and Phelps streets before exiting Lyons. Another 10 miles (16 km) of rolling, open terrain brings the highway to the town of Sodus, where it intersects NY 104 south of the hamlet of Alton.

The route continues into the small hamlet, one of many communities located along Ridge Road. NY 14 joins the old road for one block westward before leaving Alton to the north. From Ridge Road north to Lake Road in Sodus Point, NY 14 is part of the Seaway Trail, a National Scenic Byway. This stretch of NY 14 heads due north across cultivated fields for 2 miles (3.2 km) before curving to the northwest to avoid Sodus Bay. At this point, the farmlands are gradually replaced by waterside homes and communities as NY 14 closes in on the bay's shoreline. It reaches the water's edge as it enters Sodus Point, where it initially follows South Fitzhugh Street. At Lake Road, the Seaway Trail heads west to follow the southern edge of Lake Ontario while NY 14 turns east onto Bay Street. After three blocks, Bay Street gives way to Greig Street, a dead-end street leading out onto a peninsula protruding into the mouth of Sodus Bay. The street and the route both end in a cul-de-sac at the east end of the peninsula.

== History ==
=== Origins and early changes ===
In 1908, the New York State Legislature created Route 12, an unsigned legislative route that extended from Horseheads to Lyons via Watkins Glen, Dundee, Penn Yan, and Geneva. When the first set of posted routes in New York were assigned in 1924, legislative Route 12 became the basis for NY 14, which continued south to Elmira and north to the mouth of Sodus Bay at Sodus Point via the hamlet of Alton. By 1926, the route was extended south through Elmira to the Pennsylvania state line at Ashland. In the 1930 renumbering of state highways in New York, the portions of NY 14 north of Geneva and south of Watkins Glen were unchanged; however, the Watkins Glen–Geneva segment was realigned to follow the west shore of Seneca Lake and serve the lakeside village of Dresden. The former alignment of NY 14 via Dundee and Penn Yan became NY 14A.

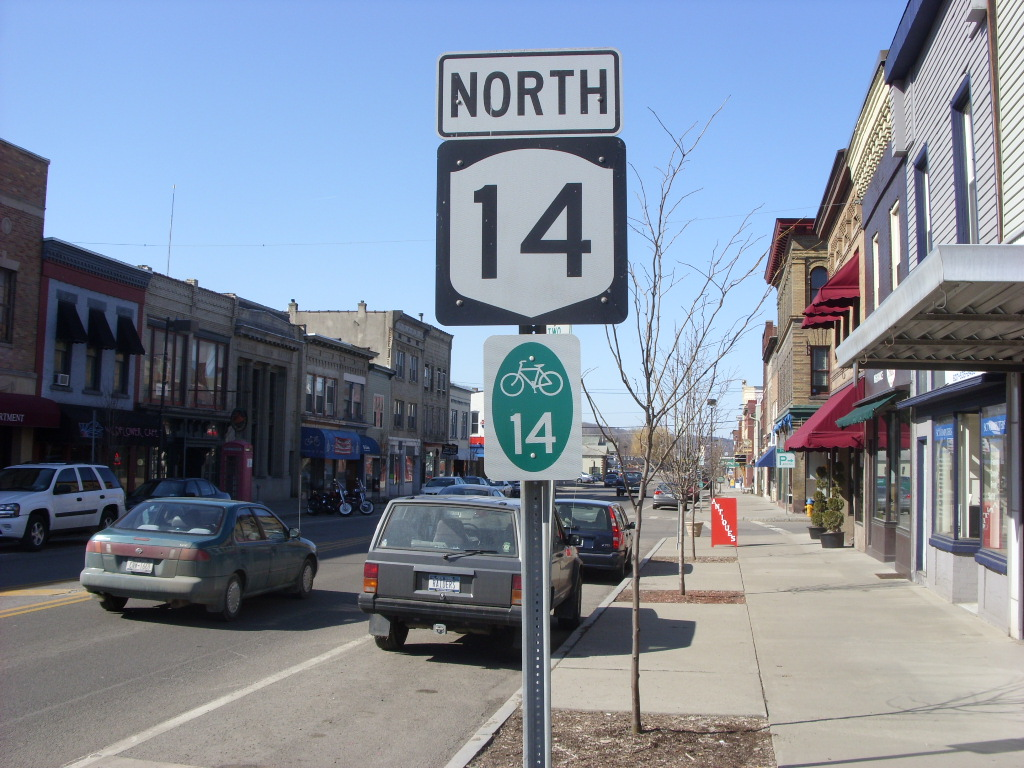
NY 14 northbound in Watkins Glen. This section of the route is also part of New York State Bicycle Route 14.

The original alignment of NY 14 through Elmira took the designation along Broadway and Fulton, Hudson, Main, Water, and Lake streets. Outside of Elmira, it continued north through Elmira Heights to Horseheads on Lake Road and Main Street. At the time, NY 17 entered Horseheads on Big Flats Road and proceeded south to downtown Elmira by way of Corning Road, Oakwood Avenue, Thurston Street, College Avenue, Park Place, and Main Street. By 1932, NY 14 was rerouted to follow Pennsylvania Avenue into downtown Elmira, from where it continued to Horseheads on Madison Avenue, Church, William, Lake, and Division streets, and Grand Central Avenue. From Water Street to Horseheads, NY 14 overlapped with a realigned NY 17. Most of NY 14's former routing along Broadway became part of an extended NY 328.

By the following year, the path of NY 14 and NY 17 through Elmira was modified to consist only of Pennsylvania Avenue and Lake Street. Outside of Elmira, the two routes followed Lake Road and Main Street to Horseheads. NY 328, meanwhile, was extended north to Horseheads c. 1934, utilizing the Oakwood Avenue and Corning Road portions of NY 17's original routing. By 1938, NY 328 was moved onto all of NY 17's original alignment through the city while NY 14 and NY 17 were realigned back onto Division Street and Grand Central Avenue between downtown Elmira and Horseheads.

=== Realignments through Elmira ===
NY 14 was significantly altered by 1947 to follow Broadway past Pennsylvania Avenue to Walnut Street. Here, the route turned to head north through the city on Walnut Street, Roe Avenue, and Davis Street to Elmira Heights, where Davis Street became Oakwood Avenue. At 14th Street, NY 14 turned east, following the street for several blocks in order to rejoin Grand Central Avenue. NY 328, meanwhile, was shifted eastward onto College Avenue between Oakwood Avenue and Thurston Street and realigned south of the Chemung River to follow Pennsylvania Avenue and Main Street by this time. NY 14 was rerouted c. 1961 to bypass the center of Horseheads to the west on NY 17 and Westinghouse Road.

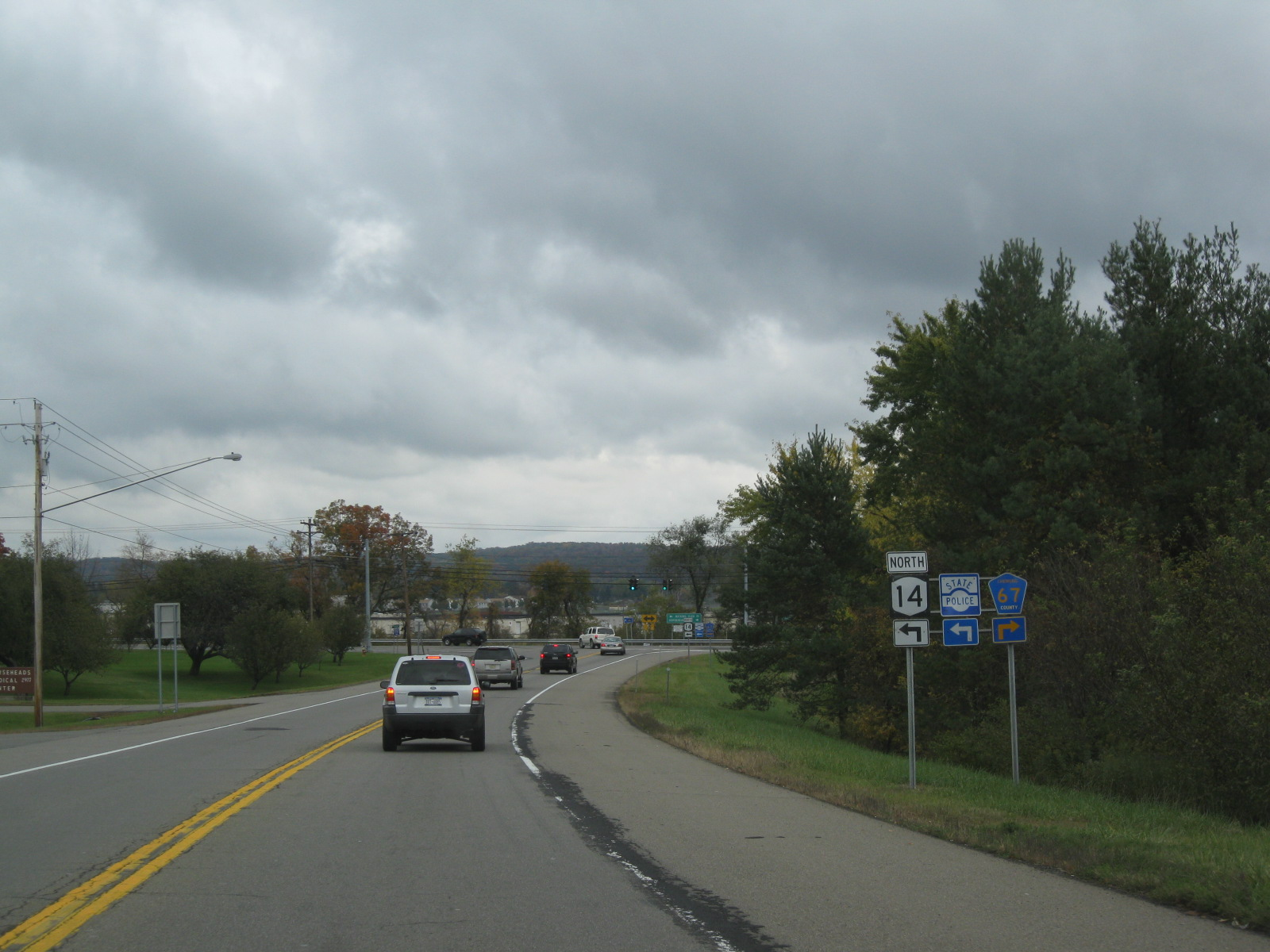
Approaching Chemung CR 67 (former NY 14) on NY 14 northbound near Horseheads

The route was altered again at some point between 1962 and 1964 to follow Pennsylvania Avenue from Southport to downtown Elmira, where it turned east onto Water Street (then-NY 17E) and followed it to what is now exit 56 of the Southern Tier Expressway (NY 17). Here, NY 14 joined the expressway, following it north and west to Grand Central Avenue. The realignment created an overlap with NY 328 from Southport to Main Street and extended the overlap with NY 17 southeast to Water Street. NY 328 was truncated south to its junction with NY 14 in Southport c. 1978. Its former routing from Southport to Horseheads became part of a realigned NY 14.

In the late 1970s, construction started on the Elmira Arterial, a four-lane divided highway through the center of Elmira. The first segment, from Pennsylvania Avenue (NY 14) north to Washington Avenue, was completed c. 1979. An extension of the highway north to Grand Central Avenue was completed by 1990 while another south to Cedar Street (NY 427) was opened to traffic c. 1999. The last section from Broadway to Cedar Street was completed c. 2002. The highway was initially designated as NY 961M, an unsigned reference route. NY 14 was realigned c. 2004 to follow the Clemens Center Parkway from Broadway to Woodlawn Avenue, where it turned west to follow Woodlawn Avenue for three blocks to College Avenue. NY 961M was subsequently truncated to consist only of the 0.20-mile (0.32 km) portion of the highway north of Woodlawn Avenue.

== Major intersections ==
County	Location	mi	km	Destinations	Notes
Chemung	Ashland	0.00	0.00	PA 14 south	Continuation into Pennsylvania
Chemung	Southport	4.47	7.19	NY 328 south (Pennsylvania Avenue)	Northern terminus of NY 328; hamlet of Southport
Chemung	Southport	5.26	8.47	NY 427 east (Caton Avenue) to NY 17	Western terminus of NY 427
Chemung	City of Elmira	7.43	11.96	NY 352 east (Water Street) to NY 17 east	
Chemung	City of Elmira	7.63	12.28	NY 352 west (Church Street) to NY 17 west	
Chemung	City of Elmira	9.15	14.73	East Thurston Street ( NY 961M east)	Western terminus of unsigned NY 961M
Chemung	Village of Horseheads	13.33	21.45	I-86 / NY 17 / Southern Tier Expressway – Elmira, Binghamton, Corning, Jamestown	Exit 52 (I-86 / NY 17); access via NY 962E
Schuyler	Montour Falls	27.22	43.81	NY 224 south (Dawson Boulevard) – Odessa	Northern terminus of NY 224
Schuyler	Watkins Glen	29.41	47.33	NY 414 south to I-86 west	Southern terminus of NY 414 overlap
Schuyler	Watkins Glen	29.69	47.78	NY 329 west (Old Corning Street)	Eastern terminus of NY 329
Schuyler	Watkins Glen	30.06	48.38	NY 409 west / NY 414 north (4th Street)	Eastern terminus of NY 409; northern terminus of NY 414 overlap
Schuyler	Reading	33.32	53.62	NY 14A north – Penn Yan	Southern terminus of NY 14A; interchange; northbound entrance only
Schuyler	Reading	33.62	54.11	To NY 14A north	Access via NY 962C
Yates	Dresden	52.21	84.02	NY 54 south – Penn Yan	Northern terminus of NY 54
Yates	Torrey	52.71	84.83	To NY 54 – Penn Yan	Southbound entrance only; access via NY 961H
Ontario	City of Geneva	64.99	104.59	US 20 / NY 5 (Hamilton Street) – Waterloo, Canandaigua	
Ontario	Town of Phelps	71.12	114.46	NY 96 – Waterloo, Phelps, Clifton Springs	Cloverleaf interchange
Ontario	Town of Phelps	71.68	115.36	I-90 / New York Thruway / NY 318 east – Buffalo, Albany, Auburn	Exit 42 (I-90 / Thruway); western terminus of NY 318
Wayne	Lyons	79.02	127.17	NY 31 (Forgham Street) – Newark, Clyde	Hamlet of Lyons
Wayne	Town of Sodus	89.38	143.84	NY 104 – Rochester, Oswego	
Wayne	Town of Sodus	89.82	144.55	CR 143 east (Ridge Road) / Great Lakes Seaway Trail	Hamlet of Alton; former routing of US 104
Wayne	Town of Sodus	89.90	144.68	CR 143 west (Ridge Road)	Former routing of US 104
Wayne	Sodus Point	93.3	150.2	Lake Road / Great Lakes Seaway Trail	
Wayne	Sodus Point	95.24	153.27	Greig Street cul-de-sac	Northern terminus
1.000 mi = 1.609 km; 1.000 km = 0.621 mi: Concurrency terminus; Incomplete access

== NY 14A ==

NY 14A (35.99 miles or 57.92 kilometres) is an alternate route of NY 14 between Watkins Glen and Geneva, accessing Penn Yan. It was assigned as part of the 1930 renumbering of state highways in New York.

== NY 14 Truck ==
New York State Route 14 Truck
- Location: Geneva

New York State Route 14 Truck (NY 14 Truck) is a truck route of NY 14 in the city of Geneva. NY 14 Truck begins at the interchange between NY 14 and US 20 and NY 5 and follows US 20 and NY 5 northeast to Lake Street. At Lake Street, NY 14 Truck turns west to rejoin NY 14 two blocks later. The truck route bypasses a pair of sharp turns on NY 14 in downtown Geneva.
