= Coon Family Log Cabin =

Historic house in New York, United States

- U.S. National Register of Historic Places
- Location within New York Location within the United States
- Location: 2245 Hornby Rd., Beaver Dams, New York
- Coordinates: 42°17′28″N 76°57′51″W
- Area: Less than one acre
- Built: 1938-1945, 1955
- Architectural style: Log cabin
- NRHP reference No.: 15000802
- Added to NRHP: November 16, 2015

Coon Family Log Cabin is a historic log cabin located near Beaver Dams in Schuyler County, New York. It was built between 1938 and 1945, and is a one-story, irregularly shaped log dwelling with concrete chinking. It is a side gable roof and large stone chimney. Its design and construction was based on local Civilian Conservation Corps camp architecture. Also on the property are the contributing 1 1/2-story large frame barn and shed both built about 1955. It served as a residence for the Coon Family until 1959 and then briefly as a local museum.

It was listed on the National Register of Historic Places in 2015.
