= Watkins Glen Grand Prix Course, 1948–1952 =

- Watkins Glen Grand Prix Course, 1948-1952
- U.S. National Register of Historic Places
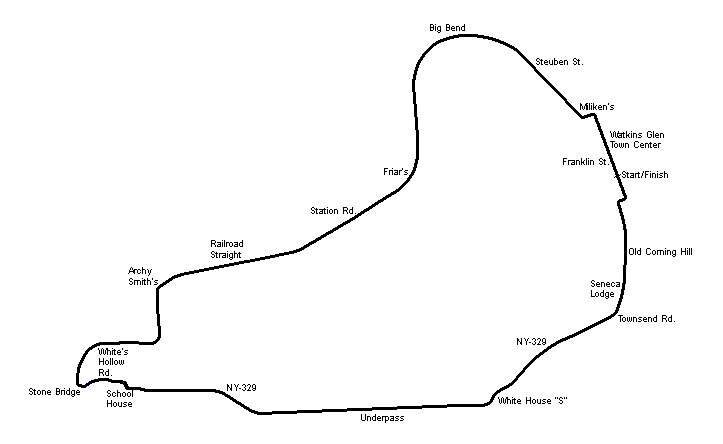
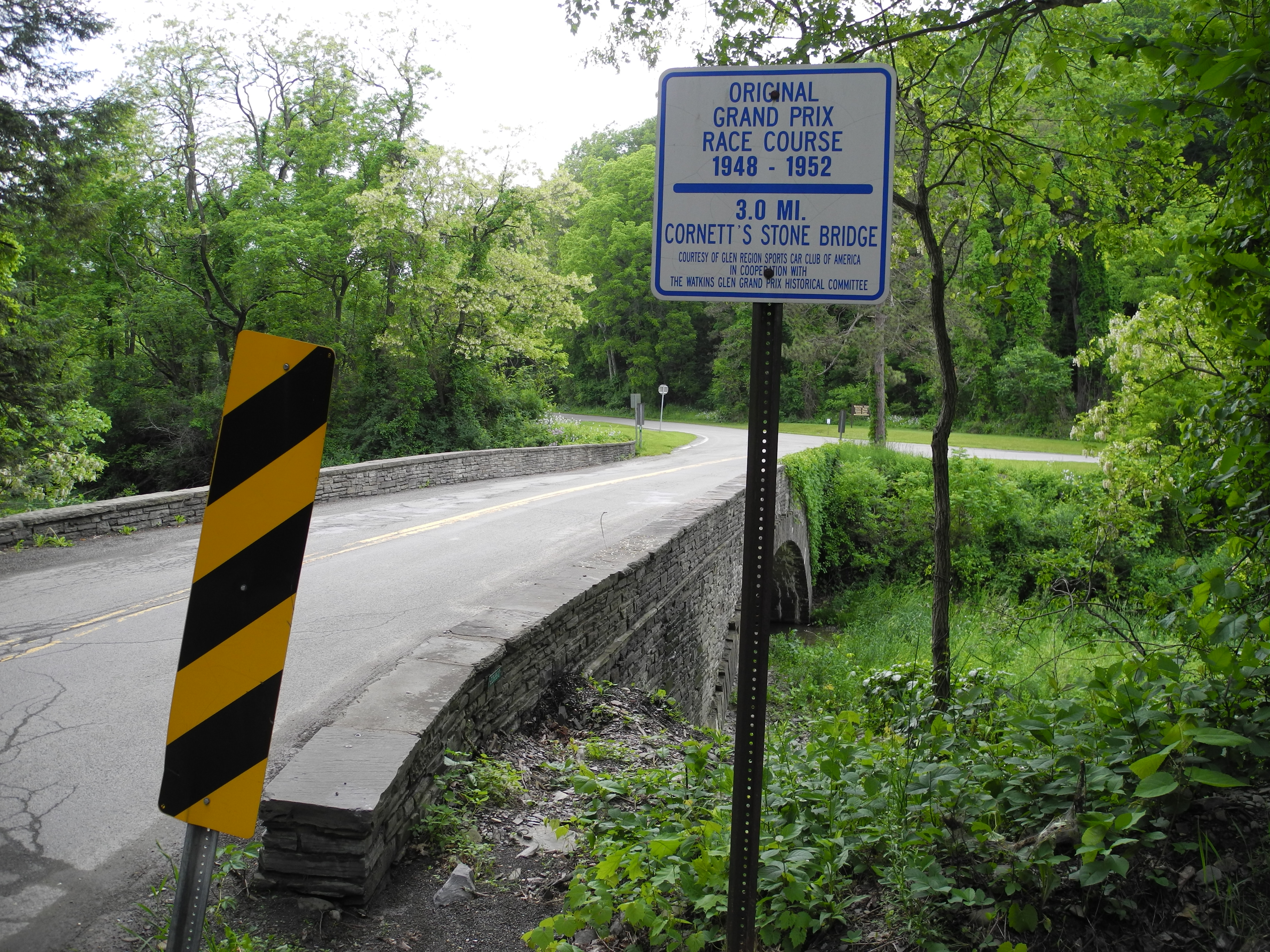

- Location within New York Location within the United States
- Location: Franklin St., NY 329, NY 409, Watkins Glen, New York
- Coordinates: 42°22′15″N 76°53′26″W
- Area: 45 acres (18 ha)
- Built: 1948
- NRHP reference No.: 02001397
- Added to NRHP: December 04, 2002

Watkins Glen Grand Prix Course, 1948–1952 is a historic Sports Car Club of America auto race track located at Watkins Glen in Schuyler County, New York. It includes the public rights of way that constituted the route of the original 6.6-mile (10.6 km) Watkins Glen Grand Prix course used from 1948 to 1952. After a car left the road in the 1952 race, killing one spectator and injuring several others, the race was moved to a new location on a wooded hilltop southwest of town.

It was listed on the National Register of Historic Places in 2002.

== History ==
Watkins Glen had been a popular tourism destination since the 1890s, with visitors often traveling from New York City to visit Watkins Glen State Park and its waterfalls.

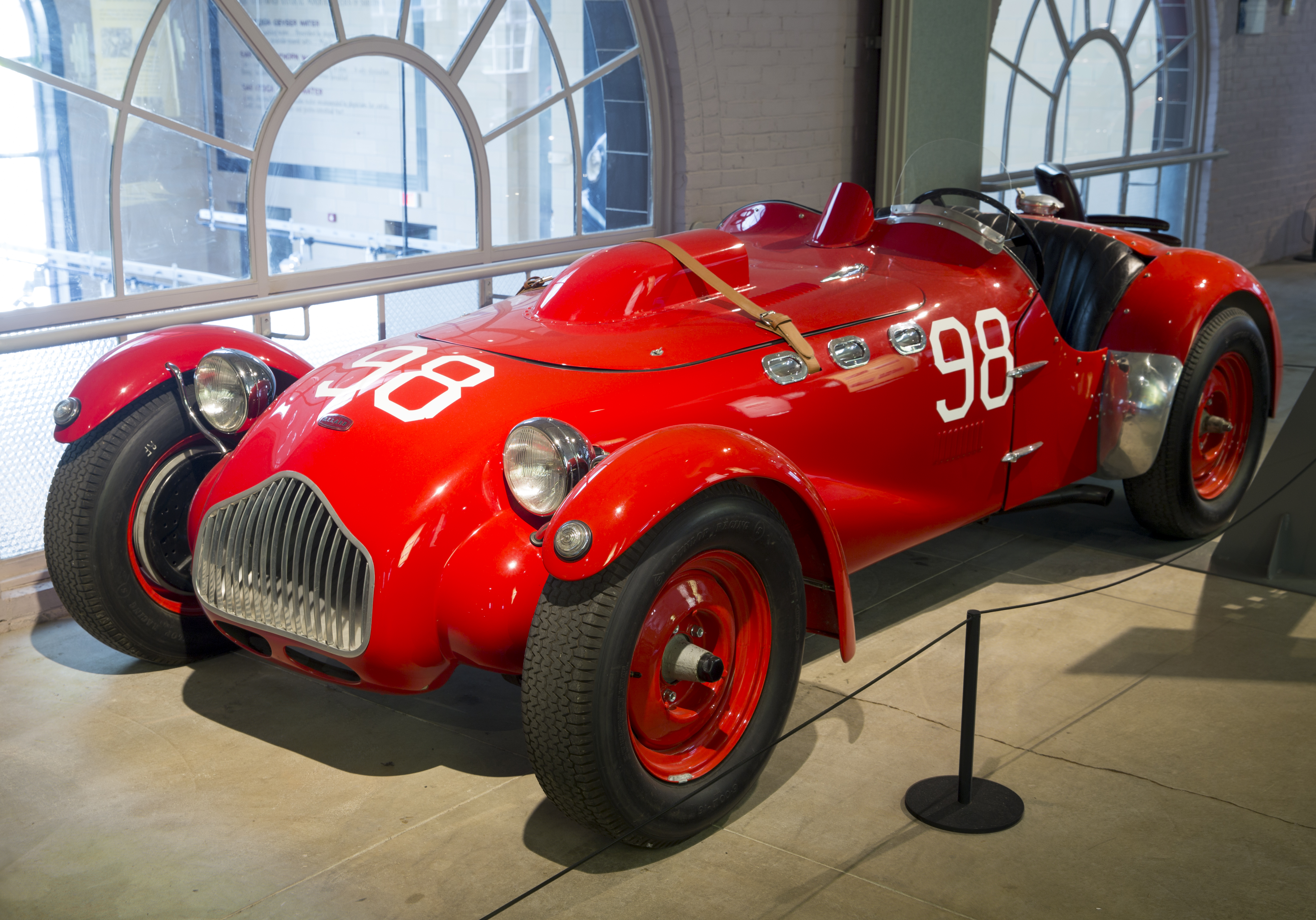
The Allard J2 Roadster that won the 1950 Watkins Glen Grand Prix

Cameron Argetsinger, a law student at Cornell University, traveled to the village in early 1948 and was impressed by the unique driving challenges that the village's roads and streets posed. He visited the village Chamber of Commerce and proposed that they hold a race on the 6.6 miles of road bordering the state park, with the start and finish line placed directly in front of the state park entrance. The village quickly signed on, hoping that an October race would extend the area's tourism season into the fall.

The first race was held in October 1948 and proved to be a popular event. Further races were held in the following years, each drawing large crowds to the village. Both local residents and tourists would pack sidewalks along the route and in the 1952 race, driver Fred Wacker veered off of the track, killing one and injuring twelve.

The 1953 race was moved to a closed circuit of existing roads three miles southwest of the village, before being permanently closed in 1956 to create the first closed-circuit racetrack in the Finger Lakes region.

== See also ==
- 6 Hours of Watkins Glen
- Watkins Glen International
- National Register of Historic Places listings in Schuyler County, New York
