= Watkins Glen State Park =

State park in New York, United States

Watkins Glen
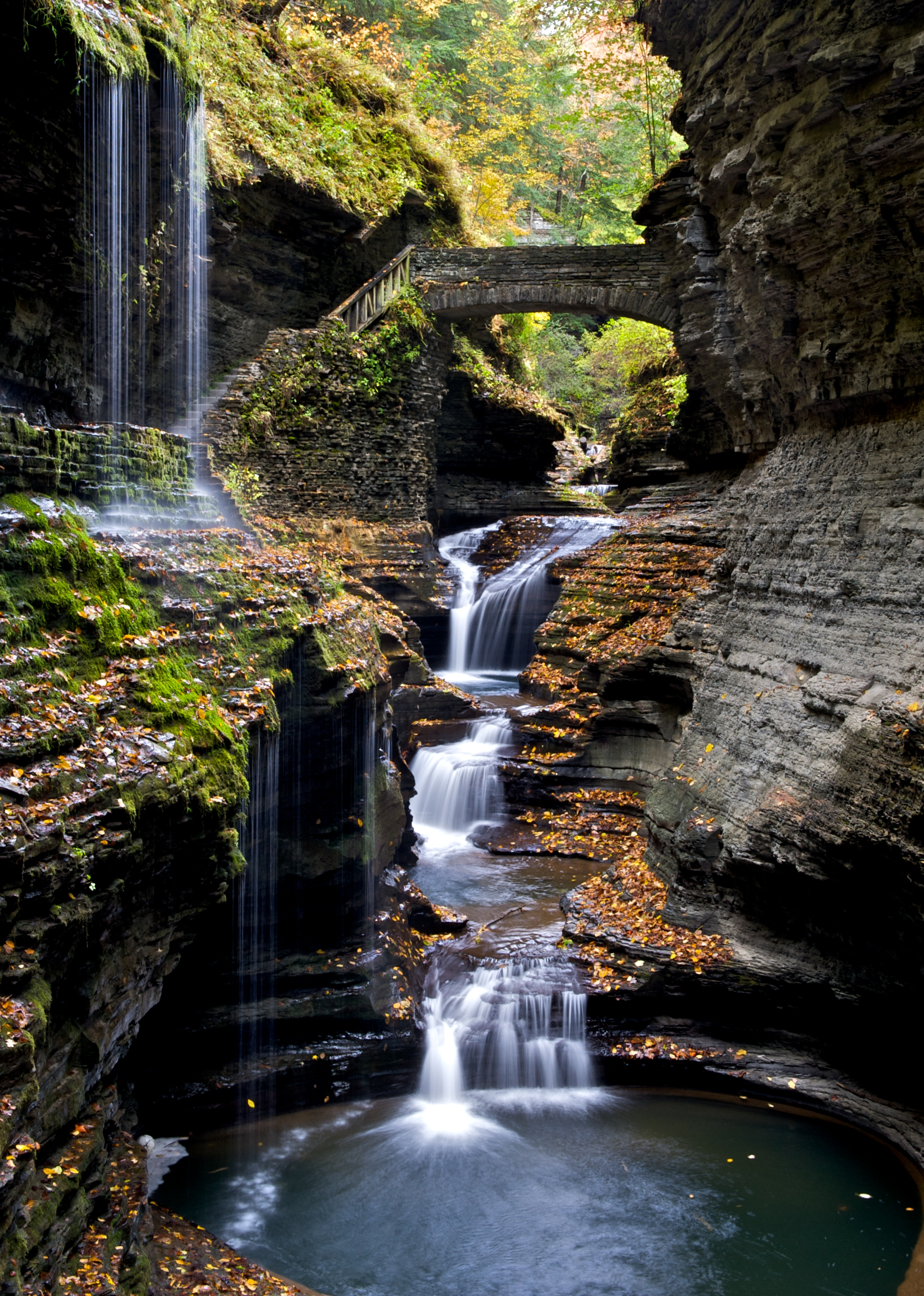
- Rainbow Falls and the Rainbow Falls bridge at Watkins Glen State Park

- Location within New York
- Location: Watkins Glen, Schuyler, Finger Lakes, New York, United States
- Coordinates: 42°22′37″N 76°52′18″W
- Area: 1.216 sq mi (3.15 km^{2})
- Established: December 27, 1906
- Named for: Samuel Watkins
- Visitors: 1,394,999 (in 2025)
- Operator: New York State Office of Parks, Recreation and Historic Preservation
- Website: parks.ny.gov/parks/142/details.aspx

Watkins Glen State Park is in the village of Watkins Glen, south of Seneca Lake in Schuyler County in New York's Finger Lakes region. The park's lower part is near the village, while the upper part is open woodland. It was first opened to the public in 1863 and has been a public park since 1906.

The centerpiece of the 778-acre (3.15 km^{2}) park is a 400-foot-deep (120 m) narrow gorge cut through rock by Glen Creek, a stream that was left hanging when glaciers of the Ice age deepened the Seneca valley, increasing the tributary stream gradient to create rapids and waterfalls wherever there were layers of hard rock. In addition to the gorge itself, the park is widely known for the manmade stone walls and arched bridges spanning the length of the glen.

== History ==
=== Private attraction ===
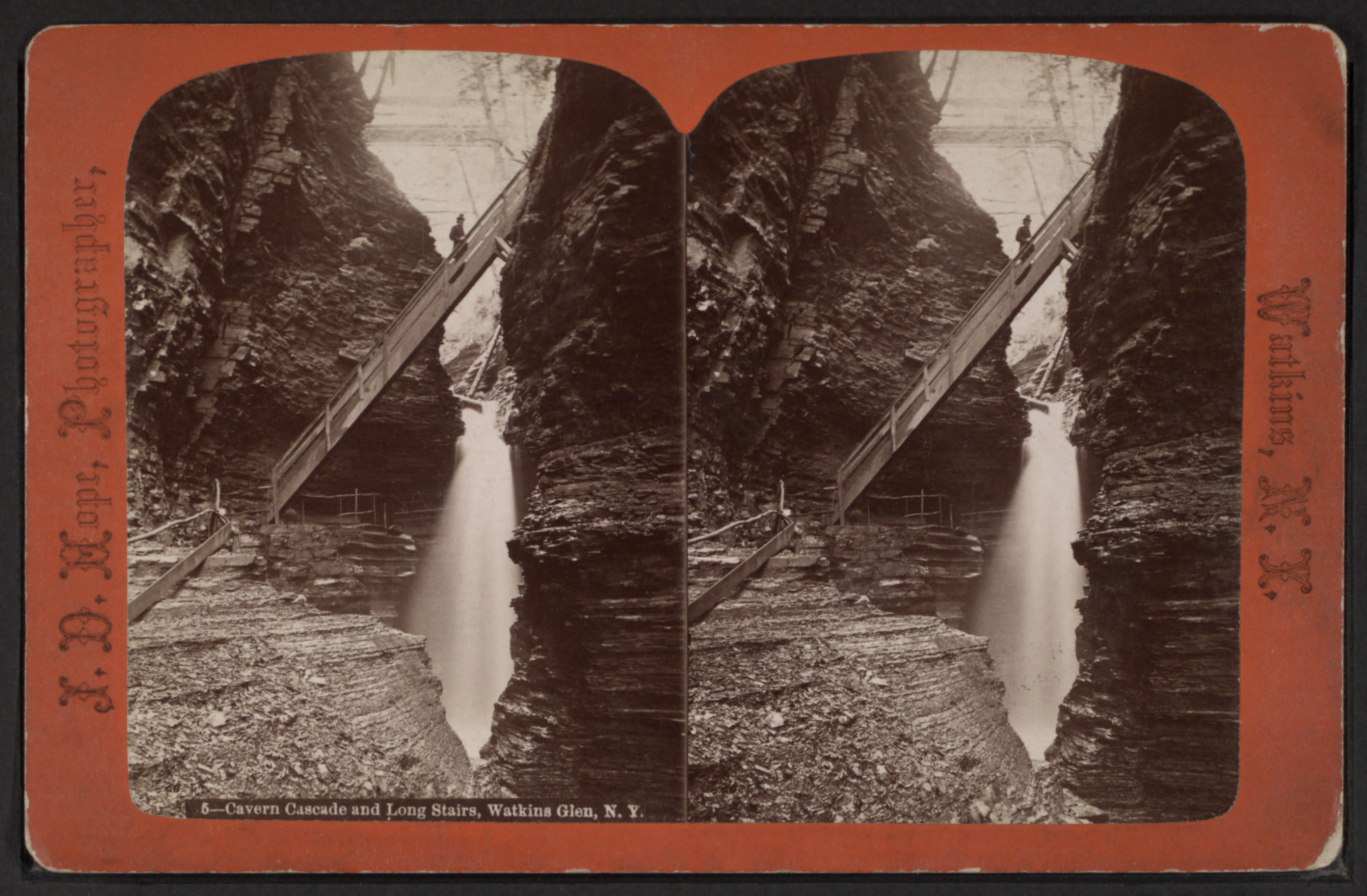
Stereoscope image showing an early staircase at Watkins Glen

Prior to the late 19th century, Watkins Glen had been best known locally, with little outside awareness. That changed in 1863, when Morvalden Ells, a Vermont newspaper editor, opened the site to the public. Ells had crude wooden bridges, stairs, and railings built to make the gorge navigable for middle-class tourists. He also named the various sections of the gorge to help market the varying views found within.

John Lytle became the Glen's proprietor in 1873, and he built a hotel called the Glen Mountain House on the property. In the following decades, Watkins Glen became a nationally known resort and destination. In 1902, the New York Central Railroad began selling Sunday excursion tickets to the Glen from New York City and the area saw an increasing number of tourists choosing to camp during their visit. This led to a decrease in visitors to the Glen Mountain House, which was subsequently demolished after being damaged by a 1903 fire. In its place came the first permanent campgrounds at Watkins Glen.

=== Public ownership ===
Around the turn of the century there was a growing belief that natural wonders such as Watkins Glen should be publicly accessible and not privately owned. The Glen's owners and proprietors agreed with this sentiment, and the American Scenic and Historic Preservation Society (ASHPS) stepped in to oversee the transfer of Watkins Glen from a private attraction to a public park. After six years of negotiations, in 1906 the newly-formed Commissioners of Watkins Glen Reservation took ownership and the ASHPS took over management. The first actions the ASHPS took were to make the park safe for public recreation. They replaced previously 18-inch-wide paths with four-foot-wide paths and replaced all wooden structures with concrete. The gorge trail was rerouted to reduce the number of bridges from ten to three, and new iron railings were installed to line all paths, bridges and stairs. After a political scandal involving perceived misuse of construction funds, management of the park was transferred to the newly-formed Watkins Glen Commission in 1911.

To accommodate increasing numbers of tourists traveling by automobile, the park built a gravel parking lot in front of the main entrance, along with an Arts and Crafts-style Entrance Pavilion. Over the following decades, more pavilions, restrooms, and parking areas were constructed throughout the park. After the creation of the New York State Council of Parks in 1924, the management of Watkins Glen was transferred to the Finger Lakes Commission of that system.

=== Civilian Conservation Corps ===
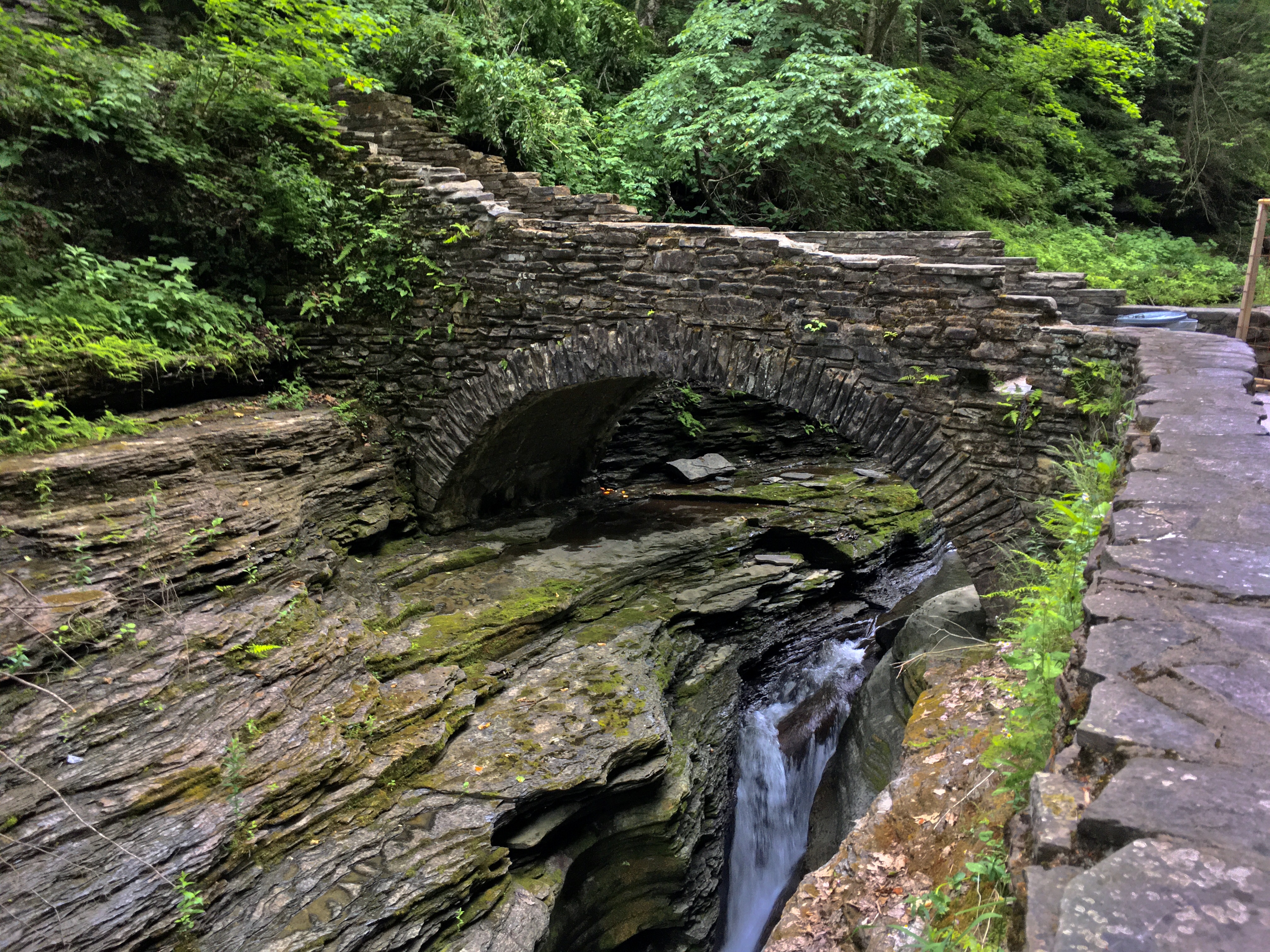
Mile Point bridge at Watkins Glen, one of many constructed by the Civilian Conservation Corps during the Great Depression

After the onset of the Great Depression in 1929, Watkins Glen and other state parks suffered from a decrease in tourism and visitation, forcing delays of maintenance and improvements. After the formation of the federal Civilian Conservation Corps (CCC) in 1933, Watkins Glen began employing men from that program to carry out work in the park.

Starting in 1935, Camp SP-44 was opened in the western end of Watkins Glen State Park. Shortly after the camp was set up, a log jam in the glen was dislodged by heavy rain and the ensuing rush of water destroyed many of the gorge's bridges, railings, and walkways. Park engineers saw a blessing in disguise and took advantage of the blank slate to rebuild the walkways and infrastructure out of low, mortared stone walls and arches. When improvements were completed in 1938, the resulting work made most walkways far less obtrusive to visitors. The CCC troop was disbanded in 1941 due to the onset of World War II and the troop's camp, known as Hidden Valley, was turned over to the local 4-H club.

=== Watkins Glen Grand Prix ===
The first Watkins Glen Grand Prix was held in October 1948. Cameron Argetsinger, a Cornell University law student and racecar driver, had founded the race after seeing how the hilly roads in and around Watkins Glen created unique challenges for drivers. The first race was held on a 6.6 mile stretch of roads bordering the state park, with the start and finish line directly in front of the park's main entrance.

In the following years the race grew increasingly popular. During the 1952 race crowds of locals and tourists densely packed the surrounding sidewalks and a racecar crash resulted in the death of one spectator and the injury of another 12. As a result, the race was relocated to a closed circuit of roads starting with the 1953 race. In the following years it grew increasingly disconnected from the state park.

=== Recent history ===
In the following decades, the park expanded its infrastructure to support larger numbers of onsite campers. A swimming pool was built and opened in 1963, and expanded camping sites were made available in 1967. The park began hosting weekly and nightly concerts at the Main Entrance and South Pavilion during the early 1970s, and the first park interpreter was hired in the following years. They added signage and an interpretive center within the Entrance Pavilion to provide information about the plants and geology of the site.

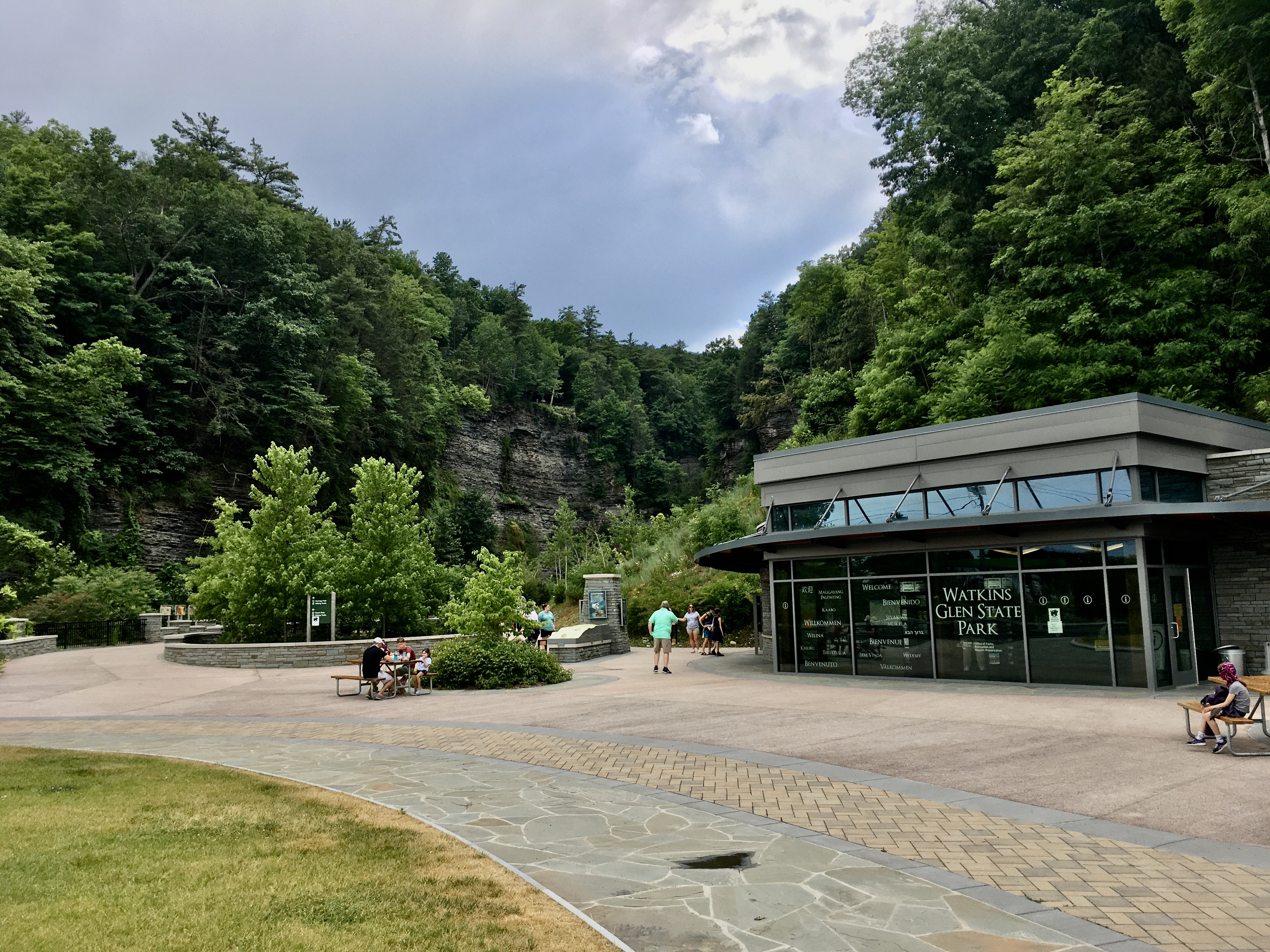
The 2017 Welcome Center and main entryway at Watkins Glen

After the nearby Watkins Glen International racetrack lost hosting privileges for the United States Grand Prix in 1980, park leaders organized efforts to increase visitation and offset the loss of racetrack tourism. In 1983 they opened a light and laser show called "Timespell" in the gorge, which traced the geology of the gorge and Finger Lakes region. To accommodate the new attraction, the park's main entrance was redesigned, with the gateway removed and a large concrete plaza added in front of the Entrance Pavilion. Timespell was initially successful, but began to see declining interest as the technology grew outdated. It was closed in 2001.

After a period of stasis for the park, improvements began to be made starting with a 2017 construction project to remove Timespell infrastructure and redesign the entrance to be more pedestrian-friendly. The main parking lot was relocated further away from the entrance and a new Welcome Center was constructed adjacent to the Entrance Pavilion. The park's classical stone Sentry Bridge was closed in 2025 and replaced by a one-piece stainless steel design, which opened to the public in July 2026.

== Activities and services ==
The park features three trails, open from mid-May to early November, by which one can climb or descend the gorge. The Southern Rim and Indian Trails run along the gorge's wooded rim, while the Gorge Trail is closest to the stream and runs over, under and along the park's 19 waterfalls by way of stone bridges and more than 800 stone steps. The trails connect to the Finger Lakes Trail, an 800-mile (1,300 km) system of trails within New York state.

The park has camping sites, as well as picnic tables and pavilions, food, playground, a gift shop, pool, dump stations, showers, recreation programs, tent and trailer sites, fishing, hiking, hunting and cross-country skiing. The daily parking fee is $10 per car. The park is open year-round, but not all facilities are available at all times. The Gorge trail is closed between around mid-October through late May due to winter conditions and ice on the trail while the other trails remain open.

=== Facilities and structures ===
The state park has featured numerous structures since its founding. In 1912, the Entrance Pavilion was constructed near the north entrance. This Arts and Crafts-style building features embedded glazed tiles and terracotta ornamentation, and was originally roofed with red Ludowici clay tiles. It has undergone extensive renovations and currently houses restrooms and a gift shop.

A 1923 restroom and picnic shelter called the South Pavilion was designed in the "parkitecture" style, and featured a split-faced limestone façade with minimal ornamentation compared to the Entrance Pavilion.

In 2017 the main entrance area underwent a large redesign. In addition to relocating the parking lot to the side and across the street, a new welcome center was constructed. Unlike the earlier structures at the park, which incorporated natural materials, this building was designed in a modern style primarily using glass and metal.

== Geology ==
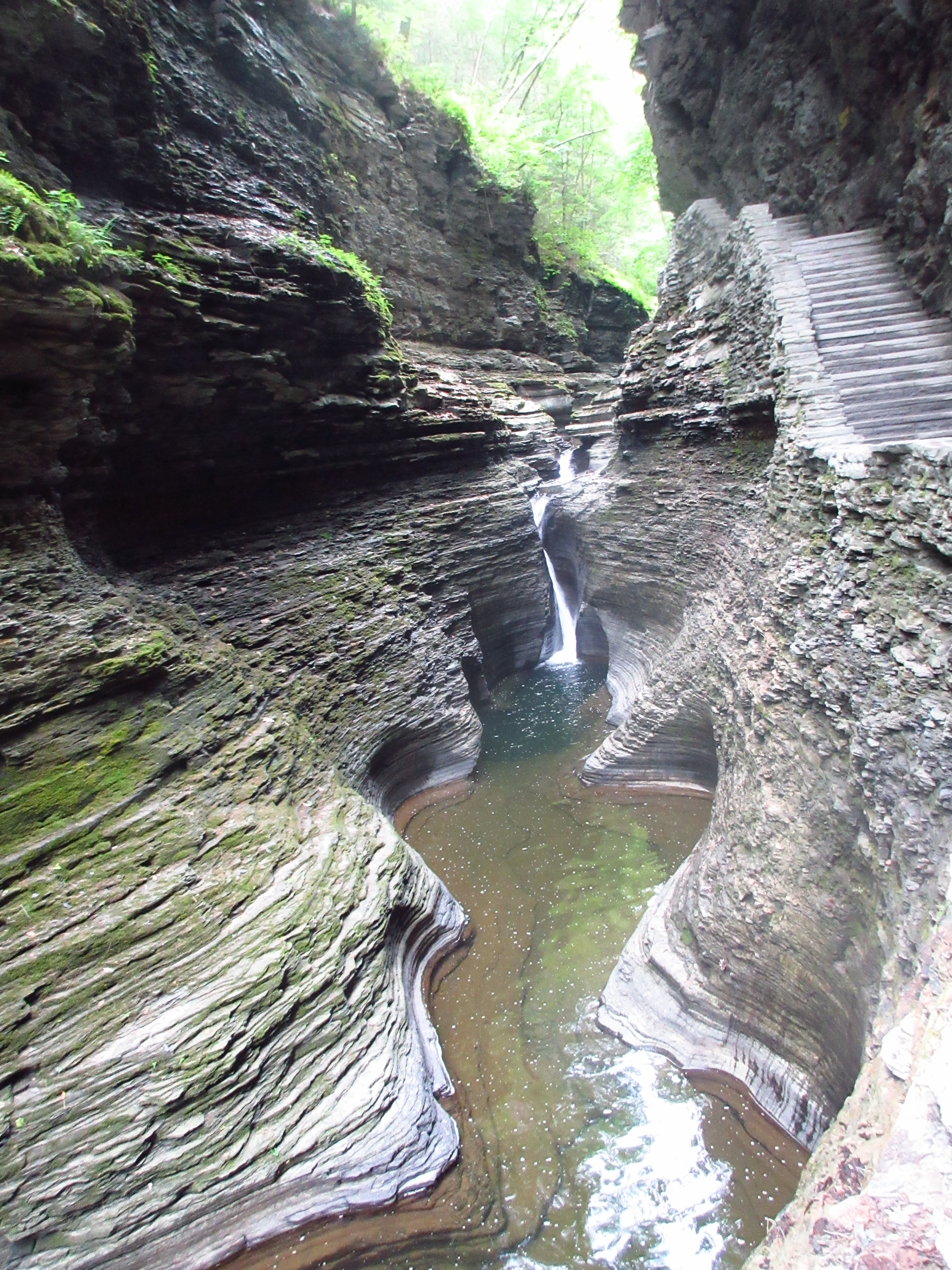
The slot canyon narrows in the section known as the Spiral Gorge.

The area's rocks are sedimentary of Devonian age, part of a dissected plateau that was uplifted with little faulting or distortion. They consist mostly of soft shales, with some layers of harder sandstone and limestone.

During the Pleistocene era, a vast area was covered by ice during the maximum extent of glacial ice in the north polar area. The movement of glaciers from the Laurentide and Wisconsin ice sheets shaped the Finger Lakes region. The lakes originated as a series of northward-flowing streams. Around two million years ago the first of many continental glaciers of the Laurentide Ice Sheet moved southward from the Hudson Bay area, initiating the Pleistocene glaciation. These glaciers widened, deepened and accentuated the existing river valleys. Glacial debris, possibly including terminal moraines, left behind by the receding ice acted as dams, allowing lakes to form. Despite the deep erosion of the valleys, the surrounding uplands show little evidence of glaciation, suggesting that the ice was thin, or at least unable to cause much erosion at these higher altitudes. The deep cutting of the valleys by the ice left some tributaries hanging high above the lakes: both Seneca and Cayuga have tributaries hanging as much as 390 feet (120 m) above the valley floors.

One such hanging valley, overlooking the south end of the Seneca Lake valley, evolved into the deep gorge of Watkins Glen. The steep drop of Glen Creek into Seneca Valley created a powerful torrent that eroded the underlying rock, cutting further and further back towards the stream's headwaters. This erosion was not a uniform process: the rock here includes shale, limestone, and sandstone, and these types of rock erode at different rates, leaving behind a staircase of waterfalls, cascades, plunge pools, and potholes. Watkins Glen State Park now encompasses nineteen waterfalls spaced along a trail roughly two miles (3.2 km) long.

== See also ==
- List of New York state parks
