= List of county routes in Seneca County, New York =

County routes in Seneca County, New York, are not posted on route markers; however, several routes are known only as "County Road #" and are signed as such on street blade signs. The designation is only occasionally shown on street blade signs for routes that have other names. Numbers are generally assigned from the Wayne County line in the north to the Schuyler and Tompkins county lines in the south.

== Route list ==
Route	Length (mi)	Length (km)	From	Via	To	Notes
CR 101	6.82	10.98	Former Seneca Falls village line in Seneca Falls	Gravel Road	CR 105 in Tyre	Part south of NY 318 was formerly part of NY 390A
CR 101A	0.23	0.37	CR 101	County Road 101A in Tyre	Dead end at New York State Thruway	
CR 102	2.31	3.72	Former Seneca Falls village line in Seneca Falls	Black Brook Road	NY 318 in Tyre	Formerly part of NY 390
CR 105	1.07	1.72	CR 101 at Wayne County line (becomes CR 372)	Armitage Road in Tyre	Wayne County line (becomes CR 373)	
CR 105A	0.60	0.97	NY 89	Mays Point Road in Tyre	NY 89	
CR 106	7.91	12.73	NY 96 in Waterloo	Burgess and Birdsey roads	CR 107 / CR 109 in Junius	
CR 107	6.42	10.33	NY 96 / CR 114 in Waterloo	Whiskey Hill Road	Wayne County line in Junius (becomes CR 346)	
CR 108	4.99	8.03	NY 96 / CR 113 in Waterloo	Nine Foot Road	CR 109 in Junius	Part south of NY 318 was formerly NY 391
CR 109	2.99	4.81	Ontario County line	Dublin Road in Junius	CR 106 / CR 107	
CR 110	1.20	1.93	Ontario County line	Border City Road in Waterloo	US 20 / NY 5	Former routing of US 20 / NY 5
CR 112	2.44	3.93	Ontario County line	Packwood Road in Waterloo	US 20 / NY 5	
CR 113	2.44	3.93	CR 112	Edwards Road in Waterloo	NY 96 / CR 108	
CR 114	1.93	3.11	US 20 / NY 5	Brewer Road in Waterloo	NY 96 / CR 107	
CR 116	4.01	6.45	Former Seneca Falls village line	East Bayard and Lower Lake roads in Seneca Falls	NY 89	
CR 117	2.76	4.44	CR 119 at west Waterloo village line	River Street and River Road	California Avenue in Seneca Falls	Discontinuous at NY 96
CR 117A	0.11	0.18	CR 117	Water Falls Bridge in Seneca Falls	US 20 / NY 5 / NY 414	
CR 118	2.73	4.39	NY 96 in Fayette	County House Road	NY 414 in Seneca Falls	
CR 119	4.64	7.47	NY 96A	Boodys Hill and West River roads in Fayette	CR 117 at Waterloo village line	
CR 120 (1)	1.93	3.11	NY 96A	Yellow Tavern Road in Fayette	CR 121	
CR 120 (2)	1.83	2.95	Ritter Road	Marshall Road in Fayette	NY 96	
CR 121	9.66	15.55	NY 336	MacDougall and Yellow Tavern roads in Fayette	NY 89	
CR 122	1.45	2.33	NY 96 in Waterloo	North Road	NY 414 in Seneca Falls	
CR 124	3.25	5.23	NY 414 / CR 154 in Fayette	Town Line and Hoster roads	NY 89 in Varick	
CR 125	9.82	15.80	South 1 Mile in Romulus	Kennedy and East Lake roads	NY 96A in Fayette	Includes spur into Sampson State Park
CR 126	1.90	3.06	CR 125 in Fayette	Yale Station Road	NY 336 in Varick	
CR 127	1.66	2.67	CR 125	Yale Farm Road in Varick	NY 96A	
CR 128	2.35	3.78	NY 414	Ernsberger Road in Varick	NY 89	Former routing of NY 89
CR 129	10.76	17.32	NY 96A / CR 146 in Lodi	County Road 129	NY 414 in Varick	
CR 130	1.57	2.53	NY 96 / NY 414	County Road 130 in Romulus	CR 129	
CR 131	3.79	6.10	CR 136 in Lodi	Upper Lake Road	CR 132 in Ovid	
CR 132	3.99	6.42	East Lake Road at Seneca Lake in Romulus	Gilbert Road and South Street	NY 96A / NY 414 in Ovid	
CR 132A	0.50	0.80	NY 96A	Connection to CR 132 in Romulus	NY 96A	
CR 135	0.40	0.64	Cherry Hill Road in Romulus	County Road 135	NY 96 in Varick	
CR 135A	0.27	0.43	NY 96	Prospect Street in Romulus	CR 148	
CR 136	2.73	4.39	Lower Lake Road in Lodi	Lodi Point Road and West Seneca Street	CR 136A in Lodi village	
CR 136A	0.99	1.59	NY 414 in Lodi	Mill Street	CR 136 in Lodi village	
CR 136B	0.31	0.50	Dead end	Lodi Station Road in Lodi	CR 136	
CR 137	6.41	10.32	NY 414	County Road 137 in Lodi	NY 414	
CR 138	1.78	2.86	NY 96 in Ovid	County Road 138	NY 89 in Romulus	
CR 138A	0.17	0.27	End of county maintenance	Ovid Depot Road in Romulus	NY 96 / NY 414	
CR 139	7.80	12.55	NY 96A	Seneca Street in Ovid	CR 153	
CR 139A	0.18	0.29	CR 139	County Road 139A in Ovid	NY 96	
CR 141	2.51	4.04	NY 96 in Interlaken	Cayuga Street	CR 153 in Ovid	
CR 141A	1.52	2.45	NY 96	County Road 141A in Covert	CR 141 / CR 141B	
CR 141B	0.23	0.37	CR 141 / CR 141A	County Road 141B in Covert	NY 89	
CR 142	3.21	5.17	CR 143	County Road 142 in Covert	NY 96	
CR 143	5.05	8.13	CR 146 in Lodi	County Road 143	NY 96 in Covert	
CR 144	1.29	2.08	Tompkins County line	Kings Corners Road in Covert	NY 89	
CR 144A	0.40	0.64	NY 96	Schier Road in Covert	End of county maintenance	
CR 146	3.97	6.39	CR 143	County Road 146 in Lodi	NY 96A / CR 129	
CR 147	0.42	0.68	NY 96A	Kendaia Road in Romulus	Dead end at Finger Lakes Railway	
CR 148	0.80	1.29	NY 96 in Romulus	County Road 148	NY 414 in Varick	Former routing of NY 414
CR 149	0.14	0.23	Dead end	Caywood Road in Lodi	NY 414	
CR 150	1.14	1.83	NY 96	County Road 150 in Covert	CR 141	
CR 153	2.11	3.40	CR 141	County Road 153 in Ovid	CR 139	
CR 154	3.19	5.13	NY 414 / CR 124	Five Points Road in Fayette	CR 121	

== See also ==
- County routes in New York
