= Covert (disambiguation) =

Covert usually describes events carried out in secrecy.

Covert may also refer to:

== Places ==
=== United States ===
- Covert, Kansas, an unincorporated community
- Covert, New York, a town
  - Covert (hamlet), New York, within the town
- Covert Township, Michigan

=== Antarctica ===
- Covert Glacier, Victoria Land

== People ==
- Covert (surname)
- Covert Bailey (born 1931), American retired author, television personality and lecturer on fitness and diet

== Other uses ==
- Covert (automobile), an automobile built in the United States of America from 1901 to 1907
- Covert feather, a type of feather
- Covert (linguistics), a linguistic classification
- Covert magazine, an Indian political magazine
- Covert, a type of twill textile weave

== See also ==
- Covert coat, a type of men's overcoat made of covert cloth
- Reid v. Covert, a landmark United States Supreme Court decision
