= John Covert =

John Covert may refer to:

- John Covert (painter), American painter
- John Covert (by 1501–58), MP for Sussex and New Shoreham
- John S. Covert (died 1881), shipbuilder and politician
- Sir John Covert, 1st Baronet (1620–1679), MP for Horsham

== See also ==
- John Covert Boyd (1850–1924), Naval surgeon and fraternity founder
- Covert (disambiguation)
