= Covert (hamlet), New York =

Hamlet in New York, United States

Coordinates: 42°34′31.49″N 76°40′59.84″W

Covert is a hamlet in the Town of Covert, Seneca County, New York, United States. It is located four miles (6 km) southeast of the Village of Interlaken and three miles (5 km) northwest of the Village of Trumansburg, at an elevation of 906 feet (276 m). The primary cross roads where the hamlet is located are N.Y. Route 96, West Covert Road, East Covert Road, Schier Road (CR 144A) and Lower Covert Road.

The Covert Historic District is listed on the National Register of Historic Places.
