= New York State Route 2A =

New York State Route 2A was the former name of several sections of highway in New York State:

- New York State Route 11B
- New York State Route 15A
- New York State Route 96A
