= Covert (surname) =

Covert is a surname. Notable people with the surname include:

- Allen Covert (born 1964), American comedian
- Eugene E. Covert, American scientist
- Frank Manning Covert (1908–1987), Canadian lawyer
- James W. Covert (1842–1910), American politician
- Jim Covert (born 1960), former American football player
- John Covert (painter) (1882–1960), American painter
- John S. Covert (died 1881), Canadian ship builder and politician
- Ralph Covert, American singer
- Scott Covert, American artist
