= New York State Route 336 =

State highway in Seneca County, New York, US

New York State Route 336
- Map of Seneca County in central New York with NY 336 highlighted in red

Route information
- Maintained by NYSDOT
- Length: 4.64 mi (7.47 km)
- Existed: c. 1931–present

Major junctions
- West end: NY 96A in Fayette
- East end: NY 414 on Fayette–Varick town line

Location
- Country: United States
- State: New York
- Counties: Seneca

Highway system
- New York Highways; Interstate; US; State; Reference; Parkways
← NY 335	→ NY 337

New York State Route 336 (NY 336) is an east–west state highway located within Seneca County in the Finger Lakes region of New York in the United States. It extends for 4.64 miles (7.47 km), mostly along the Fayette–Varick town line, from an intersection with NY 96A in the town of Fayette to a junction with NY 414 south of the hamlet of Fayette on the Fayette–Varick border. The section of NY 336 that runs along the town line is known as Townline Road. NY 336 was assigned to its current alignment in the early 1930s.

== Route description ==
NY 336 begins at an intersection with NY 96A in a rural, open area of the town of Fayette. The two-lane route heads to the southeast, passing a small number of commercial buildings on the corner of the junction before heading across rolling, undeveloped terrain. After about 0.25 miles (0.40 km), NY 336 merges with Yale Station Road (unsigned County Route 126 or CR 126), here routed along the Fayette–Varick town line. At this point, NY 336 becomes known as Townline Road as it turns east to run along the town line. It passes a handful of isolated homes on its way to the hamlet of MacDougall, a small community built up around the junction of NY 336 and MacDougall Road (CR 121).

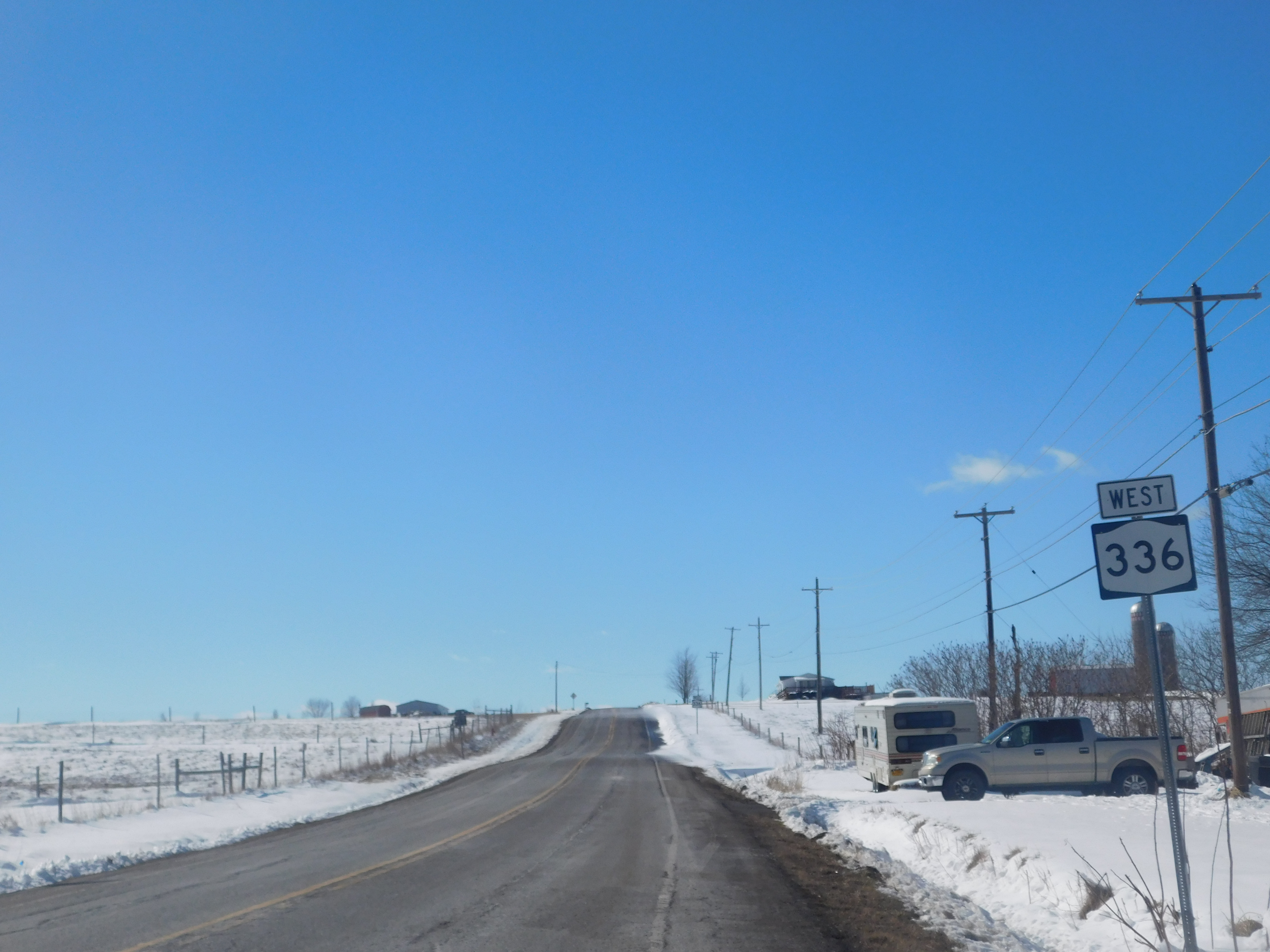
NY 336 eastbound from NY 414 on the Fayette–Varick town line

From here, the route crosses an old railroad grade and Kendig Creek on its way to a signalled intersection with NY 96. East of NY 96, the highway continues across largely open areas of Fayette and Varick, serving little more than farms and the occasional house as it heads along the town line. NY 336 eventually reaches the outskirts of the hamlet of Fayette, where it ends at an intersection with NY 414 (Main Street) at the south end of the village's main north–south residential strip. At this point, the Fayette–Varick town line turns north to follow NY 414 for a half-mile (0.8 km) before resuming its easterly trek across the county.

== History ==
On November 5, 1920, the state of New York awarded a contract to rebuild the Fayette–Varick town line road between MacDougall and what is now NY 96. The highway cost $51,139 to reconstruct (equivalent to $901,516 in 2024), and it was added to the state highway system on October 31, 1921. The 0.8-mile (1.3 km) section west of MacDougall became state-maintained in the mid-1920s when the state assumed maintenance of a 5.5-mile (8.9 km) road connecting MacDougall to the Seneca River at East Geneva. The new state road curved northwest from the town line for a short distance before heading north toward East Geneva on modern NY 96A.

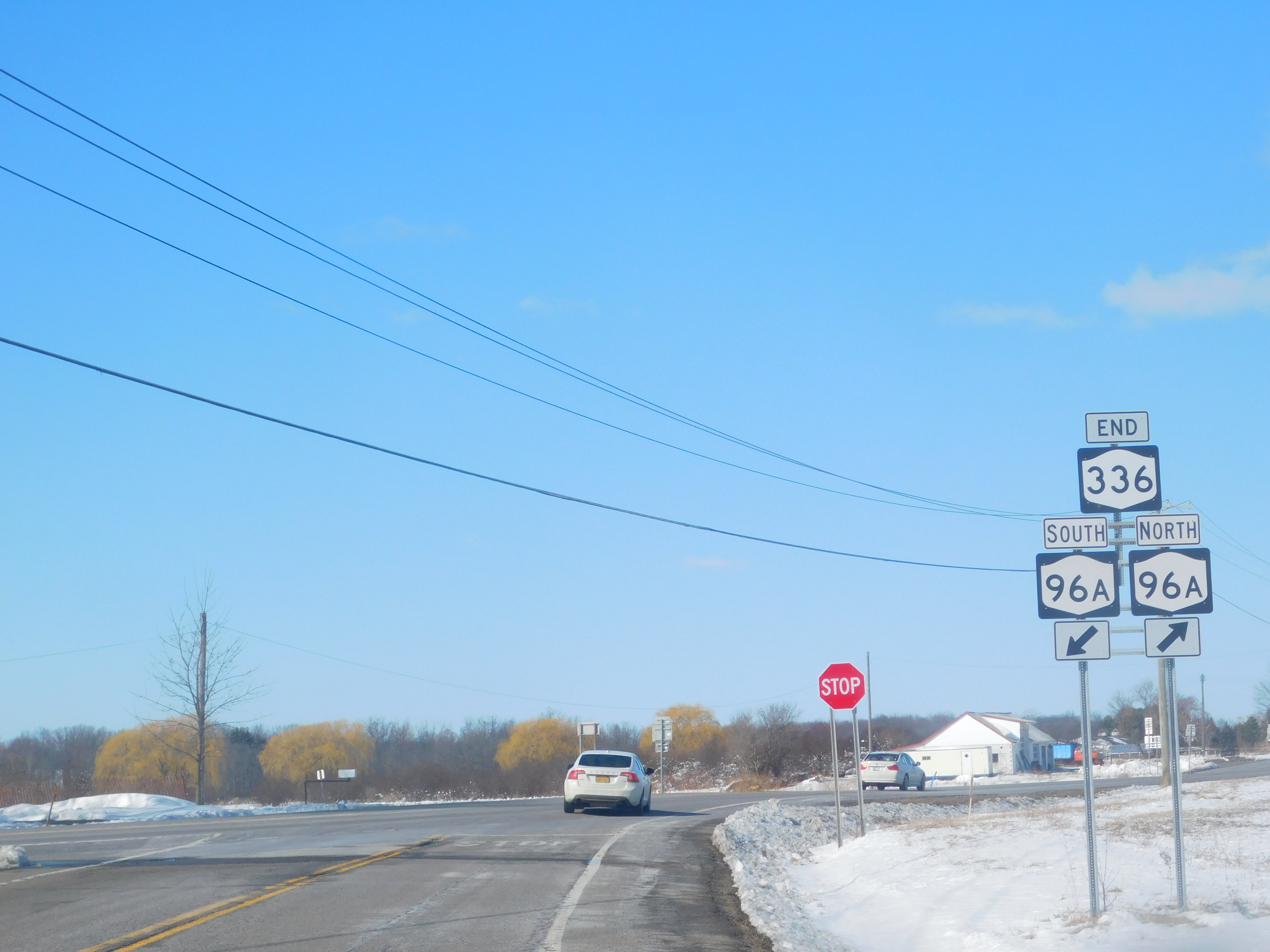
NY 336 at NY 96A in Fayette

In the 1930 renumbering of state highways in New York, hundreds of state-maintained roads were given signed numbers for the first time. By the following year, NY 336 was assigned to an alignment extending for 5 miles (8.0 km) from NY 15A (now NY 96A) just north of the town line in Fayette to NY 44 (NY 414) south of the hamlet of Fayette. The new route utilized the state-owned section of the Fayette–Varick town line road and the small section of the MacDougall–East Geneva road that curved into Fayette. The segment of NY 336 east of NY 15 (NY 96) was accepted into the state highway system in the early 1930s.

By the mid-1960s, the NY 96–NY 336 intersection had become prone to frequent accidents, some of which were fatal. The rash of incidents was attributed to steep grades on NY 336 that created a poor sight line for drivers heading east toward NY 96. In 1968, the state of New York rebuilt the 1,500-foot (460 m) section of NY 336 leading west from NY 96, lowering the highway by as much as 3 feet (0.91 m) to reduce the grade of the road's approach. A four-way flashing traffic light was also installed at the junction as part of the project. In early 2013 a three-color signal was installed at the intersection, going into operation on May 20.

== Major intersections ==
The entire route is in Seneca County.

Location	mi	km	Destinations	Notes
Fayette	0.00	0.00	NY 96A	Western terminus
Fayette–Varick town line	2.82	4.54	NY 96	
Fayette–Varick town line	4.64	7.47	NY 414	Eastern terminus
1.000 mi = 1.609 km; 1.000 km = 0.621 mi
