= Lodi Point State Park =

State park in Seneca County, New York

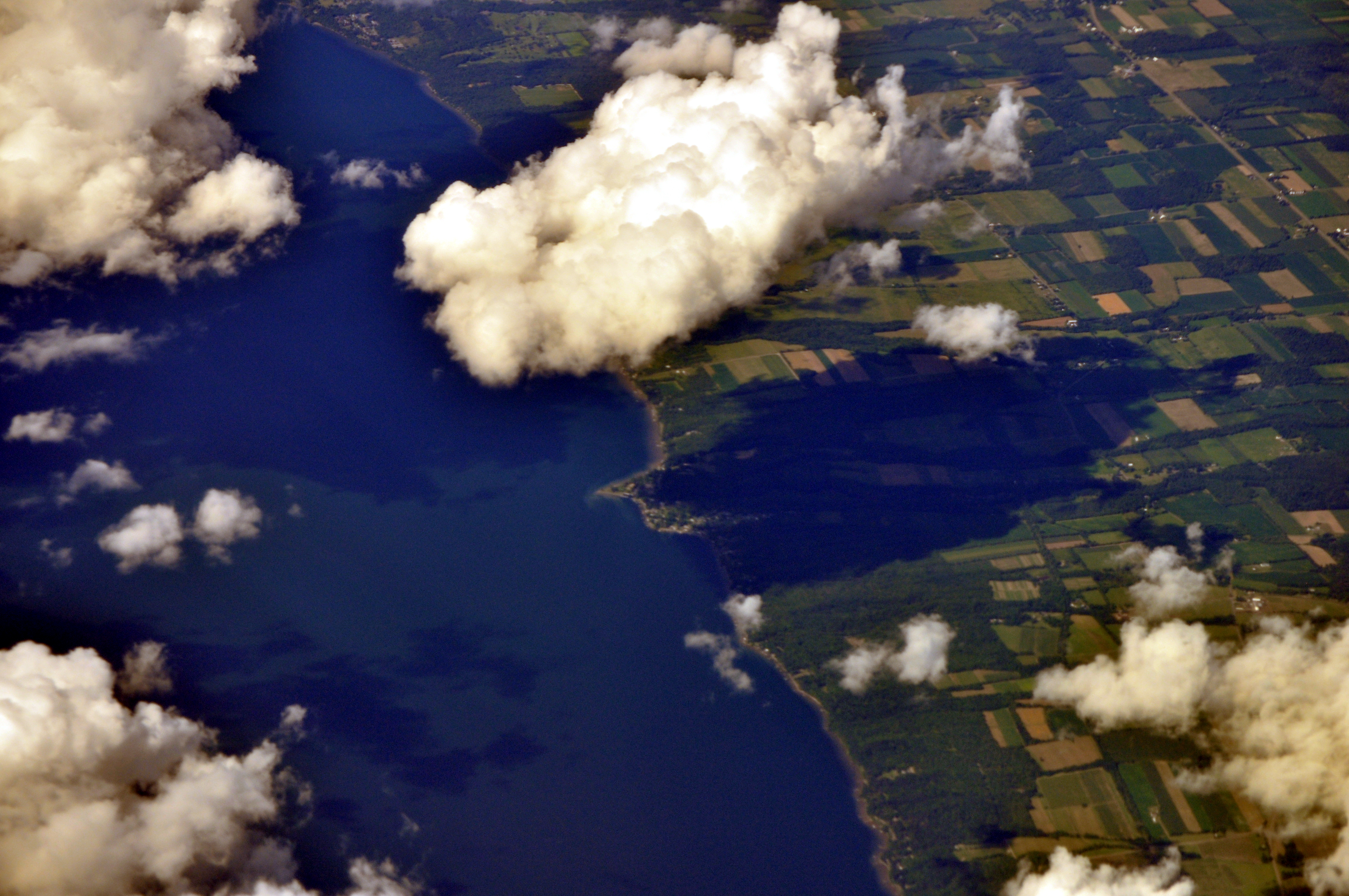
- Aerial view of Lodi Point State Park and environs from south by southwest, 2013. Lodi Point can be seen near the center of the photo.

- Location within New York
- Type: State park
- Location: Lower Lake Road; Lodi, New York
- Coordinates: 42°37′5.74″N 76°52′36.75″W
- Area: 12 acres (4.9 ha)
- Operator: New York State Office of Parks, Recreation and Historic Preservation
- Visitors: 32,693 (in 2014)
- Open: All year
- Website: Lodi Point State Park

Lodi Point State Park (also known as Lodi Point Marine Park) is a 12-acre (4.9 ha) state park in New York State, United States. The park is in the Town of Lodi in Seneca County. Lodi Point state park is on the east shore of Seneca Lake, one of the Finger Lakes.

The park is primarily a boating access point to Seneca Lake, lying west of the Village of Lodi. The park offers picnic tables, a playground with pavilions, a boat launch, and a marina.

== See also ==
- List of New York state parks
