= First Baptist Church of Interlaken =

Historic church in New York, United States

- U.S. National Register of Historic Places
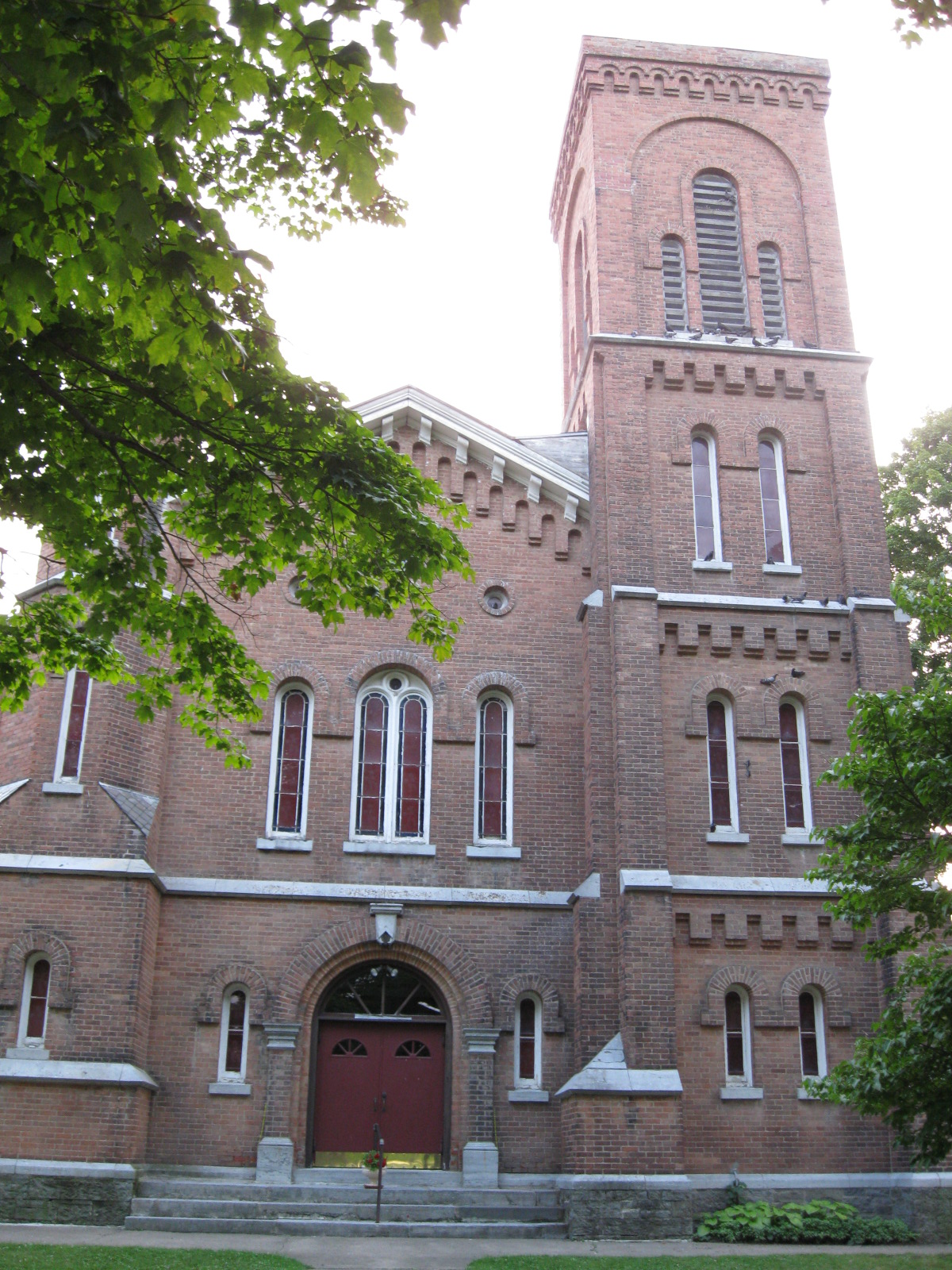
- First Baptist Church of Interlaken, August 2009

- Location within New York Location within the United States
- Location: 8414 Main St., Interlaken, New York
- Coordinates: 42°36′59″N 76°43′32″W
- Area: less than one acre
- Built: 1861
- Architect: White, Horatio Nelson
- Architectural style: Romanesque
- NRHP reference No.: 02001655
- Added to NRHP: December 31, 2002

First Baptist Church of Interlaken is a historic Baptist church located at Interlaken in Seneca County, New York. It was constructed in 1861 and is a brick and stone church with a vernacular Romanesque Revival style and decorative features. It features two irregular corner towers that convey an overall asymmetry to the edifice.

It was listed on the National Register of Historic Places in 2002.
