= New York State Route 96 =

State highway near Finger Lakes, New York, US

New York State Route 96
- NY 96 highlighted in red and NY 960H in blue

Route information
- Maintained by NYSDOT and the cities of Ithaca and Rochester
- Length: 126.01 mi (202.79 km)
- Existed: 1942–present

Major junctions
- South end: I-86 / NY 17 in Owego
- NY 13 / NY 34 / NY 79 in Ithaca; US 20 / NY 5 in Waterloo I-90 Toll / New York Thruway / NY 21 in Manchester; I-490 in Victor
- North end: East Main Street in Rochester

Location
- Country: United States
- State: New York
- Counties: Tioga, Tompkins, Seneca, Ontario, Monroe

Highway system
- New York Highways; Interstate; US; State; Reference; Parkways
← NY 95	→ NY 96A

New York State Route 96 (NY 96) is a 126.01-mile-long (202.79 km) northwest–southeast state highway in the Finger Lakes region of New York in the United States. The southern terminus of the route is at an interchange with I-86 in the Southern Tier village of Owego, Tioga County. Its northern terminus is at a junction with East Main Street in the city of Rochester, Monroe County. Between the two endpoints, NY 96 passes through the city of Ithaca and the villages of Waterloo, Victor, and Pittsford. NY 96 is signed north–south for its entire length, although most of the route in Ontario County travels in an east–west direction.

All of NY 96, except from Candor to Ithaca and from northwest of Victor to Pittsford, was originally designated as part of New York State Route 15 in 1924. NY 15 was originally routed on modern NY 96B between Candor and Ithaca, and modern NY 64 and NY 251 between Victor and Pittsford. It was realigned onto the modern alignment of NY 96 between Victor and Pittsford in 1930. NY 15 was renumbered to New York State Route 2 c. 1939 to eliminate duplication with U.S. Route 15 (US 15). NY 2 was subsequently redesignated as NY 96 in 1942 as the alignments of NY 2 and NY 96, a route in Rensselaer County, were swapped. NY 96 was realigned again in the early 1950s, this time between Candor and Ithaca, to serve the village of Spencer west of Candor. Near Rochester, NY 96 followed what is now Interstate 490 (I-490) for a short time during the 1950s and early 1960s. The 2017 route log erroneously shows that NY 96's northern terminus ends at Union Street. Whether by accident or as a prank, there is occasionally a route sign that was installed upside down. You can notice this when you see the white shield that surrounds the "96" with its point on the top.

== Route description ==
Most of NY 96's 125 miles (201 km) are maintained by the New York State Department of Transportation (NYSDOT); however, three sections of the route in Tompkins County and Monroe County are maintained by local highway departments. In the Tompkins County city of Ithaca, NY 96 is city-maintained from the southern city line to the start of the Fulton/Meadow Street one-way couplet, at which point maintenance of the highway reverts to NYSDOT. The route is also maintained by Ithaca from Park Road to the western city limits. The last locally owned section is in the Monroe County city of Rochester, where the entirety of NY 96 within the city is city-maintained.

=== Tioga County ===
NY 96 begins at the eastbound ramps for NY 17 at exit 64 on Southside Drive, across the Susquehanna River from the Tioga County village of Owego. The route follows Southside Drive until its intersection with Court Street, at the western terminus of NY 434. NY 434 continues east along Southside Drive, while NY 96 turns north onto Court Street and crosses the Susquehanna River. On the opposite side of the river, NY 96 intersects Front Street. The configuration of NY 96 between Front Street and East Main Street is unorthodox in that NY 96 splits at Front Street to follow a one-way couplet around the Tioga County Courthouse to Main Street, where both streets terminate. NY 96 turns onto Main Street for half a block to North Avenue, where it resumes its northward path. The route shares the parallel one-way streets with NY 17C, which enters Owego from the west via Main Street and leaves via Front Street to the east.

From NY 17 (Future I-86) to the split with NY 38 in Owego, NY 96 is signed with reference markers as NY 38, even though full signage for NY 96 appears just before the Court Street Bridge.

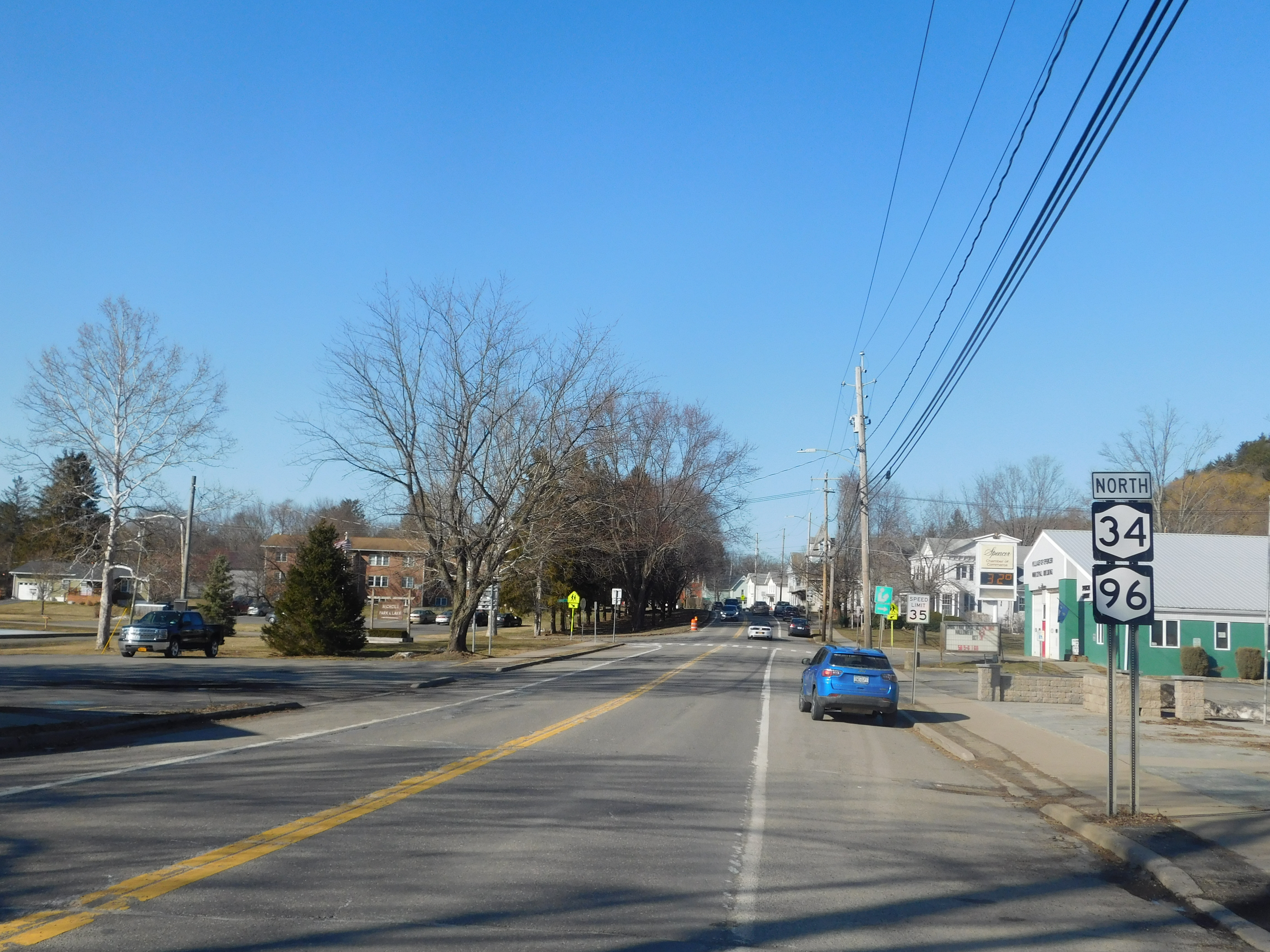
NY 34 and NY 96 northbound in Spencer

Now on North Avenue, NY 96 passes through the heart of Owego before leaving the village and following Owego Creek into a long stretch of rural country. Just over 1 mile (1.6 km) north of Owego village in the town of Owego, NY 96 meets the southern terminus of NY 38. At this point, NY 38 becomes the creekside highway while NY 96 passes over Owego Creek and follows Catatonk Creek northwest into the town of Candor. Once in Candor, the route and the creek turn northward toward the village of Candor, where NY 96 meets NY 96B, an alternate route of NY 96 between Candor and the city of Ithaca. Past NY 96B, NY 96 turns to the west and crosses over Catatonk Creek as it exits the village. West of Candor, NY 96 follows an east–west alignment through a creek valley to the village of Spencer, where the route converges with NY 34 and heads north into another valley leading to Tompkins County.

=== Tompkins County ===
The two routes remain concurrent as they snake to the northwest through Tompkins County. Southwest of the city of Ithaca in the town of Ithaca, NY 34 and NY 96 meet NY 13. The three routes continue northeast through the town, intersecting NY 327 and NY 13A before crossing over the inlet of Cayuga Lake and entering the city of Ithaca on Meadow Street. Here, NY 96B reconnects to its parent at the junction of Clinton and Meadow Streets. North of this point, Meadow Street splits into a one-way couplet, with Fulton Street carrying southbound traffic and Meadow Street handling northbound traffic. NY 79, also routed on a one-way couplet here, crosses NY 96 at Green and Seneca Streets, with NY 79 eastbound using one block of Fulton Street to travel from State Street to Green Street.

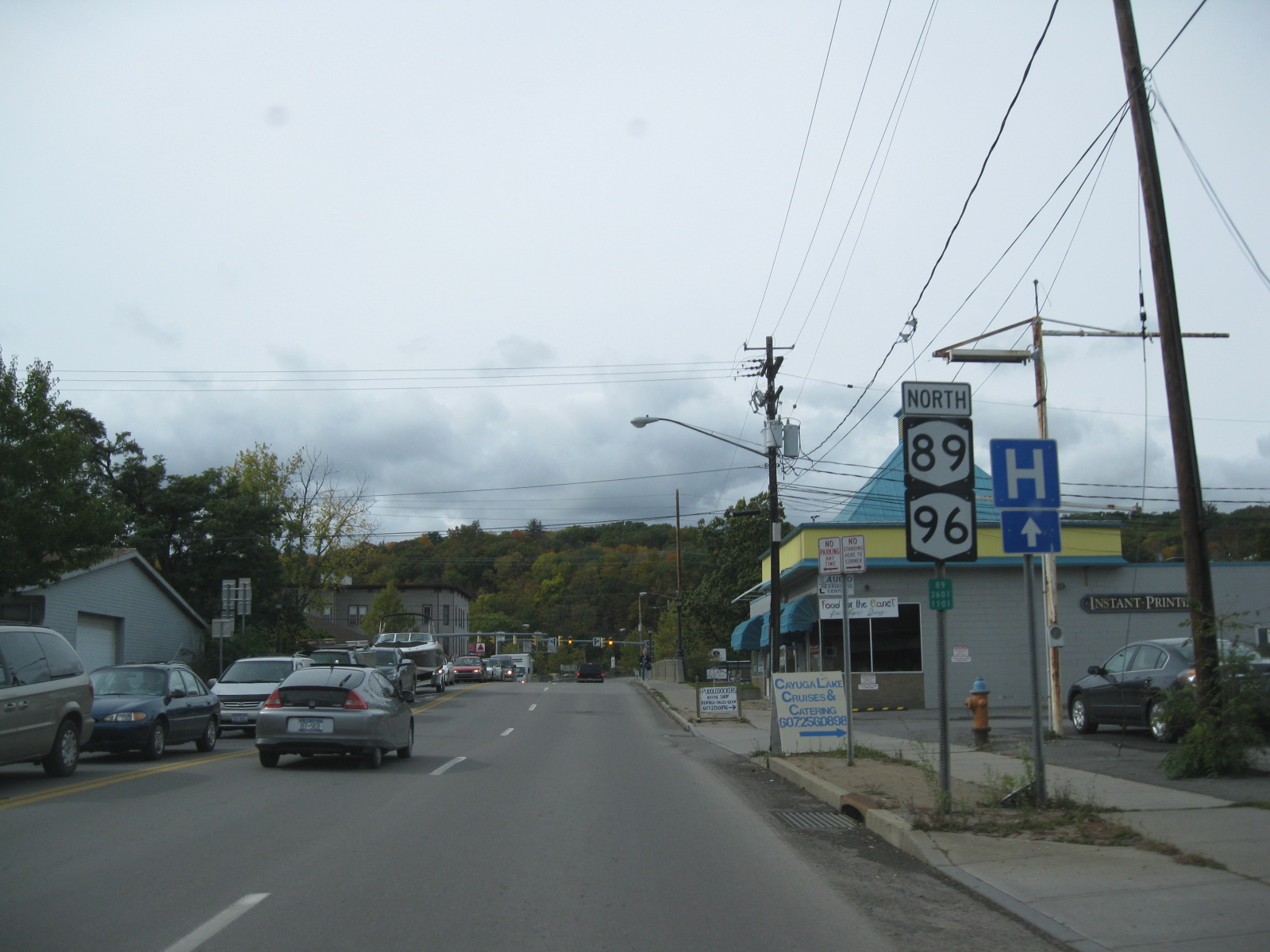
NY 89 and NY 96 northbound in Ithaca

One block north of NY 79, NY 96 splits from NY 13 and NY 34 and heads to the west at Buffalo Street. NY 89 begins here, and NY 96 overlaps with NY 89 toward the West End of Ithaca. After crossing southbound NY 13 and NY 34, NY 89 and NY 96 run parallel to and a few feet to the north of NY 79. NY 89 turns north onto Taughannock Boulevard at the next intersection while NY 96 continues west across the lake outlet as Cliff Street, paralleling NY 79. They do not intersect in this area—known locally as The Octopus—though they once did. At one time, NY 96, NY 79, NY 89, NY 13A and Elm Street met at an intersection that gave the area its name. Today, only NY 13A and NY 79 intersect there while the stub of former NY 89 is now a park access road that intersects with NY 96, which continues north out of the Cayuga Lake valley as Trumansburg Road.

Unlike NY 89, which runs along the base of the valley and parallels the west shore of Cayuga Lake, NY 96 heads away from the lake, increasing the distance between itself and the water body as it proceeds northwestward to the highlands overlooking the lake. The route heads across open fields and past isolated pockets of homes toward Trumansburg, where NY 96 crosses over Taughannock Creek and serves Taughannock Falls State Park southeast of the village. In Trumansburg itself, the highway becomes Main Street and meets the northern terminus of NY 227 in the center of the community. NY 96 continues on, exiting Trumansburg just 250 yards (229 m) before crossing the Seneca County line.

=== Seneca County ===
NY 96 proceeds northwest through a lightly populated section of Seneca County and the town of Covert to the village of Interlaken, home to the southern terminus of NY 96A, a more westerly alternate route of NY 96 between Interlaken and Geneva. Outside of the village, NY 96 continues on a northwesterly path for another 4.5 miles (7.2 km) to the Ovid–Romulus town line, where it turns due west for 2 miles (3.2 km) to access the village of Ovid. The route mostly bypasses the village, with NY 96A and NY 414 serving as its Main Street instead. The three routes meet at a junction on the northern fringe of the community, at which point NY 96A leaves NY 414 and turns west to follow the town line toward Seneca Lake while NY 96 joins NY 414 and heads north into the town of Romulus.

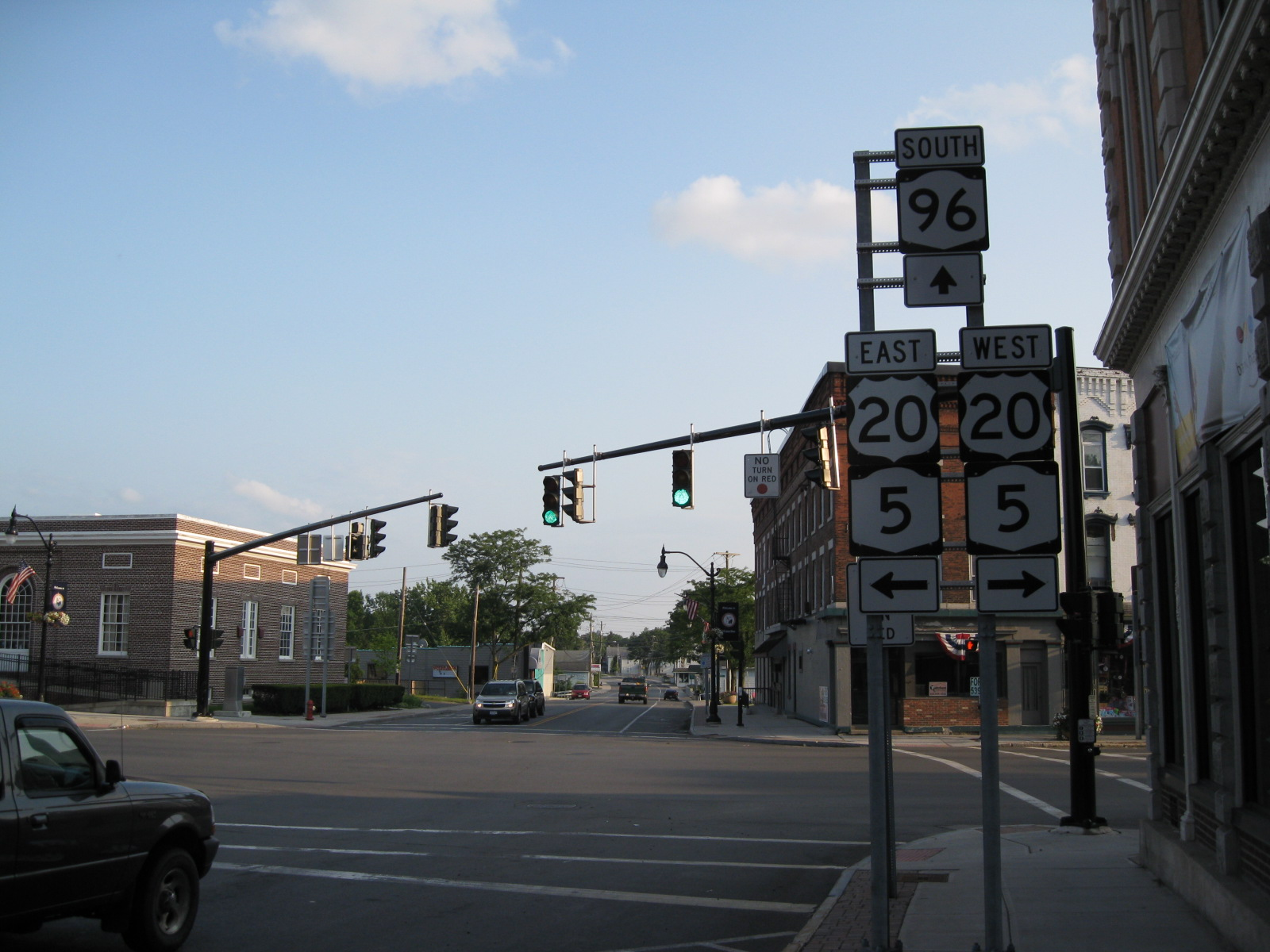
NY 96 southbound at US 20 and NY 5 in Waterloo

Midway between the village of Ovid and the hamlet of Romulus, the two routes split, allowing NY 414 to continue due north to Seneca Falls. NY 96, meanwhile, turns to the northwest, following the eastern edge of the Seneca Army Depot for most of the distance to Romulus hamlet. Just south of the community's center, NY 96 separates from the depot grounds and continues north through the hamlet and into the town of Varick. The route uneventfully crosses the town, passing by open fields on a predominantly northward alignment on its way to the Fayette town line and a junction with NY 336, an east–west connector between NY 96A and NY 414. NY 96 continues across rural terrain to the outskirts of the village of Waterloo, where the number of homes rises as the route enters the village on Fayette Street.

In the southern half of the village, the highway follows a zig-zag routing as it leaves Fayette Street at River Road before returning to the north at Washington Street one block to the east. While on Washington Street, the route passes over the Cayuga–Seneca Canal and enters the village's center, changing names to Virginia Street in the process. Not far to the north, NY 96 heads into Waterloo's central business district, built up around the junction of Virginia and Main (US 20 and NY 5) Streets. Past Routes 5 and 20, NY 96 continues north as a residential street to the village line, where the route turns to the west with a slight trend to the north. At this point, the scenery surrounding NY 96 shifts from house-lined streets to rural countryside once again, an appearance that follows the road to the northwest through the town of Waterloo and across the county line.

=== Ontario County ===
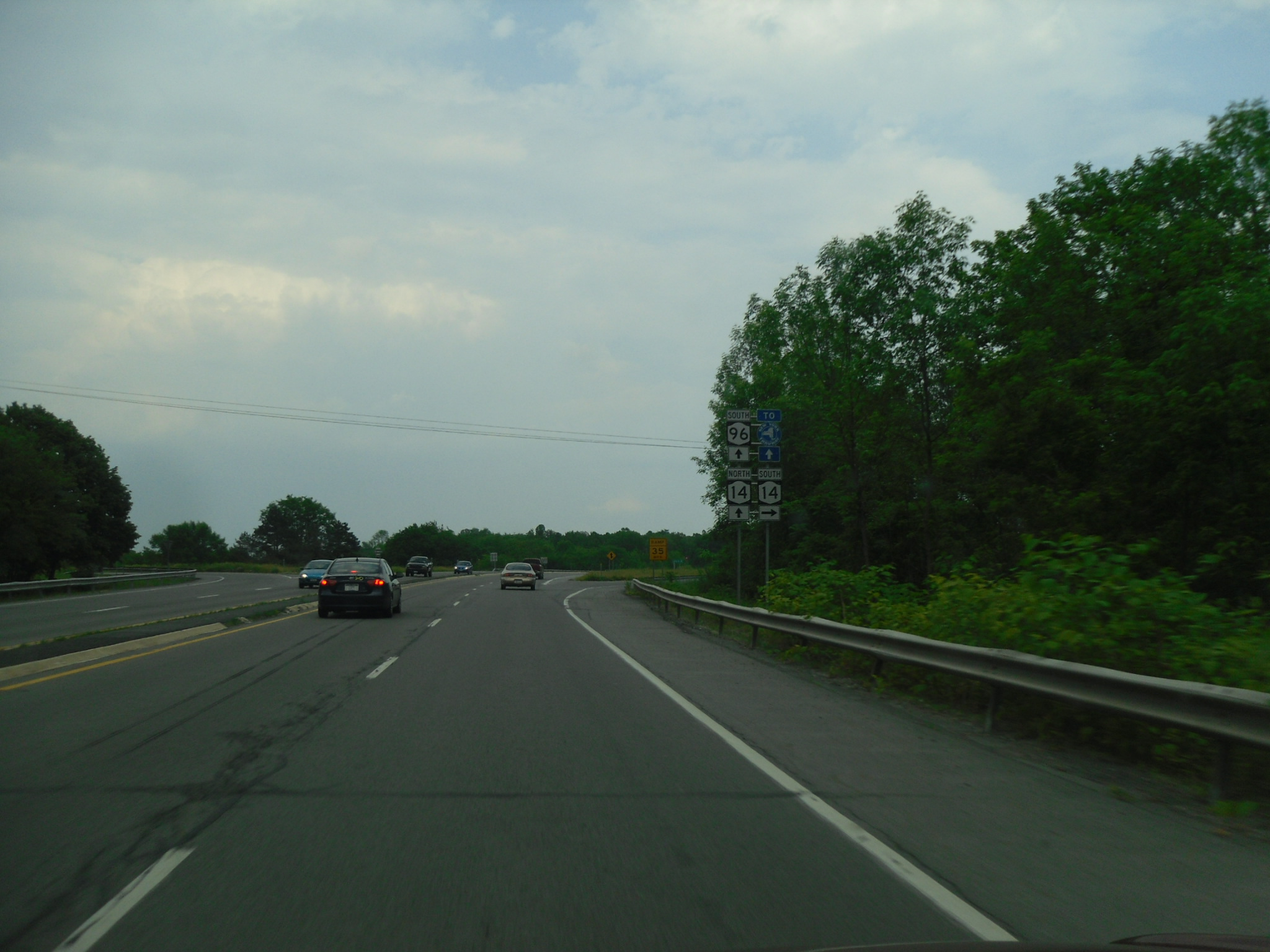
Approaching NY 14 on NY 96 south

Although NY 96 travels mostly in an east–west direction throughout Ontario County, it is still signed as a north–south highway. Less than 1 mile (1.6 km) into the county, NY 96 connects to NY 14 by way of a cloverleaf interchange. West of NY 14, NY 96 begins to parallel the paths of both the New York State Thruway (I-90) and the Canandaigua Lake outlet to the north. The highway follows both entities across the town of Phelps to the village of the same name, where NY 96 meets the southern terminus of NY 88. Just west of the village, NY 96 intersects the northern terminus of NY 488, formerly part of NY 88. West of the intersection, a northward reverse S-curve draws NY 96 closer to the Thruway and the outlet as the route heads toward the village of Clifton Springs, which NY 96 bypasses to the north.

4 miles (6 km) to the west in the village of Manchester, NY 96 crosses over the outlet (which roughly follows NY 21 south to Canandaigua Lake from this point out) and indirectly connects to the Thruway by way of a junction with NY 21 located north of the village center and just south of where NY 21 meets the Thruway at exit 43. West of NY 21, NY 96 curves gently to the south, crossing the Ontario Central Railroad before resuming its westward alignment near the grade crossing. At this point, NY 96 enters the town of Farmington and begins to parallel the Thruway once more. The route passes by Finger Lakes Gaming and Race Track, located between County Route 8 (CR 8) and NY 332, prior to intersecting NY 332 itself 0.5 miles (0.8 km) west of the race track.

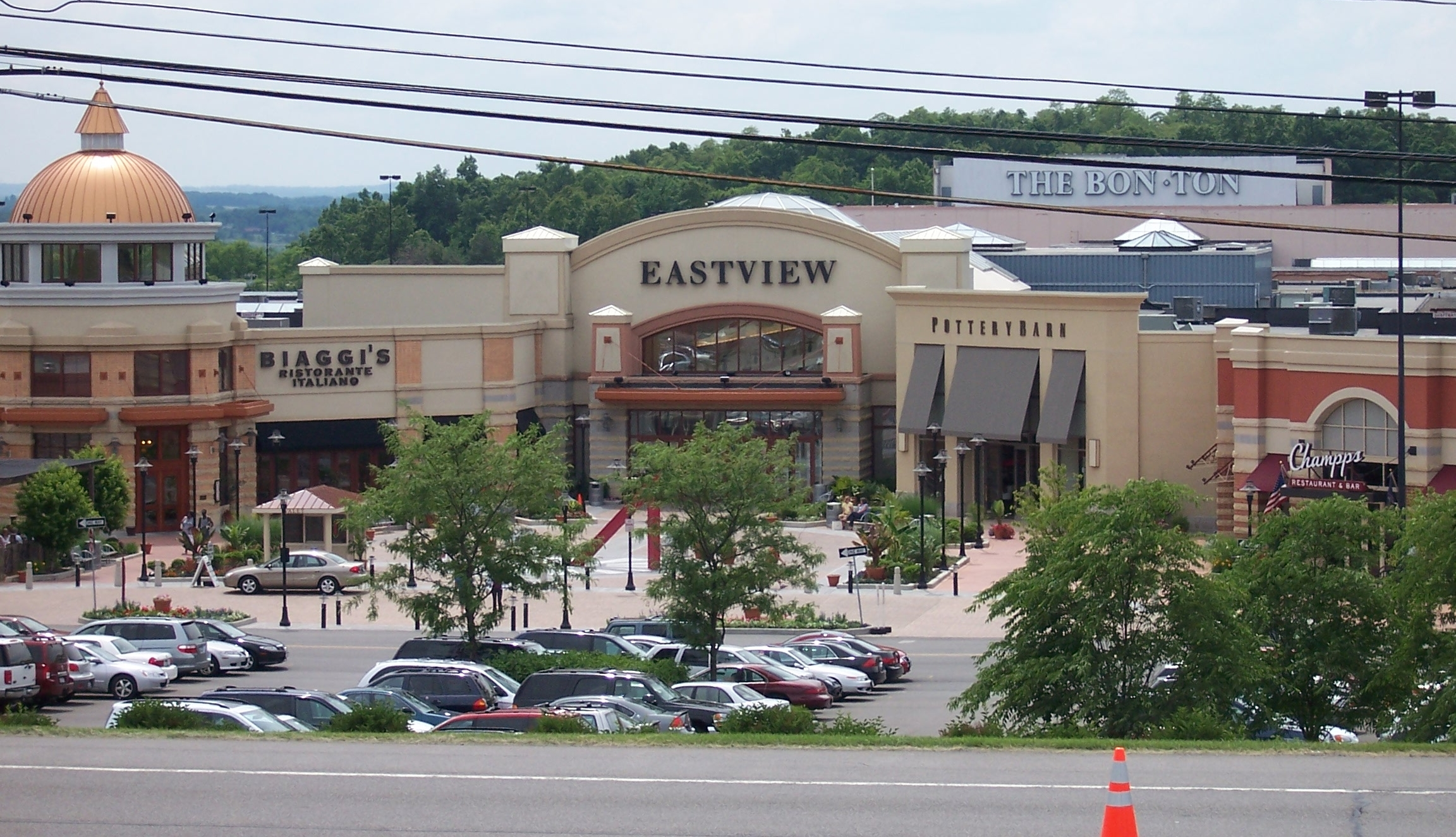
Eastview Mall, with NY 96 at bottom

From this point northwestward to Rochester, NY 96 passes through substantially more developed areas. The first of these is the nearby village of Victor, which NY 96 enters by way of an overpass carrying it over the Ontario Central Railroad. In the village itself, the route meets the northern terminus of NY 444, which travels north–south between Victor and Bloomfield. West of the village in the town of Victor, NY 96 runs along the base of a valley separating it from the Thruway, where it intersects the eastern terminus of NY 251. The route continues on a northwesterly track for another mile (1.6 km) before curving to the north and widening from two to four lanes as it passes under the Thruway near exit 45. I-490, which begins at Thruway exit 45, is accessible from NY 96 by way of exit 29, the easternmost exit on I-490.

The section of NY 96 between exit 29 and NY 250 in Perinton serves as a major commercial strip, anchored by the presence of Eastview Mall, one of the largest malls in the Rochester area and the largest east of the city. Also present along this stretch of NY 96 are a series of plazas, beginning with one just north of I-490 featuring a Walmart and a Kohl's. Continuing northward, NY 96 runs along the eastern edge of Eastview Mall and passes two more plazas. The highway gradually turns northwest toward the county line as it passes the mall, and crosses into Monroe County at an intersection leading to Eastview Commons, a plaza separated from the mall by high-voltage power lines and a large ditch.

=== Monroe County ===
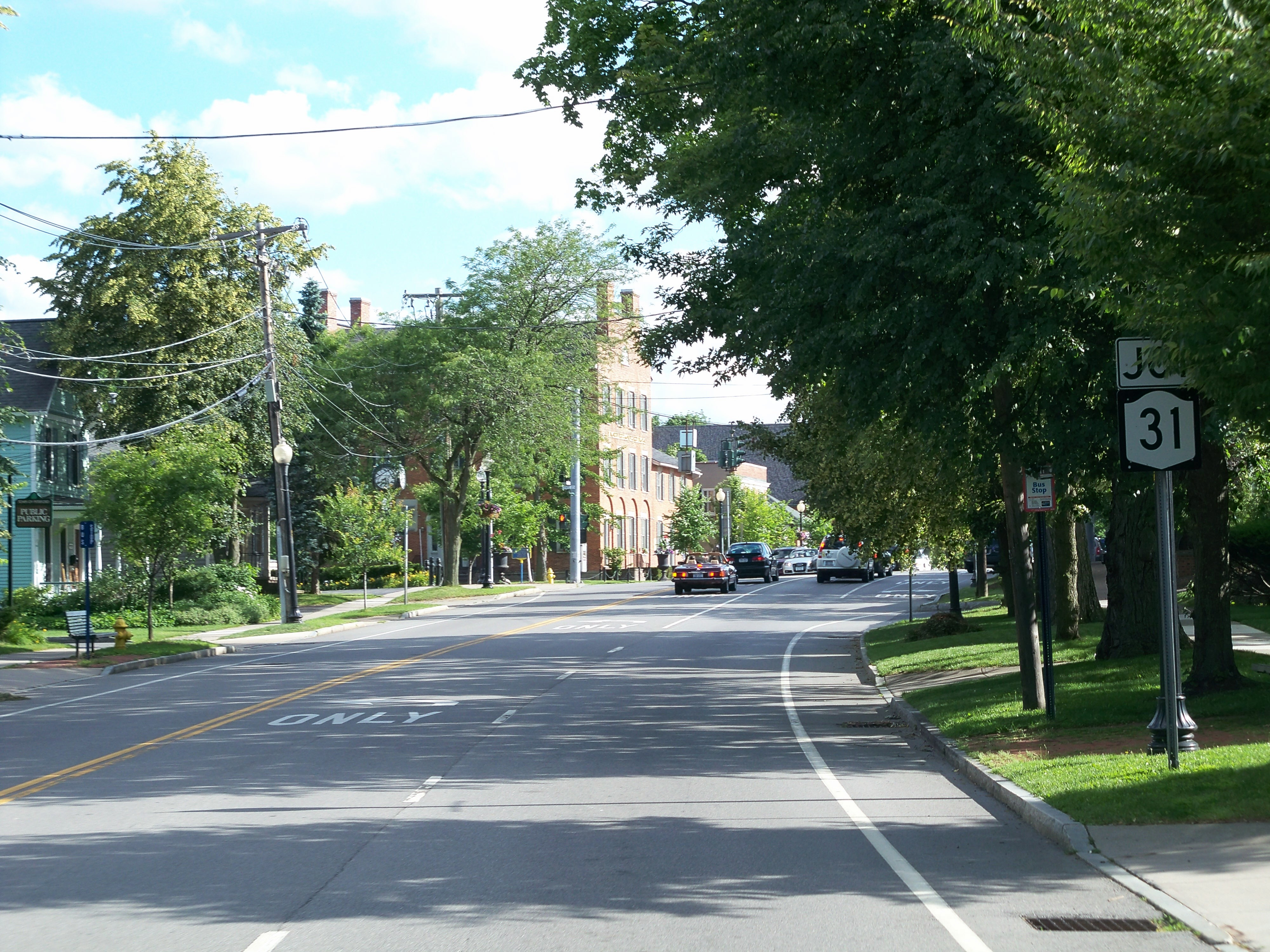
Entering Pittsford and approaching NY 31 on NY 96 southbound

Roughly a quarter of a mile (0.4 km) from the county line, the commercial surroundings end as NY 96 intersects the southern terminus of NY 250 in the town of Perinton. 0.75 miles (1.21 km) to the northwest, NY 96 meets I-490 once again, this time at exit 28. West of the exit, NY 96 parallels I-490 for roughly 1.25 miles (2.01 km), serving several office parks and Powder Mills Park before reconnecting to the freeway at exit 27, located on the southern edge of Bushnell's Basin, a small hamlet located directly on NY 96. North of the exit, NY 96 breaks from I-490 and parallels the Erie Canal's Great Embankment through slightly less developed areas between Bushnell's Basin and Mitchell Road in the town of Pittsford, where it narrows to two lanes and becomes East Jefferson Road.

West of Mitchell Road, NY 96 takes a more southerly alignment than the canal as it enters the densely populated village of Pittsford and meets the northern and eastern termini of NY 64 and NY 252, respectively, at the intersection of Jefferson Road and South Main Street. NY 64 heads to the south along South Main Street and NY 252 continues along Jefferson Road to the west while NY 96 turns north, proceeding into the heart of the village along South Main Street. In the village center, NY 96 intersects Monroe Avenue and State Street, which carry NY 31 east–west through Pittsford. The route continues on, becoming North Main Street as it crosses the Erie Canal and passes under the CSX Transportation-owned West Shore Subdivision. Just north of the railroad overpass is a junction with the southern terminus of NY 153, the most direct route between Pittsford and nearby East Rochester.

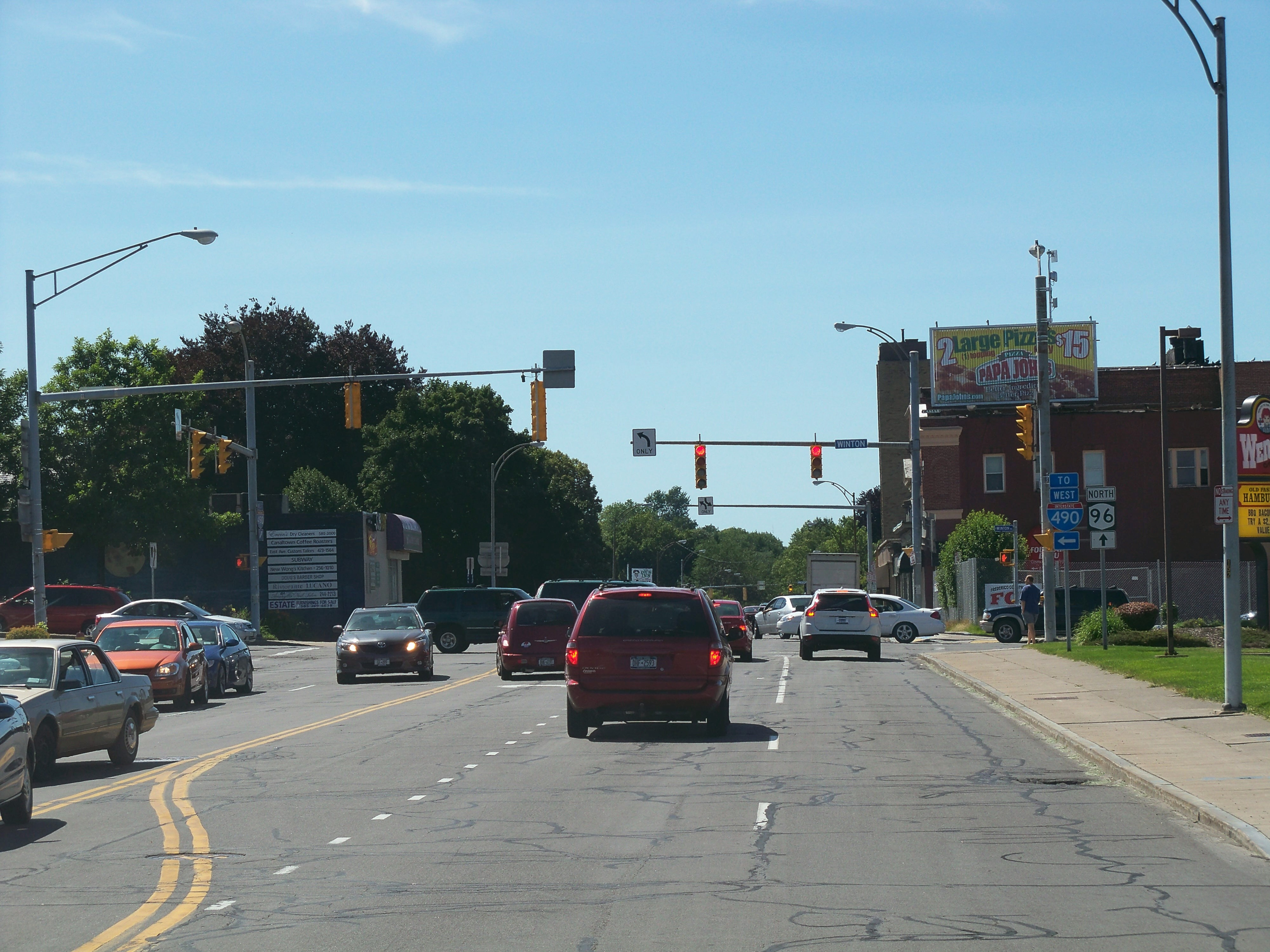
The last NY 96 marker heading northbound at Winton Road in Rochester

Past NY 153, NY 96 exits the village of Pittsford and becomes East Avenue, a name the route retains to its terminus in downtown Rochester. It proceeds northward through the heavily residential town, passing by Nazareth College and meeting the western terminus of NY 31F (Fairport Road) at a junction adjacent to the campus of St. John Fisher University. East Avenue, and likewise NY 96, takes on the northwesterly, four-lane alignment set by Fairport Road and begins to parallel the routing of I-490 once more as both enter the town of Brighton. Not far to the northwest of the town line, NY 96 meets Elmwood and Linden Avenues, the latter carrying NY 441. About 1 mile (1.6 km) to the northwest, NY 96 intersects Penfield Road, the pre-expressway alignment of NY 441. One block from this point is Clover Street, which carries NY 65 south of East Avenue.

At the Brighton town–Rochester city line, NY 96 passes through the center of the Can of Worms, a complex interchange that links I-490 to I-590. Here, I-590 passes under NY 96 while I-490 flies over NY 96. On the other side of the interchange in Rochester, East Avenue becomes a commercial strip once again, but to a lesser extent than in Victor. At North Winton Road, NY 96 is signed for the last time by way of a "North 96" reassurance assembly directing traffic to stay on East Avenue. Despite this fact, the route officially continues northwestward toward downtown Rochester.

West of Winton, NY 96 passes through the East Avenue Historic District, a primarily residential area with historic upper-class houses, including the George Eastman House. This stretch of the route was narrowed in mid-2010 from four lanes to two, to improve the residential feel and reduce automobile speeds. At Alexander Street, the environment turns more commercial as the route enters the downtown area. After crossing Union Street, the route passes the Little Theatre before terminating at a Y-junction with East Main Street.

== History ==
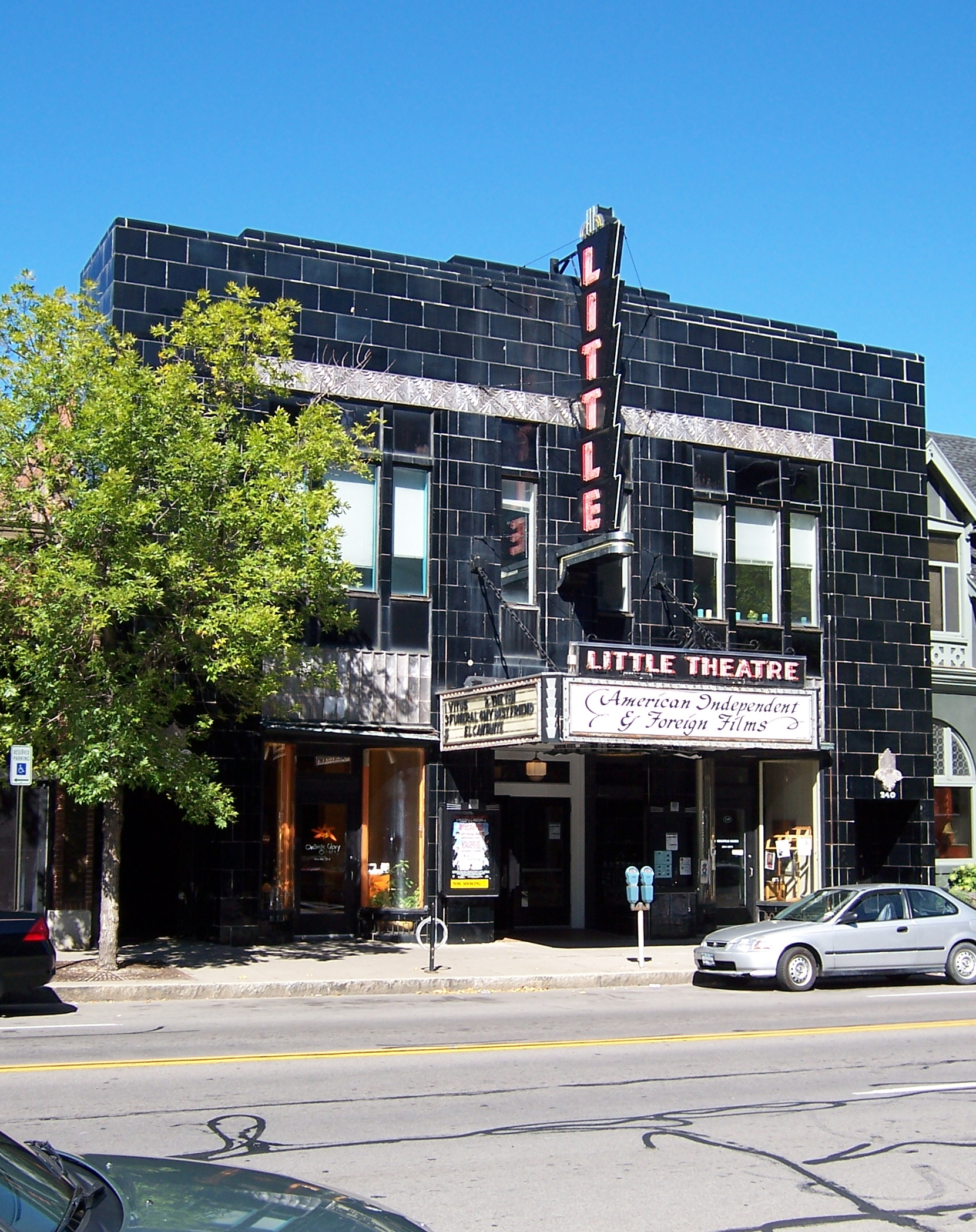
The Little Theatre on East Avenue (NY 96) in Rochester

In 1908, the New York State Legislature created Route 36, an unsigned legislative route that extended from Owego to Seneca Falls via Candor, Ithaca, and Ovid. South of Romulus, Route 36 utilized what is now NY 96 and NY 96B. When the first set of posted routes in New York were assigned in 1924, the Owego–Interlaken and Ovid–Romulus portions of legislative Route 36 became part of NY 15, which began in Owego and proceeded northwest from Romulus to Rochester by way of Waterloo, Phelps, Victor, Mendon, and Pittsford. From Mendon to Rochester, NY 15 followed the path of legislative Route 14, another highway dating back to 1908 that continued south from Mendon on what is now NY 64 and used Monroe Avenue between Pittsford and Rochester. Another section of NY 15—from the village of Phelps east to NY 14—utilized what had been designated as part of legislative Route 6-a from 1911 to 1921.

By 1926, NY 31 was assigned across western and central New York, utilizing Monroe Avenue from downtown Rochester to Pittsford. Although NY 96's modern routing via East Avenue was state-maintained and formerly part of legislative Route 20 from current NY 31F westward, NY 15 initially remained on Monroe Avenue, creating an overlap between NY 15 and NY 31. It was realigned at some point between 1927 and 1932 to follow East Avenue to Rochester instead. In southern Seneca County, NY 15 initially passed through Lodi on its way from Interlaken to Ovid. It was realigned in the late 1920s to bypass Lodi to the northeast on the former alignment of legislative Route 36.

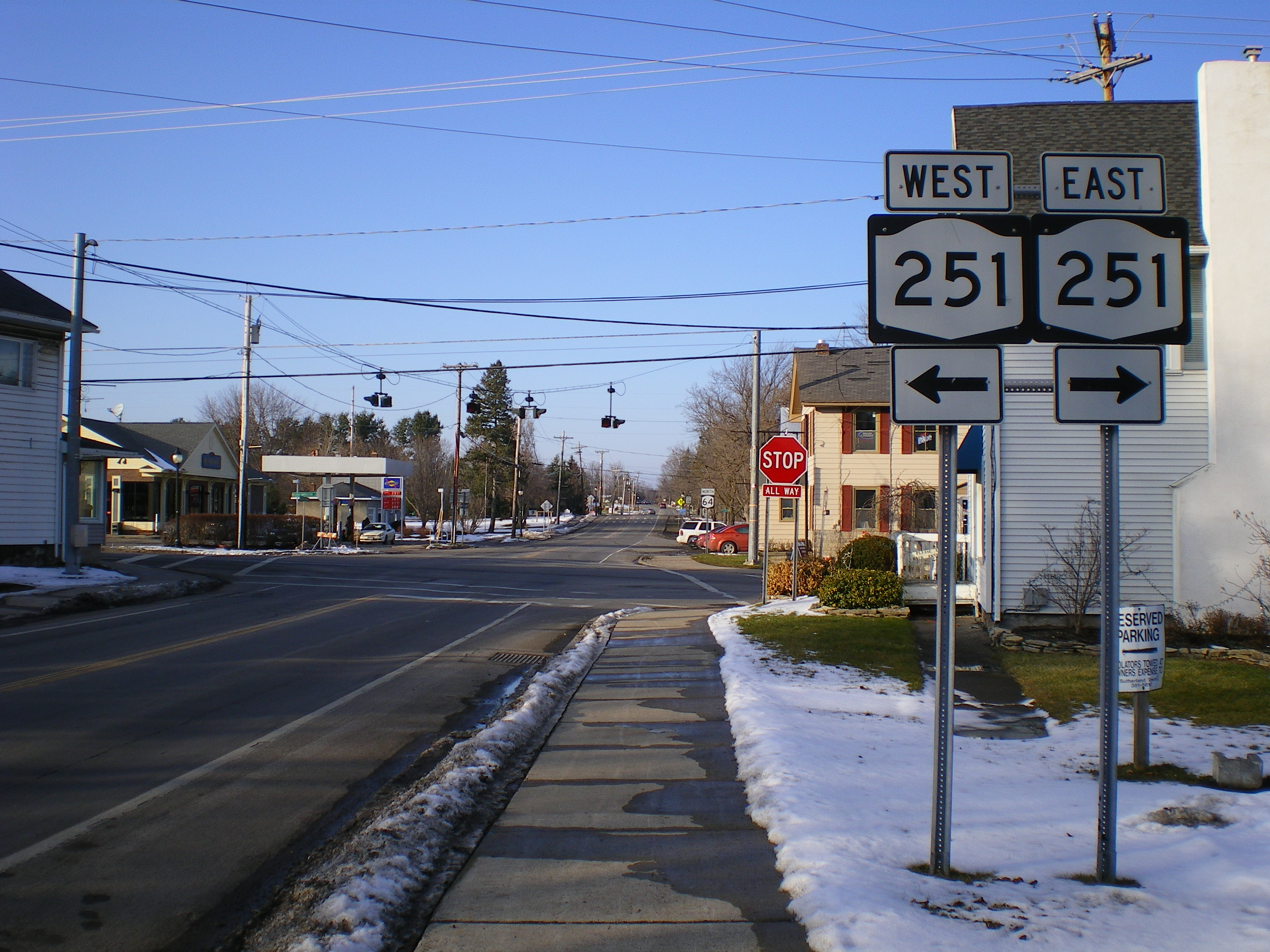
The junction of NY 64 and NY 251 in Mendon. Prior to 1930, NY 15 entered this intersection from the east (right) and left to the north (straight).

In the 1930 renumbering of state highways in New York, NY 15 basically remained intact. The only change made at this time was the straightening out of the Victor–Pittsford segment, which now bypassed Mendon in favor of a more direct alignment between the two villages via Bushnell's Basin. The former alignment of NY 15 became part of NY 251 east of Mendon and part of NY 64 north of the hamlet. US 15 was extended into New York c. 1939; it replaced NY 2, which had extended from the Pennsylvania state line to Rochester. NY 15 was renumbered to NY 2 to eliminate numerical duplication with the U.S. Highway.

The NY 96 designation was originally assigned to present-day NY 2 from NY 7 in Troy to Route 2 at the Massachusetts state line. In 1942, the alignments of NY 2 and NY 96 were swapped, placing NY 96 on the Owego–Rochester routing. The only major change to NY 96 since that time came in the early 1950s, when the route was realigned between Candor and Ithaca to follow a new routing via Spencer. The Candor–Spencer portion of the alignment had been part of NY 53 during the 1920s and part of NY 223 since 1930. NY 223 was truncated to its current eastern terminus at NY 224 near Van Etten as part of NY 96's realignment. Between Spencer and Ithaca, NY 96 overlapped with NY 34, which had occupied that segment of highway since the 1930 renumbering.

In the 1950s, NY 96 was temporarily moved onto the Eastern Expressway as sections of the freeway opened to traffic. The first section extended from Bushnell's Basin to NY 31F and opened to traffic in November 1955, at which time NY 96 was routed onto the new highway and NY 252 and NY 64 were extended eastward and northward, respectively, to cover NY 96's old surface alignment. NY 31F, meanwhile, was truncated to begin at the expressway. A northwest extension to what is now the Can of Worms was completed c. 1957 as a realignment of NY 96, resulting in the re-extension of NY 31F to its original terminus and an extension of NY 64 along East Avenue to the eastern edge of Rochester. NY 64, NY 96, and NY 252 were restored to their pre-1950s alignments c. 1961 when the freeway was designated as I-490.

== Suffixed routes ==
- NY 96A (26.94 miles or 43.36 kilometres) is an alternate route of NY 96 in Seneca County. The route splits from NY 96 in Interlaken and terminates at US 20 and NY 5 east of Geneva in Waterloo. It was assigned in the early 1940s.
- NY 96B (19.56 miles or 31.48 kilometres) is an alternate route of NY 96 between Candor, Tioga County, and Ithaca, Tompkins County. The route was assigned in November 1952.

== Major intersections ==
County	Location	mi	km	Destinations	Notes
Tioga	Village of Owego	0.00	0.00	I-86 east / NY 17 east – Binghamton	Southern terminus; exit 64 on I-86
Tioga	Village of Owego	0.58	0.93	NY 434 east to I-86 west / NY 17 west – Elmira	Western terminus of NY 434
Tioga	Village of Owego	0.86	1.38	NY 17C east	Southern terminus of NY 17C overlap
Tioga	Village of Owego	0.98	1.58	NY 17C west	Northern terminus of NY 17C overlap
Tioga	Town of Owego	2.72	4.38	NY 38 north – Newark Valley, Richford	Southern terminus of NY 38
Tioga	Village of Candor	10.62	17.09	NY 96B north – Ithaca	Southern terminus of NY 96B
Tioga	Village of Candor	11.32	18.22	Mill Street (NY 960H north)	Southern terminus of unsigned NY 960H; former NY 96B
Tioga	Village of Spencer	19.58	31.51	NY 34 south – Waverly, Tioga County, Watkins Glen	Southern terminus of NY 34 overlap
Tompkins	Town of Ithaca	33.53	53.96	NY 13 south – Elmira	Southern terminus of NY 13 overlap
Tompkins	Town of Ithaca	34.03	54.77	NY 327 north (Enfield Falls Road) – Robert H. Treman State Park	Southern terminus of NY 327
Tompkins	Town of Ithaca	35.10	56.49	NY 13A north (Five Mile Drive)	Southern terminus of NY 13A
Tompkins	City of Ithaca	37.21	59.88	NY 96B south (West Clinton Street) – Ithaca College	Northern terminus of NY 96B
Tompkins	City of Ithaca	37.31	60.04	NY 79 east (West Green Street) – Downtown, Cornell University	Southern terminus of NY 79 overlap (southbound)
Tompkins	City of Ithaca	37.43	60.24	NY 79 west (West Seneca Street)	Northern terminus of NY 79 overlap (southbound)
Tompkins	City of Ithaca	37.51	60.37	NY 13 north / NY 34 north (West Buffalo Street) NY 89 begins	Northern terminus of NY 13 / NY 34 overlap; southern terminus of NY 89
Tompkins	City of Ithaca	37.71	60.69	NY 89 north (Taughannock Road)	Northern terminus of NY 89 overlap
Tompkins	Trumansburg	48.51	78.07	NY 227 south – Watkins Glen	Northern terminus of NY 227
Seneca	Interlaken	55.05	88.59	NY 96A west – Lodi	Eastern terminus of NY 96A
Seneca	Village of Ovid	62.61	100.76	NY 96A / NY 414 south – Sampson State Park, Geneva, Watkins Glen	Southern terminus of NY 414 overlap
Seneca	Romulus	65.11	104.78	NY 414 north – Seneca Falls	Northern terminus of NY 414 overlap
Seneca	Varick–Fayette town line	71.71	115.41	NY 336	
Seneca	Village of Waterloo	78.59	126.48	US 20 / NY 5	
Ontario	Town of Phelps	85.69	137.90	NY 14 to I-90 Toll / New York Thruway – Geneva, Lyons	Cloverleaf interchange
Ontario	Village of Phelps	90.85	146.21	NY 88 north	Southern terminus of NY 88
Ontario	Town of Phelps	91.88	147.87	NY 488 south	Northern terminus of NY 488
Ontario	Town of Manchester	98.98	159.29	I-90 Toll / New York Thruway / NY 21 – Manchester, Canandaigua, Palmyra	Exit 43 on I-90 / Thruway
Ontario	Farmington	105.62	169.98	NY 332 to I-90 Toll / New York Thruway – Canandaigua	
Ontario	Village of Victor	108.56	174.71	NY 444 south	Northern terminus of NY 444
Ontario	Town of Victor	109.92	176.90	NY 251 west – Mendon	Eastern terminus of NY 251
Ontario	Town of Victor	111.75	179.84	I-490 to I-90 Toll / New York Thruway – Rochester	Exit 29 on I-490; I-490 east not signed
Monroe	Perinton	113.32	182.37	NY 250 north – Fairport	Southern terminus of NY 250
Monroe	Perinton	114.03	183.51	I-490 west	No southbound exit; exit 28 on I-490
Monroe	Perinton	115.32	185.59	I-490 – Rochester	Exit 27 on I-490
Monroe	Village of Pittsford	118.44	190.61	NY 64 south / NY 252 west	Northern terminus of NY 64; eastern terminus of NY 252
Monroe	Village of Pittsford	118.77	191.14	NY 31	
Monroe	Village of Pittsford	119.09	191.66	NY 153 north	Southern terminus of NY 153
Monroe	Town of Pittsford	120.61	194.10	NY 31F east – East Rochester, Fairport	Western terminus of NY 31F
Monroe	Brighton	121.62	195.73	NY 441 east to I-490	Western terminus of NY 441
Monroe	Brighton			To I-490 west	Access via Penfield Road
Monroe	Brighton	122.52	197.18	NY 65 south	Northern terminus of NY 65
Monroe	Brighton–Rochester town/city line	122.94– 123.39	197.85– 198.58	I-490	Can of Worms; exit 21 on I-490
Monroe	Rochester	126.01	202.79	East Main Street	Northern terminus
Monroe	1.000 mi = 1.609 km; 1.000 km = 0.621 mi: Concurrency terminus; Incomplete access				
