= Covert Historic District =

Historic district in New York, United States

- U.S. National Register of Historic Places
- U.S. Historic district
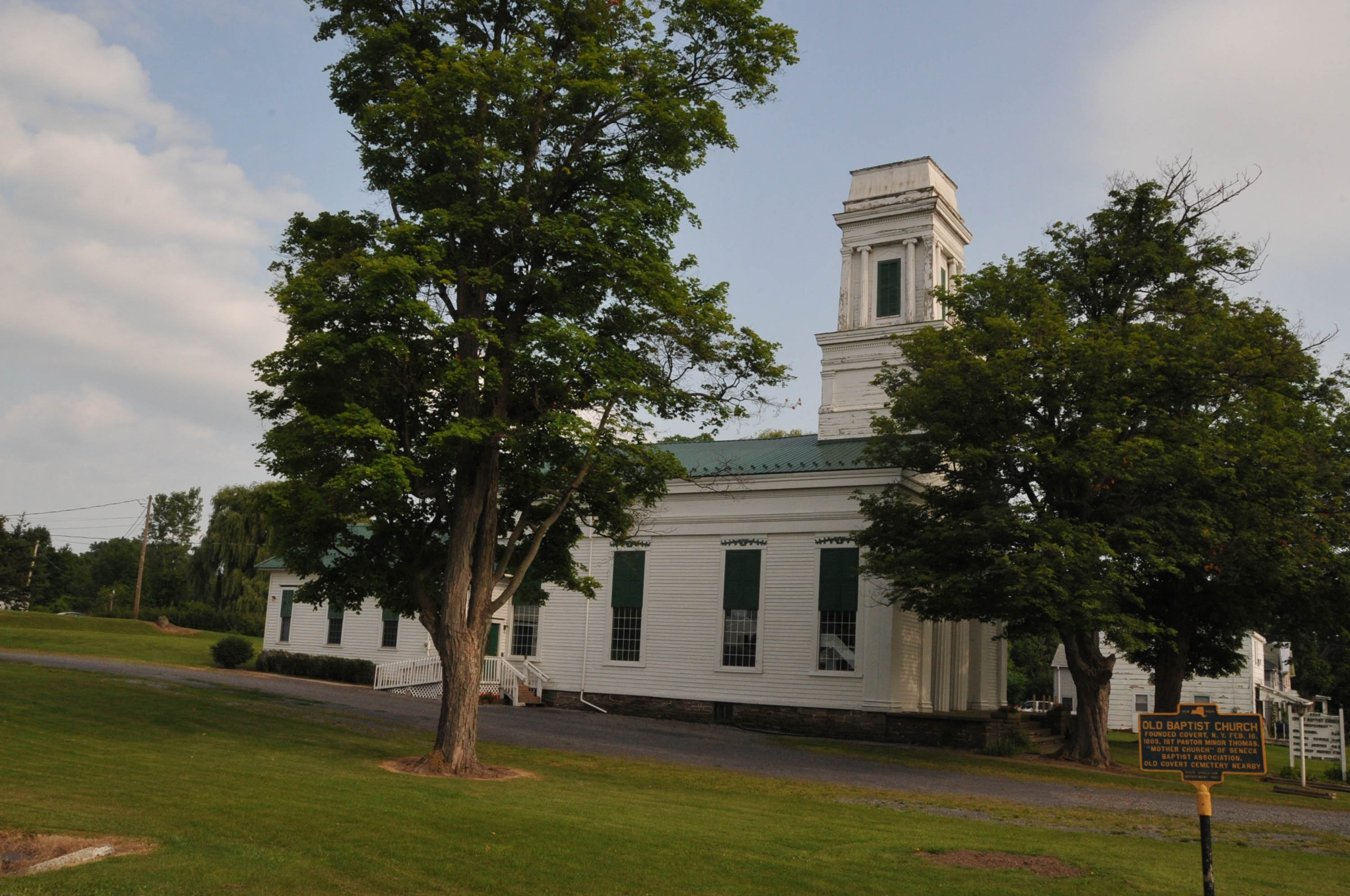
- Baptist church

- Location within New York Location within the United States
- Location: NY 96, Covert, New York
- Coordinates: 42°34′22″N 76°41′1″W
- Area: 0.4 acres (0.16 ha)
- Architectural style: Greek Revival, Gothic Revival, Federal
- NRHP reference No.: 80002766
- Added to NRHP: November 21, 1980

Covert Historic District is a national historic district located at Covert in Seneca County, New York. The district includes 21 properties located in the hamlet of Covert. The district is primarily residential and structures represent a variety of functions and styles spanning the period from 1810 to 1920. The earliest structure was built as a tavern and it also includes the Town Hall, First Baptist Church (and cemetery), a modest schoolhouse, and Grange Meeting Hall.

It was listed on the National Register of Historic Places in 1980.
