= Lodi, New York =

- Town
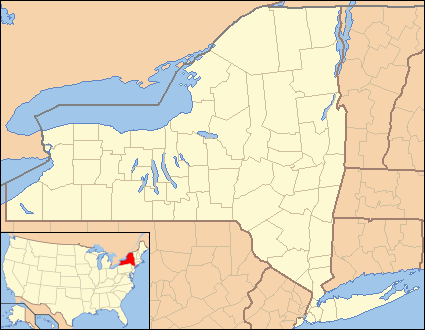
- Location within the state of New York
- Coordinates: 42°36′48″N 076°49′27″W
- Country: United States
- State: New York
- County: Seneca
- Settled: 1789
- Established: January 27, 1826

Government
  - Type: Town Board
  - Supervisor: Kyle Barnhart
  - Clerk: Connie Rosbaugh
  - Court: Justice Louis VanCleef (Ovid & Lodi town courts)

Area
  - Total: 39.76 sq mi (102.99 km^{2})
  - Land: 34.19 sq mi (88.55 km^{2})
  - Water: 5.58 sq mi (14.44 km^{2})
- Elevation: 1,161 ft (354 m)

Population (2020)
  - Total: 1,469 ▼
  - Estimate (2021): 1,461
  - Density: 45.0/sq mi (17.36/km^{2})
- Time zone: UTC-5 (Eastern (EST))
  - Summer (DST): UTC-4 (EDT)
- ZIP code: 14860
- Area code: 607
- FIPS code: 36-43225
- GNIS feature ID: 0979166
- Website: www.lodiny.com

Lodi (/ˈloʊdaɪ/ LOH-dye) is a town in Seneca County, New York, United States. The population was 1,469 at the 2020 census.

The Town of Lodi is in the southwest part of the county and is northwest of Ithaca, New York. The town contains a village also named Lodi. Both owe their names to the Italian city of Lodi.

== History ==
The area was occupied by members of the Seneca tribe until 1779 when the Sullivan Expedition destroyed their villages, including a Seneca orchard at Lodi Point. The town became part of the Central New York Military Tract. The first settler arrived around 1789.

Silas Halsey arrived at Cooley’s Point in 1792 with an enslaved person. He constructed a cabin. In 1794, Halsey built Seneca County’s first sawmill.

In 1799, in the area of Brokaw Road, a group of New Jersey Dutch farmers settled to form a Dutch Reformed community, eventually having two churches. Remnants of one of these churches is the McNeil Cemetery located in the area of Brokaw Road. The New Jersey Dutch settled into the area for several generations and eventually their churches combined with several other churches to form the United Presbyterian Church of Lodi. Descendants of these original Dutchmen reside in the town today.

In 1826, Lodi was set apart from the Town of Covert. The town's post office was established in 1820 and originally used the town name "De Mott's Corners" (after the town's postmaster and shopkeeper) before officially changing to "Lodi" in 1829. It initially shared the "Lodi" name with a community in what is now Collins, New York (which was known as "West Lodi" to differentiate the two) before that community changed its name to Gowanda.

The steamboat Seneca Chief is believed to have stopped at Lodi Point in 1828 during its inaugural voyage. After 1828, Lodi Point became a frequent stop for both passenger and freight steamboats traveling across Seneca Lake. Several warehouses were constructed at Lodi Point to handle items such as coal, lime, salt, lumber, groceries, and grain. By 1905, the commercial businesses at Lodi Point had disappeared, but steamboat service continued into the early 20th century.

The Queen's Castle was listed on the National Register of Historic Places in 1999.

== Geography ==
According to the United States Census Bureau, the town has a total area of 39.8 square miles (103.1 km^{2}), of which 34.2 square miles (88.6 km^{2}) is land and 5.6 square miles (14.5 km^{2}) (13.76%) is water.

The west town line, delineated by Seneca Lake is the border of Yates County, and the south town line is the border of Schuyler County. The town is in the Finger Lakes District of New York.

Located on the Eastern shore of Seneca Lake, Lodi is home to award-winning vineyards and accompanying wineries.

New York State Route 96A intersects New York State Route 414 at the Village of Lodi.

== Demographics ==
Historical population
Census	Pop.	Note	%±
1830	1,786		—
1840	2,236		25.2%
1850	2,269		1.5%
1860	2,067		−8.9%
1870	1,825		−11.7%
1880	1,947		6.7%
1890	1,694		−13.0%
1900	1,636		−3.4%
1910	1,408		−13.9%
1920	1,137		−19.2%
1930	1,044		−8.2%
1940	1,051		0.7%
1950	1,118		6.4%
1960	1,267		13.3%
1970	1,287		1.6%
1980	1,184		−8.0%
1990	1,429		20.7%
2000	1,476		3.3%
2010	1,550		5.0%
2020	1,469		−5.2%
2021 (est.)	1,461	▼	−0.5%
U.S. Decennial Census

As of the census of 2010, there were 1,550 people, 633 households, and 421 families residing in the town. The population density was 68.4 inhabitants per square mile (26.4/km^{2}). The racial makeup of the town was 96.4% White, 0.5% Black or African American, 0.7% Native American, 0.5% Asian, 0.0% Pacific Islander, 0.4% from other races, and 1.5% from two or more races. Hispanic or Latino of any race were 1.3% of the population.

There were 633 households, out of which 26.1% had children under the age of 18 living with them, 52.8% were married couples living together, 8.1% had a female householder with no husband present, and 33.5% were non-families. 27.3% of all households were made up of individuals, and 11.3% had someone living alone who was 65 years of age or older. The average household size was 2.45 and the average family size was 2.94.

In the town, the population was spread out, with 26.0% under the age of 20, 4.8% from 20 to 24, 22.2% from 25 to 44, 32.9% from 45 to 64, and 14.2% who were 65 years of age or older. The median age was 42.7 years. For every 100 females, there were 104.2 males. For every 100 females age 18 and over, there were 103.1 males.

The median income for a household in the town was $53,036, and the median income for a family was $55,391. Males had a median income of $45,000 versus $26,492 for females. The per capita income for the town was $21,812. About 10.7% of families and 16.6% of the population were below the poverty line, including 14.3% of those under age 18 and 12.9% of those age 65 or over.

=== Housing ===
There were 981 housing units at an average density of 28.7 per square mile (11.1/km^{2}). 35.5% of housing units were vacant.

There were 633 occupied housing units in the town. 545 were owner-occupied units (86.1%), while 88 were renter-occupied (13.9%). The homeowner vacancy rate was 2.2% of total units. The rental unit vacancy rate was 9.2%.

NOTE: It is common for resort communities to have higher than normal vacant house counts. Many are vacation homes which are seasonal and not regularly occupied.

== Communities and locations in the Town of Lodi ==
- Cat Elbow Corner – A location on the south town line.
- Caywood – A hamlet in the southwest part of the town near Lamoreaux Landing.
- Finger Lakes National Forest – Part of the Finger Lakes National Forest is located in southern Lodi.
- Kelly Corners – A location at the east town line.
- Lamoreaux Landing – A lakeside hamlet in the southwest part of the town.
- Lodi – The Village of Lodi is in the north part of the town at the junction of NY-96A and NY-414.
- Lodi Center – A hamlet south of Lodi village on County Road 137.
- Lodi Point – A projection into Seneca Lake.
- Lodi Point State Park – A state park in the western part of the town line at Lodi Point.
- Lodi Station – A location near the north town line on County Road 131.
- Mill Creek – An important stream in the town that flows west into Seneca Lake.
- Townsendville – A hamlet in the southeast part of the town on County Road 146.

== Notable people ==
- Cornelius Cole, former US Congressman
- George W. Cole, major general by brevet in Union Army during American Civil War
- John De Mott, former US Congressman
- Thomas S. Flood, former US Congressman
- Jehiel H. Halsey, former US Congressman
- Nicoll Halsey, former US Congressman
- Silas Halsey, former US Congressman
- Stanley Wagner (1927–2010), founder of Wagner Vineyards.
