= New York State Route 96A =

State highway in Seneca County, New York, US

New York State Route 96A
- Map of Finger Lakes region in central New York with NY 96A highlighted in red

Route information
- Auxiliary route of NY 96
- Maintained by NYSDOT
- Length: 26.94 mi (43.36 km)
- Existed: early 1940s–present

Major junctions
- South end: NY 96 in Interlaken
- North end: US 20 / NY 5 in Waterloo

Location
- Country: United States
- State: New York
- Counties: Seneca

Highway system
- New York Highways; Interstate; US; State; Reference; Parkways
← NY 96	→ NY 96B

New York State Route 96A (NY 96A) is a state highway in Seneca County, New York, in the United States. It is a north–south road between Seneca Lake and Cayuga Lake, two of the Finger Lakes. NY 96A is two lanes wide for most of its length, with the exception of the 3-mile (5 km) long four-lane divided highway section at the northern end. The southern terminus of NY 96A is at an intersection with NY 96 in the village of Interlaken. Its northern terminus is at a junction with the conjoined routes of U.S. Route 20 (US 20) and NY 5 in the town of Waterloo just east of the city of Geneva. The junction with NY 5 and US 20 was once a trumpet interchange; however, it was converted into an at-grade intersection in the late 1980s.

== Route description ==
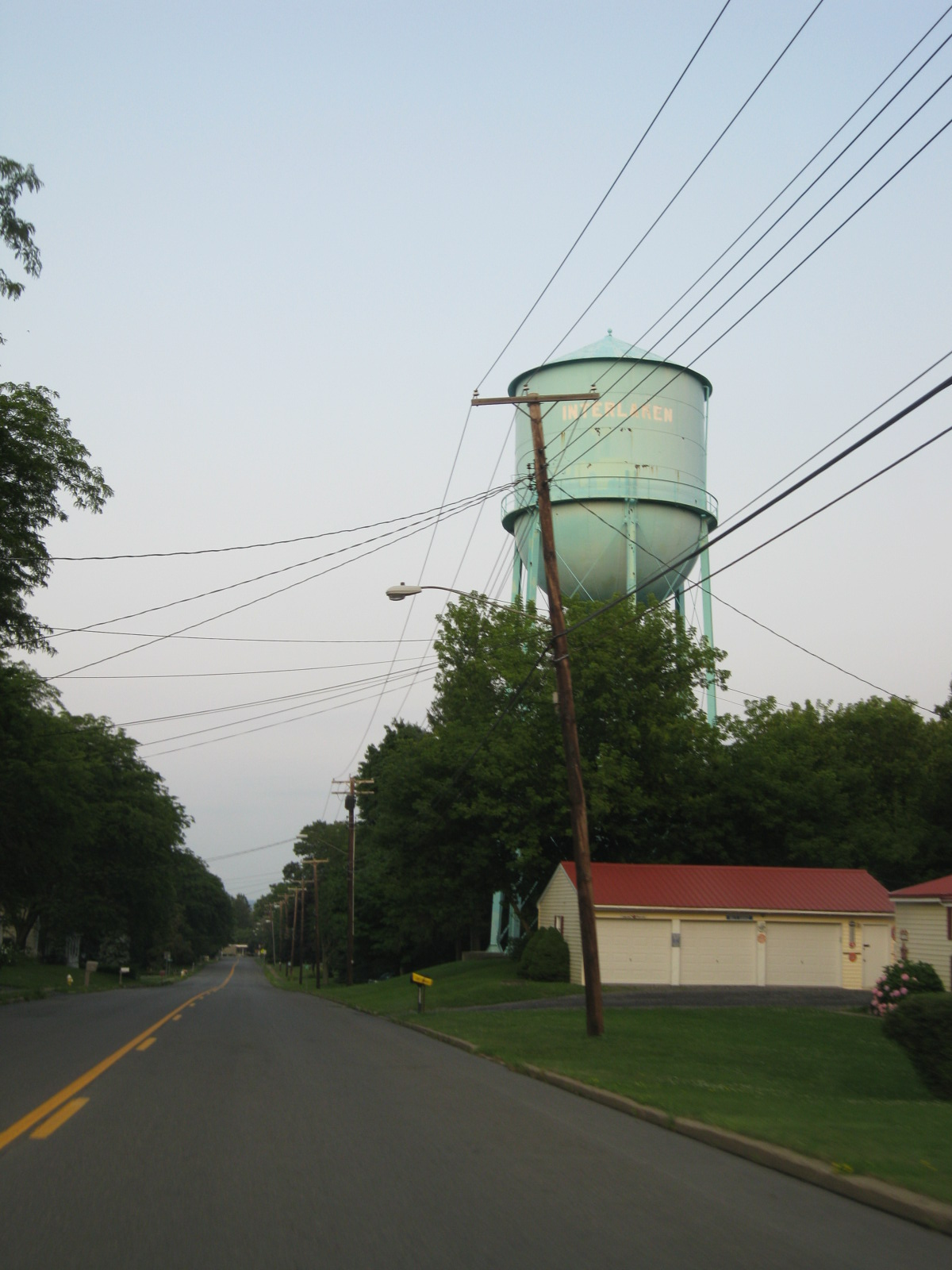
NY 96A heading westward along West Avenue in Interlaken

NY 96A begins at an intersection with NY 96 (Main Street) in the village of Interlaken. The route proceeds westward along West Avenue as a two-lane residential street before leaving the village for the town of Covert, where it becomes rural. NY 96A continues westward through Covert, before crossing into the town of Lodi, where it intersects with County Route 129 (CR 129) and CR 146 (Townsendville Road). Continuing west from CR 129/CR 146, the route gains the name East Seneca Avenue as it enters the village of Lodi. In the village of Lodi, NY 96A continues as a two-lane resident street, before intersecting with NY 414 (South Main Street). At this intersection, NY 96A and NY 414 turn northward on North Main Street, forming a concurrency. After leaving the village, both roads lose the North Main Street moniker, leaving for the town of Lodi.

NY 96A and NY 414 continue northward as a two-lane rural roadway through Lodi, entering the town of Ovid near West Wyckoff Road. In Ovid, the two routes continue along the rural highway, entering the village of Ovid, passing Union Cemetery, and intersecting with CR 132 (Gilbert Road). At that intersection, NY 96A and NY 414 gain the Main Street monikers, crossing the village as a two-lane residential street, intersecting with CR 139. At the north end of the village, NY 96A and NY 414 intersect with NY 96 (North Town Line Road). At this intersection, NY 96A turns west along North Street, while NY 414 and NY 96 form a concurrency northward into the town of Romulus. Continuing west, NY 96A enters the town of Romulus, intersecting with the terminus of CR 139 as a two-lane rural roadway. After crossing over a former railroad right-of-way, NY 96A enters the hamlet of Gilbert, intersecting with CR 132 once again, where the route makes a gradual bend to the north near CR 132A.

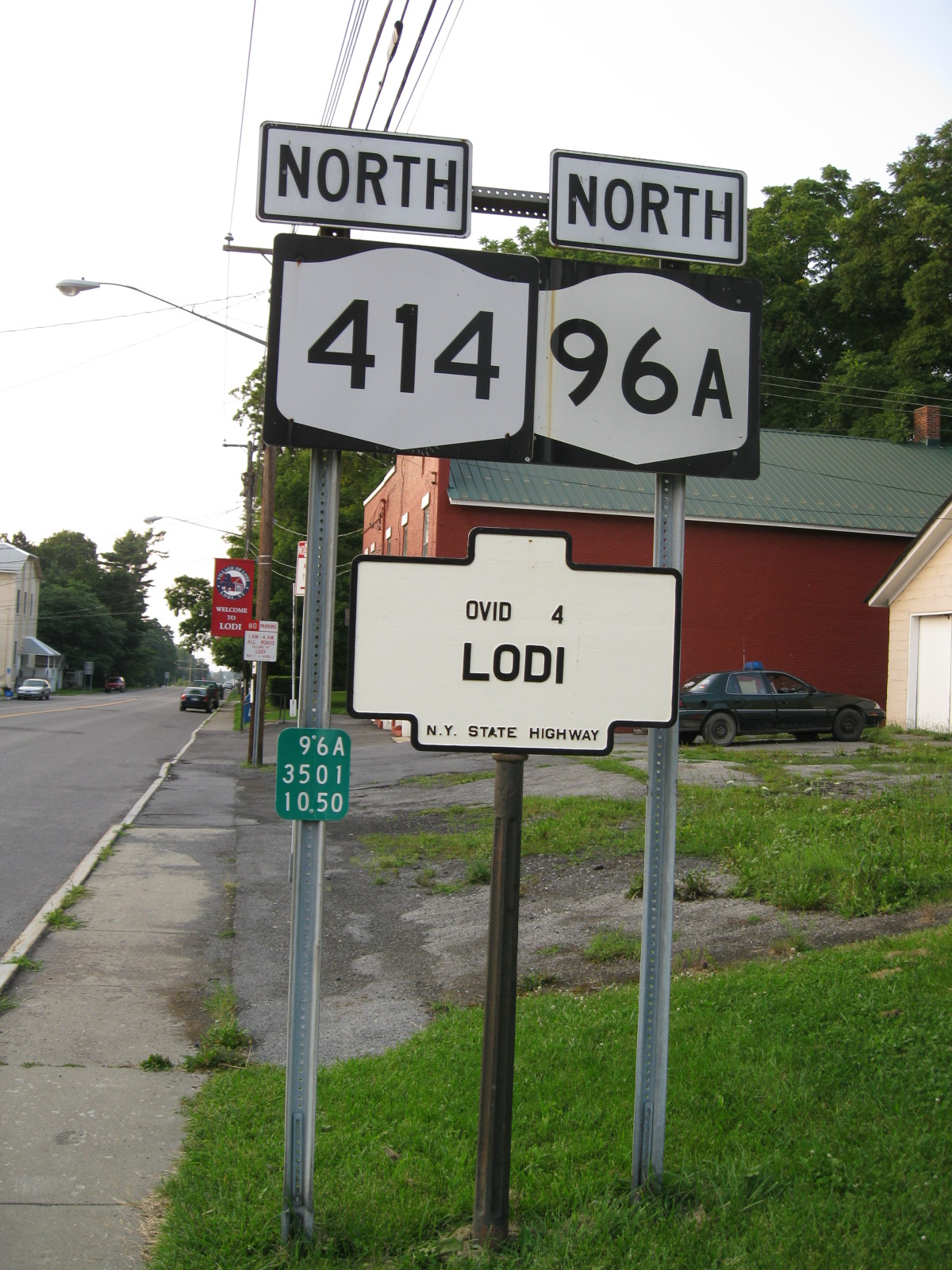
NY 96A and NY 414 crossing north through Lodi

Continuing north through Romulus, the route soon bends to the northwest near Blaine Road, passing the southern edge of the Seneca Army Depot and the northern border of Sampson State Park. Passing the park entrance, NY 96A turns northward, leaving the state park, intersecting with CR 147 and entering the town of Varick, where the right-of-way for the railroad crosses once again. The route continues along the western edge of the army depot to the northernmost part of Varick, where the depot grounds end just south of NY 96A's bridge over Reeder Creek. Not far to the north, NY 96A intersects Yale Station Road (CR 126) at the Varick–Fayette town line. In Fayette, the highway passes a small number of commercial buildings around its junction with the western terminus of NY 336 before running along a stretch of homes. After 1.5 miles (2.4 km), the residences give way to farms once again.

NY 96A enters the hamlet of Rose Hill, where it bends to the northwest, intersecting with the western terminus of CR 120 (Yellow Tavern Road). Continuing northwest, NY 96A intersects with CR 125 (East Lake Road) and becomes a divided four-lane highway. The route bends to the north, intersecting with CR 119 (Boodys Hill Road) near the shore of Seneca Lake. After another bend to the northwest, NY 96A and CR 119 meet once again, which NY 96A crosses the Seneca River after. Now in the town of Waterloo, NY 96A remains a divided highway, entering an at-grade intersection with US 20 and NY 5 (Waterloo–Geneva Road) in Seneca Lake State Park. This intersection serves as NY 96A's northern terminus, while the right-of-way continues north as a connector to CR 110 (Border City Road).

== History ==
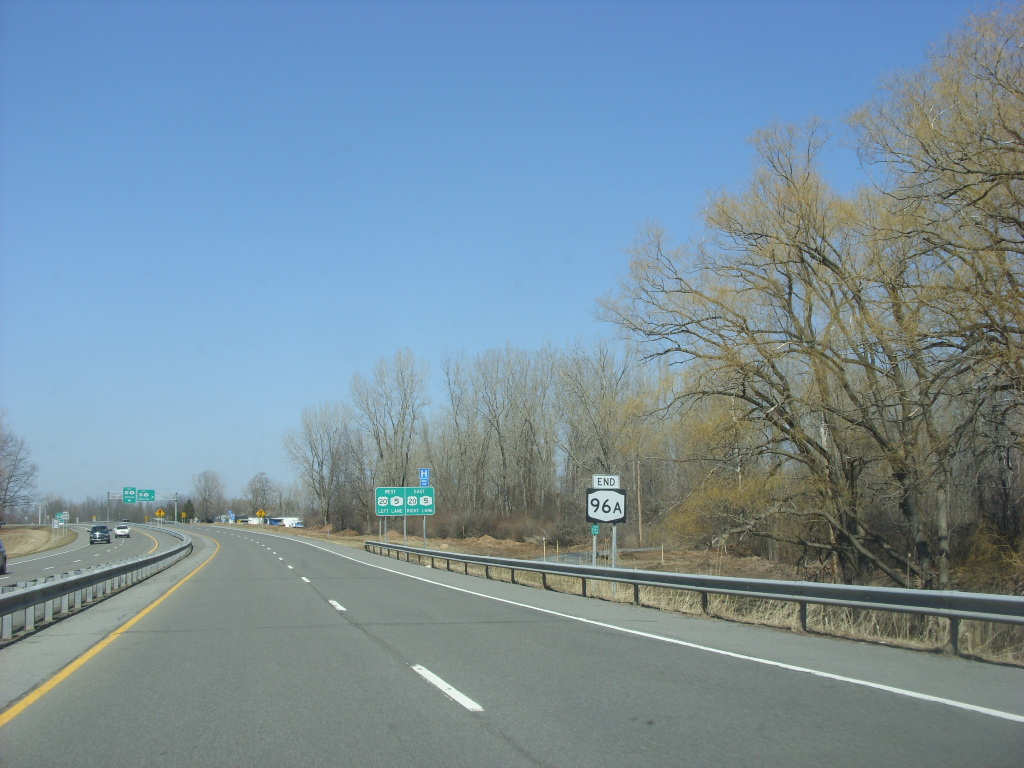
NY 96A approaching its northern terminus at NY 5 and US 20 in Waterloo

The north–south roadway between the villages of Lodi and Ovid was originally designated as part of Route 45, an unsigned legislative route assigned by the New York State Legislature in 1911. In 1912, the route was modified to continue east from Lodi to Interlaken. Both routings of Route 45 became part of NY 15 when the first set of posted routes in New York were assigned in 1924. NY 15 was realigned in the late 1920s to follow a direct alignment between Interlaken and Ovid, bypassing Lodi to the northeast. The former routing of NY 15 between Lodi and Ovid became part of an extended NY 78, which continued northwest to Geneva by way of modern NY 96A.

In the 1930 renumbering of state highways in New York, the former routing of NY 15 between Interlaken and Lodi and the portion of NY 78 north of Lodi were combined to create NY 15A, an alternate route of NY 15 between Interlaken and East Geneva. At the time, NY 15A ended at Border City Road, then designated as US 20 and NY 5. US 20 and NY 5 were shifted slightly southward in the vicinity of Border City by the following year to follow a new lakeside highway. NY 15A was then truncated to its junction with the new road. When US 15 was extended into New York c. 1939, NY 15 was renumbered to NY 2 to eliminate numerical duplication. NY 15A was renumbered accordingly to NY 2A. This designation was short-lived, however, as NY 2 and NY 2A were renumbered again to NY 96 and NY 96A, respectively, in the early 1940s.

US 20 and NY 5 were realigned again onto a new divided highway in the 1960s. NY 96A was extended north to meet the new roadway by way of a trumpet interchange. The interchange was downgraded into an at-grade intersection in the early 1990s.

== Major intersections ==
The entire route is in Seneca County.

Location	mi	km	Destinations	Notes
Interlaken	0.00	0.00	NY 96 (Main Street)	Southern terminus
Village of Lodi	5.01	8.06	NY 414 south (South Main Street) – Watkins Glen	Southern terminus of NY 96A / NY 414 overlap
Village of Ovid	9.68	15.58	NY 96 / NY 414 north (North Town Line Road) – Seneca Falls, Interlaken, Ithaca	Northern terminus of NY 96A / NY 414 overlap
Fayette	21.10	33.96	NY 336 east	Western terminus of NY 336
Town of Waterloo	26.94	43.36	US 20 / NY 5 – Waterloo, Geneva	Northern terminus; hamlet of East Geneva
1.000 mi = 1.609 km; 1.000 km = 0.621 mi: Concurrency terminus
