= Covert Bailey =

American author and television personality

Covert Bailey (b. 1931) is a retired author, television personality, and lecturer on fitness and diet during the 1990s. His best selling book, Fit or Fat, first published in 1978, emphasized the role of aerobic exercise and weightlifting in promoting weight-loss. From 1978 to 1999, he authored or co-authored 8 different books on health, diet, and nutrition. In 1990 Bailey appeared in a PBS series Fit or Fat for the 90s, produced by KVIE of Sacramento, California.

== Biography ==
Bailey was born in Boston, and briefly attended Bates College in Lewiston, Maine, before dropping out to enlist in the U.S. Army in 1952. After graduating from the Army Language School in Monterey, California, he served in the U.S. Army in Germany during the Cold War. After his service, he re-entered college and earned a bachelor's and a master's degree from Boston University in geology. In 1967 he enrolled in the master's program in nutritional biochemistry. He began his career as a nutritionist working for the California Dairy Council, giving lectures on diet, and gradually built up his skills as a lecturer.
