= Lodi (village), New York =

Lodi, New York
- Village
- Location within the state of New York
- Coordinates: 42°36′48″N 76°49′27″W
- Country: United States
- State: New York
- County: Seneca
- Town: Lodi
- Incorporated: November 14, 1925

Government
  - Type: Board of Trustees
  - Mayor: Michael Huff
  - Clerk: Nancy Jones

Area
  - Total: 0.55 sq mi (1.43 km^{2})
  - Land: 0.55 sq mi (1.43 km^{2})
  - Water: 0.0039 sq mi (0.01 km^{2})
- Elevation: 1,106 ft (337 m)

Population (2020)
  - Total: 254
  - Density: 460.9/sq mi (177.94/km^{2})
- Time zone: UTC-5 (Eastern (EST))
  - Summer (DST): UTC-4 (EDT)
- ZIP code: 14860
- Area code: 607
- FIPS code: 36-43214
- GNIS feature ID: 0974039
- Website: http://lodiny.com/village/

Lodi is a village in Seneca County, New York, United States. The population was 291 at the 2010 census.

The Village of Lodi is in the north part of the Town of Lodi and is northwest of Ithaca, New York. It owes its name to the Italian city of Lodi.

Lodi Point State Park is west of the village on the shore of Seneca Lake.

== History ==
This part of New York was in the territory of the Seneca tribe until the Sullivan Expedition drove them away. The area was then assigned to the Central New York Military Tract used to pay soldiers for service in the American Revolution. The Lodi Methodist Church, designed by noted church architect Warren H. Hayes (1847–1899), was listed on the National Register of Historic Places in 1982.

== Geography ==
Lodi is located at 42°36′48″N 76°49′27″W (42.613366, -76.824082).

According to the United States Census Bureau, the village has a total area of 0.6 square miles (1.5 km^{2}).None of the area is covered with water.

Lodi is in the Finger Lakes District of New York.

New York State Route 96A and New York State Route 414 intersect at the village.

== Demographics ==
Historical population
Census	Pop.	Note	%±
1880	433		—
1930	322		—
1940	366		13.7%
1950	362		−1.1%
1960	396		9.4%
1970	353		−10.9%
1980	334		−5.4%
1990	364		9.0%
2000	338		−7.1%
2010	291		−13.9%
2020	254		−12.7%
U.S. Decennial Census

As of the census of 2010, there were 291 people, 118 households, and 81 families residing in the village. The population density was 485.0 inhabitants per square mile (187.3/km^{2}). The racial makeup of the village was 97.6% White, 0.0% Black or African American, 0.7% Native American, 1.0% Asian, 0.0% Pacific Islander, 0.3% from other races, and 0.3% from two or more races. Hispanic or Latino of any race were 1.4% of the population.

There were 118 households, out of which 27.1% had children under the age of 18 living with them, 45.8% were married couples living together, 14.4% had a female householder with no husband present, and 31.4% were non-families. 27.1% of all households were made up of individuals, and 7.6% had someone living alone who was 65 years of age or older. The average household size was 2.47 and the average family size was 2.90.

In the village, the population was spread out, with 27.8% under the age of 20, 5.8% from 20 to 24, 24.4% from 25 to 44, 28.8% from 45 to 64, and 13.1% who were 65 years of age or older. The median age was 40.3 years. For every 100 females, there were 122.1 males. For every 100 females age 18 and over, there were 116.7 males.

The median income for a household in the village was $40,417, and the median income for a family was $52,500. Males had a median income of $31,250 versus $25,000 for females. The per capita income for the village was $19,108. About 21.2% of families and 19.5% of the population were below the poverty line, including 7.3% of those under age 18 and 22.9% of those age 65 or over.

=== Housing ===
There were 142 housing units at an average density of 236.7 per square mile (91.4/km^{2}). 16.9% of housing units were vacant.

There were 118 occupied housing units in the village. 97 were owner-occupied units (82.2%), while 21 were renter-occupied (17.8%). The homeowner vacancy rate was 4.0% of total units. The rental unit vacancy rate was 0.0%.
