= Covert, New York =

- Town
- Location within the state of New York
- Coordinates: 42°35′37″N 76°42′00″W
- Country: United States
- State: New York
- County: Seneca
- Settled: 1797
- Established: April 7, 1817

Government
  - Type: Town Board
  - Supervisor: Michael Reynolds
  - Clerk: Leslie Adams-Compton
  - Court: Justice Eileen M. Schmidt

Area
  - Total: 37.58 sq mi (97.33 km^{2})
  - Land: 31.39 sq mi (81.29 km^{2})
  - Water: 6.20 sq mi (16.05 km^{2})
- Elevation: 915 ft (279 m)

Population (2020)
  - Total: 2,135 ▼
  - Estimate (2021): 2,125
  - Density: 68/sq mi (26.3/km^{2})
- Time zone: UTC-5 (Eastern (EST))
  - Summer (DST): UTC-4 (EDT)
- Area code: 607
- FIPS code: 36-18663
- GNIS feature ID: 0978874
- Website: http://www.townofcovertny.gov/

Covert is a town in Seneca County, New York, United States. The population was 2,135 at the 2020 census.

The Town of Covert is located in the southeast corner of the county and is northwest of Ithaca, New York. Government offices for the town are located in Interlaken.

The primary postal district covering the Town of Covert is ZIP Code 14847 for Interlaken.

== History ==
Covert was in the Central New York Military Tract. The town was first settled around 1797.

The town was set aside from the Town of Ovid in 1817 as part of Tompkins County, but was returned to Seneca County in 1819. The Town of Lodi was taken off the western part of Covert in 1826.

In 1904, Interlaken became incorporated village. The community was previously known as "Farmer."

The Covert Historic District is listed on the National Register of Historic Places.

== Geography ==
According to the United States Census Bureau, the town has a total area of 37.6 square miles (97 km^{2}), of which, 31.5 square miles (82 km^{2}) of it is land and 6.1 square miles (16 km^{2}) of it (16.31%) is water.

The south town line borders Schuyler County, New York, to the southwest and Tompkins County to the southeast and the east town line is defined by Cayuga Lake, one of the Finger Lakes. The town of Lodi is to the west and the town of Ovid is to the north.

New York State Route 89 and New York State Route 96 are north–south highways in the town. New York State Route 96A joins N.Y. Route 96 at Interlaken.

== Demographics ==
Historical population
Census	Pop.	Note	%±
1820	3,459		—
1830	1,791		−48.2%
1840	1,563		−12.7%
1850	2,253		44.1%
1860	2,410		7.0%
1870	2,238		−7.1%
1880	2,166		−3.2%
1890	1,963		−9.4%
1900	1,897		−3.4%
1910	1,947		2.6%
1920	1,661		−14.7%
1930	1,578		−5.0%
1940	1,633		3.5%
1950	1,843		12.9%
1960	1,965		6.6%
1970	2,097		6.7%
1980	2,188		4.3%
1990	2,246		2.7%
2000	2,227		−0.8%
2010	2,154		−3.3%
2020	2,135		−0.9%
2021 (est.)	2,125		−0.5%
U.S. Decennial Census

As of the census of 2010, there were 2,154 people, 879 households, and 596 families residing in the town. The population density was 68.4 inhabitants per square mile (26.4/km^{2}). The racial makeup of the town was 96.6% White, 0.8% Black or African American, 0.3% Native American, 0.8% Asian, 0.0% Pacific Islander, 0.2% from other races, and 1.3% from two or more races. Hispanic or Latino of any race were 1.0% of the population.

There were 879 households, out of which 26.1% had children under the age of 18 living with them, 55.2% were married couples living together, 7.8% had a female householder with no husband present, and 32.2% were non-families. 24.8% of all households were made up of individuals, and 15.7% had someone living alone who was 65 years of age or older. The average household size was 2.41 and the average family size was 2.84.

In the town, the population was spread out, with 23.0% under the age of 20, 4.8% from 20 to 24, 21.6% from 25 to 44, 32.4% from 45 to 64, and 18.1% who were 65 years of age or older. The median age was 45.4 years. For every 100 females, there were 105.9 males. For every 100 females age 18 and over, there were 103.2 males.

The median income for a household in the town was $49,612, and the median income for a family was $64,893. Males had a median income of $43,929 versus $37,344 for females. The per capita income for the town was $26,088. About 6.8% of families and 11.4% of the population were below the poverty line, including 11.4% of those under age 18 and 9.1% of those age 65 or over.

=== Housing ===
There were 1,284 housing units at an average density of 40.8 per square mile (15.8/km^{2}). 31.5% of housing units were vacant.

There were 879 occupied housing units in the town. 716 were owner-occupied units (81.5%), while 163 were renter-occupied (18.5%). The homeowner vacancy rate was 2.1% of total units. The rental unit vacancy rate was 7.7%.

NOTE: It is common for resort communities to have higher than normal vacant house counts. Many are vacation homes which are seasonal and not regularly occupied.

== Communities and locations in the Town of Covert ==
- Bergen Beach – A hamlet on the shore of Cayuga Lake.
- Cold Springs – A hamlet on the lake shore south of Bergen Beach.
- Covert – The hamlet of Covert is south of Interlaken on NY-96. The Covert Historic District was listed on the National Register of Historic Places in 1980.
- Dawson Corners – A location southeast of Covert on County Road 142.
- Finger Lakes National Forest – Part of the Finger Lakes National Forest is located in southwestern Covert.
- Frontenac Point – A projection into Cayuga Lake in the southeast part of the town.
- Halls Corners – A location south of Interlaken on County Road 143.
- Holton Beach – A lakeshore hamlet north of Bergen Beach.
- Interlaken – The Village of Interlaken in the north part of the town on NY-96.
- Interlaken Beach – A lakeshore hamlet near the north town line.
- Little Point – A small projection into Cayuga Lake south of Cold Springs.
- Osgood Landing – A lakeshore hamlet in the southeast part of the town.
- Six Corners – A location west of Covert village.
- Taughannock Falls State Park – A state park, mostly in Tompkins County, by the shore of Cayuga Lake at the south town line.
- Taughannock Point – A projection into Cayuga Lake at the south town line.
