= Interlaken, New York =

- Village
- Location within the state of New York
- Coordinates: 42°37′5″N 76°43′27″W
- Country: United States
- State: New York
- County: Seneca
- Incorporated: March 2, 1904
- Named for: Interlaken, Switzerland

Government
  - Type: Board of Trustees
  - Mayor: Richard J. Richardson
  - Clerk: Nancy Swartwood
  - Chief of police: Robert Dwello

Area
  - Total: 0.31 sq mi (0.80 km^{2})
  - Land: 0.31 sq mi (0.80 km^{2})
  - Water: 0 sq mi (0.00 km^{2})
- Elevation: 906 ft (276 m)

Population (2020)
  - Total: 595
  - Density: 1,938.0/sq mi (748.28/km^{2})
- Time zone: UTC-5 (Eastern (EST))
  - Summer (DST): UTC-4 (EDT)
- ZIP code: 14847
- Area code: 607
- FIPS code: 36-37528
- GNIS feature ID: 0974030
- Website: http://www.interlaken-ny.us/

Interlaken is a village in Seneca County, New York, United States. The population was 595 at the 2020 census. The name is related to the village's position between two lakes.

The Village of Interlaken is in the northern part of the Town of Covert and is northwest of Ithaca, New York.

== History ==
The first European or White settlers settled the area in the late 1790s and early 1800s. The Village of Interlaken was home to many families from the New England and New Jersey areas. Early businesses included hotels, blacksmiths, post office, bank, and in time the railroad station. All designed to support the local families and the farmers from the surrounding area.

Four churches were established to serve the community, Union Baptist in 1819, Reformed Church of Farmerville in 1830, a Universalist church in 1850 and St. Francis Solanus Catholic Church in 1874. The First Baptist Church of Interlaken was listed on the National Register of Historic Places in 2002.

Originally called Farmerville, then Farmer, and Farmer Village the hamlet continued to grow. Prosperous homes were built on Main Street, Lodi Street (now West Avenue), and along the side streets. LeRoy, Lake View, Clinton and Knight Streets were the last to be added.

In 1904 two events occurred in close proximity. With the increase in summer travelers coming to the area on the Lehigh Valley Railroad there was a movement to rename the railroad depot something more than Farmer. The Railroad sponsored a contest to suggest names for the station and a school teacher, Miss Georgiana Wheeler, suggested the name of Interlaken based on her travels to Switzerland. The residents of the village were also working to establish the community as an incorporated village. Several names were suggested and votes taken. In a spirit of unity the Farmer Review encouraged the members of the village to unite behind the name Interlaken. On March 2, 1904, the Village was incorporated, and the following Saturday the Interlaken Review replaced the Farmer Review.

The look of Main Street changed over the years with major fires in December 1880 when much of the south end of business Main Street burned; in February 1891 when the Gambee House burned, it would be replaced with the Goodman House; in April 1926 when the warehouse at the corner of Orchard and Main burned and when the Robinson Hotel burned in February 1939.

Many businesses remain in and near the Village, continuing the tradition of serving the needs of the community and surrounding area.

== Geography ==
According to the United States Census Bureau, the village has a total area of 0.3 square miles (0.78 km^{2}), all of it land.

Interlaken is at the junction of New York State Route 96, New York State Route 96A, and County Road 141.

Interlaken is in the Finger Lakes District and is between, but not adjacent to, Seneca Lake and Cayuga Lake.

== Demographics ==
Historical population
Census	Pop.	Note	%±
1910	693		—
1920	633		−8.7%
1930	660		4.3%
1940	661		0.2%
1950	770		16.5%
1960	780		1.3%
1970	733		−6.0%
1980	685		−6.5%
1990	680		−0.7%
2000	674		−0.9%
2010	602		−10.7%
2020	595		−1.2%
U.S. Decennial Census

As of the census of 2010, there were 602 people, 243 households, and 147 families residing in the village. The population density was 2,006.7 inhabitants per square mile (774.8/km^{2}). The racial makeup of the village was 95.2% White, 1.7% Black or African American, 0.3% Native American, 1.5% Asian, 0.0% Pacific Islander, 0.0% from other races, and 1.3% from two or more races. Hispanic or Latino of any race were 0.7% of the population.

There were 243 households, out of which 30.5% had children under the age of 18 living with them, 44.9% were married couples living together, 11.5% had a female householder with no husband present, and 39.5% were non-families. 32.9% of all households were made up of individuals, and 14.4% had someone living alone who was 65 years of age or older. The average household size was 2.36 and the average family size was 3.01.

In the village, the population was spread out, with 25.0% under the age of 20, 8.0% from 20 to 24, 23.6% from 25 to 44, 27.0% from 45 to 64, and 16.5% who were 65 years of age or older. The median age was 38.1 years. For every 100 females, there were 99.3 males. For every 100 females age 18 and over, there were 95.0 males.

The median income for a household in the village was $44,688, and the median income for a family was $71,875. Males had a median income of $45,208 versus $37,000 for females. The per capita income for the village was $23,402. About 14.5% of families and 20.1% of the population were below the poverty line, including 26.5% of those under age 18 and 15.5% of those age 65 or over.

== Farmerville-Union Lodge #183 ==
Since the mid-19th century, the village has also been the home to local civic and fraternal organizations, most notably Farmerville-Union Lodge No. 183 of the Free and Accepted Masons, chartered in December 1850. Over generations, the lodge has served as a community hub on North Main Street, counting among its membership prominent local leaders, merchants, and state level public figures.

- John D. Covert (1852-1934): A descendant of the pioneer Covert family for whom the surrounding town is named, Covert served as a Seneca County Officer, local historian, and Worshipful Master of the lodge in 1901.
- Theodore D. "Ted" Day (1917-2003): A lifelong Interlaken resident and member of the lodge, Day served as a New York State Assemblyman (1961-1965), New York State Senator (1965-1972). and Deputy Commissioner of the New York State Department of Agriculture and Markets under Governor Nelson Rockefeller.

== Housing ==
There were 289 housing units at an average density of 963.3 per square mile (371.9/km^{2}). 15.9% of housing units were vacant.

There were 243 occupied housing units in the village. 165 were owner-occupied units (67.9%), while 78 were renter-occupied (32.1%). The homeowner vacancy rate was 4.0% of total units. The rental unit vacancy rate was 11.4%.

== Police Department ==
The Interlaken Village Police Department is one of the oldest Village police departments in New York State. It is the municipal law-enforcement agency serving the Village of Interlaken in Seneca County, New York, United States. The department traces its origins to the village’s incorporation in 1904, when Interlaken—formerly known as Farmer Village—established local governance structures that would have included peace officers such as constables or marshals typical of New York villages in the early twentieth century.

=== Early history ===
Prior to incorporation, law enforcement in the rural community was likely carried out by local constables or county authorities. However, Interlaken’s history shows that a police organization existed as early as 1890, based on records from local newspapers. This aligns with common practice in New York State villages, where informal or locally organized law enforcement often preceded the establishment of formal municipal police departments.

Following incorporation in 1904, Interlaken gained the authority to appoint village officials responsible for maintaining public order, thereby forming the institutional foundation of what would become the modern Village Police Department.

=== Development ===
Throughout the twentieth century, small New York villages such as Interlaken typically maintained part-time or small-force police services, often working in coordination with the Seneca County Sheriff’s Office and New York State Police for broader enforcement and emergency response. This cooperative model reflects the limited population and geographic scale of the village.

=== Present role ===
Today, the Interlaken Village Police Department continues to provide local patrol, public safety, and community-oriented policing services within village boundaries while collaborating with county and state agencies for major incidents, investigations, and specialized services.

== Notable people ==
- Theodore D. Day, farmer and politician who served in the New York Assembly and Senate
- Rod Serling, screenwriter, playwright, television producer, and narrator best known as the creator of The Twilight Zone
