= John Covert (painter) =

American artist (1882–1960)

John Covert (1882 – 1960) was an American painter born in Pittsburgh, USA.

== Life and career ==
Covert began his formal studies in painting at the Pittsburgh School of Design in 1902 under Martin Leisser and then, upon receiving a German government art scholarship, traveled to Munich, Germany in 1909 to attend the Akademie der Bildenden Kunste, where he mentored under Carl Marr, another American. In 1912 he went to Paris, France, where he stayed for two years, until the beginning of World War I in 1914, after which he moved to New York City. He was a close friend of Marcel Duchamp, a founding member and first secretary of the Society of Independent Artists, a participant in the Societe Anonyme, and a notable Dadaist in the Arensberg Circle, at the forefront of American Modernism. He was one of the first American artists to affix three-dimensional objects onto paintings.

In 1923 Covert returned to Pittsburgh, where he worked as a salesman in his family business, which provided parts to the steel industry, while pursuing his interest in cryptography, researching the Baconian theory of Shakespeare authorship and working privately in various artistic mediums. He died in 1960 and was buried at Allegheny Cemetery.
