= Penn-York Valley =

Group of communities in New York-Pennsylvania, U.S.

Coordinates: 41°59′N 76°32′W

- Valley
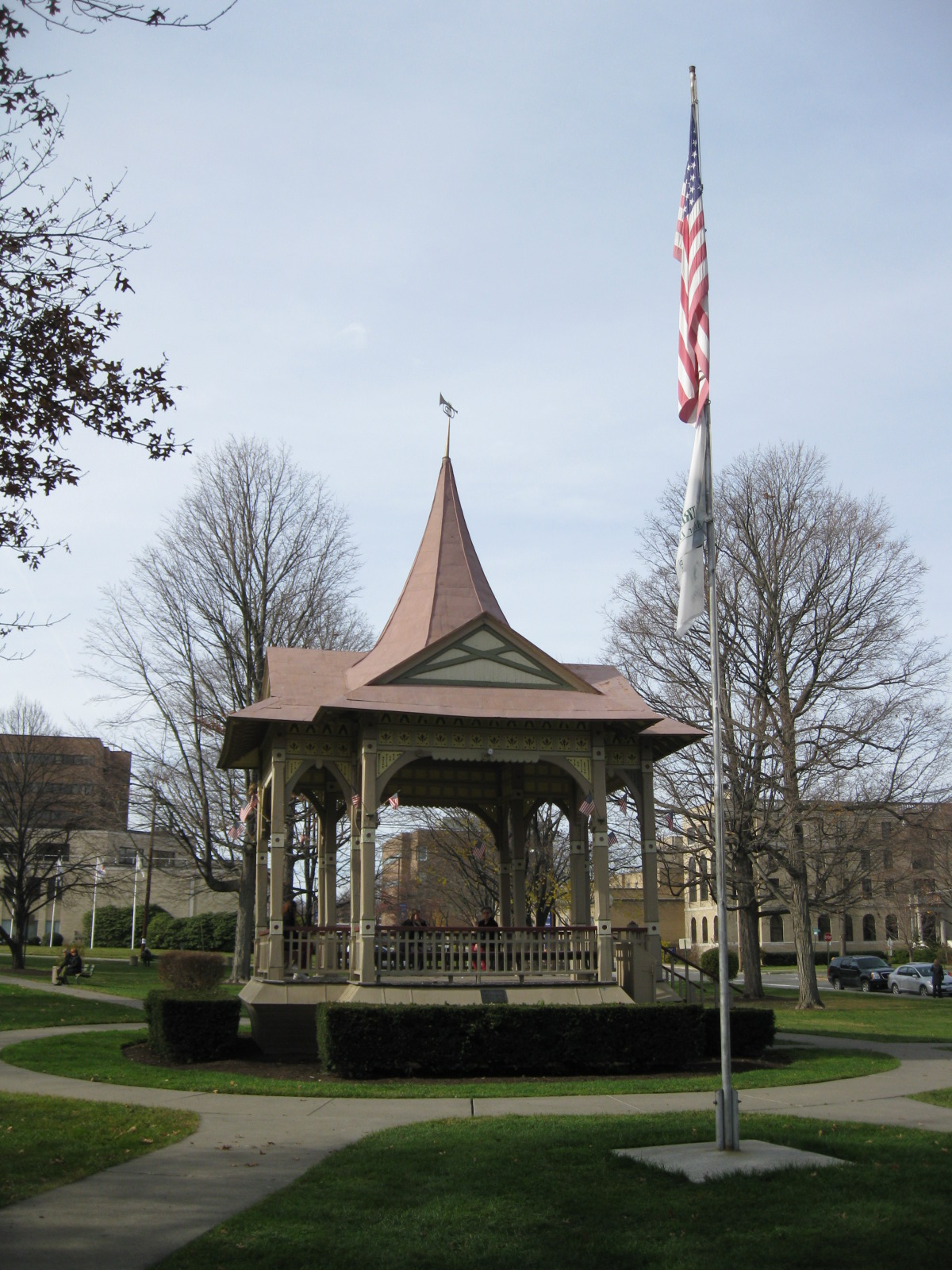
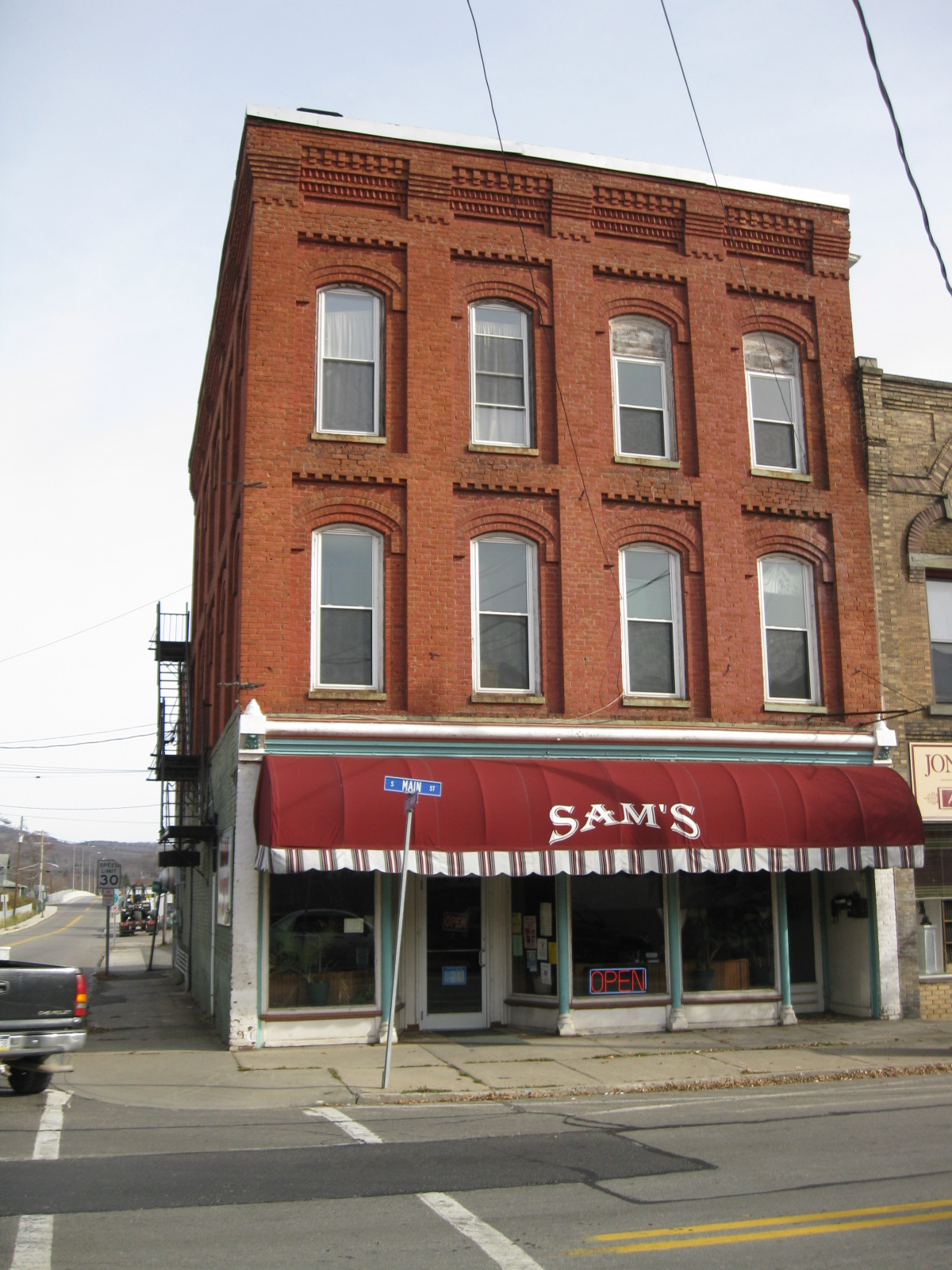
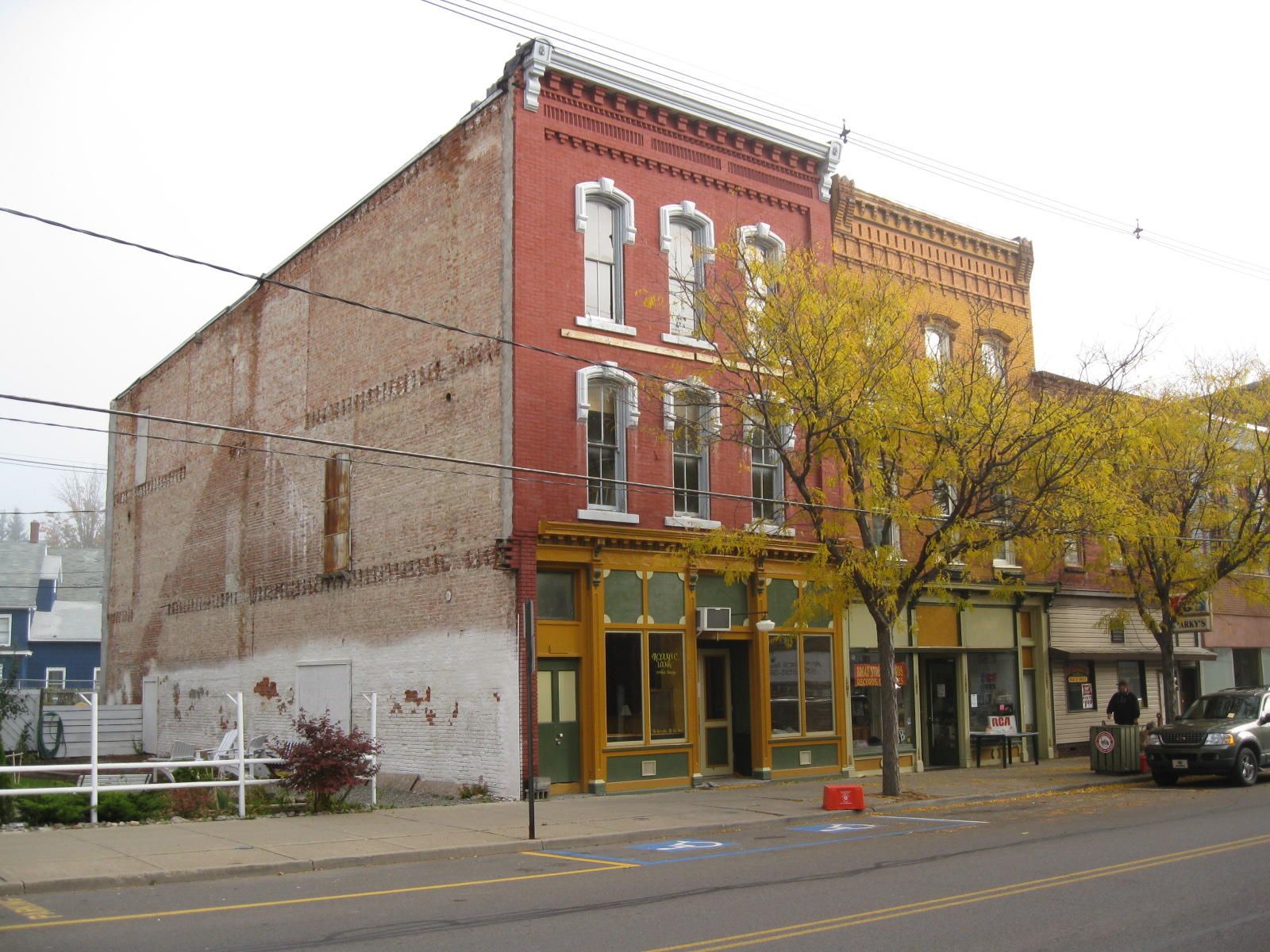
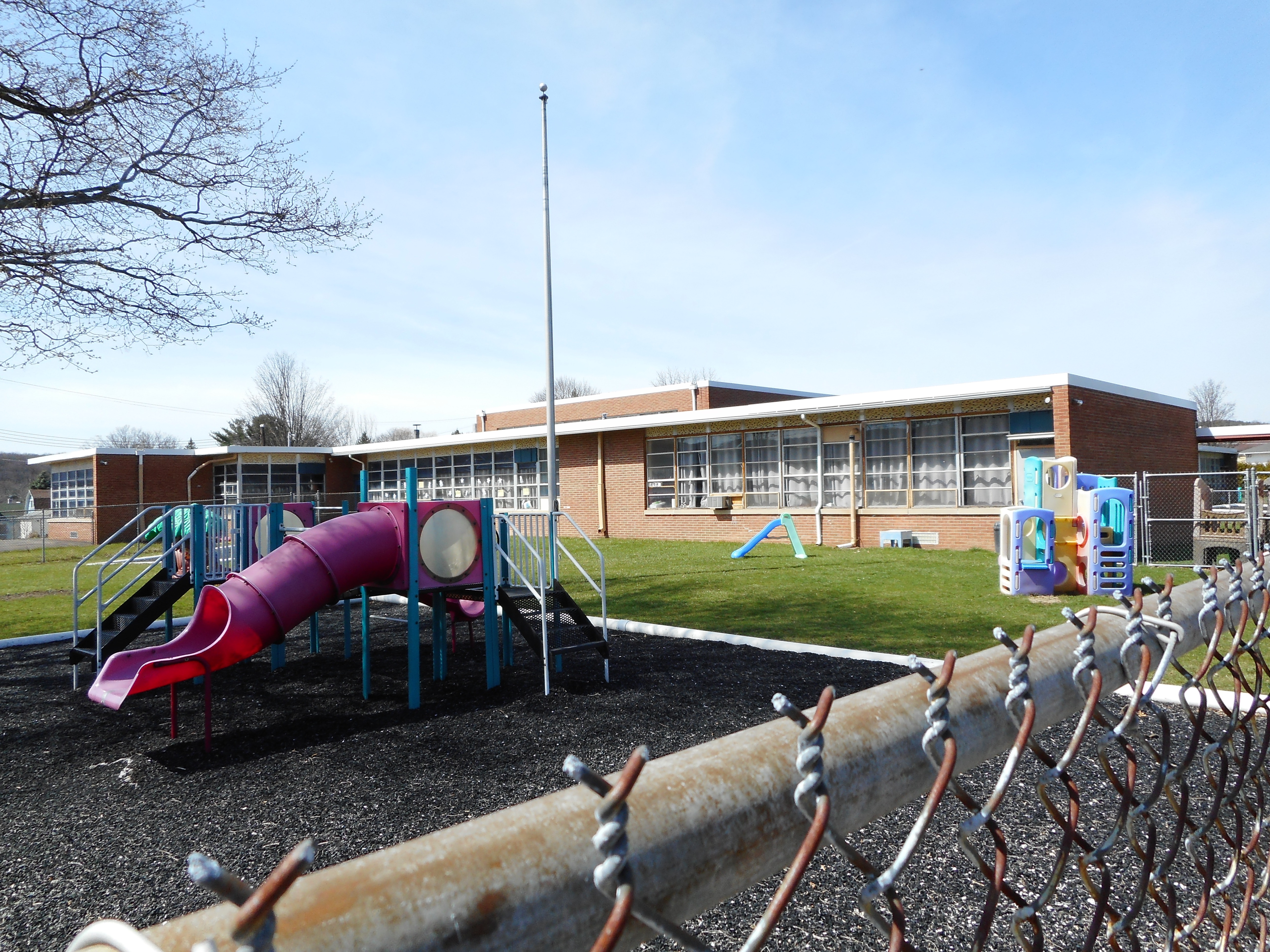
- Public park in Sayre, Main street diner in Athens, Shopping plaza in Waverly, School in South Waverly.
- Nickname: "The Valley"
- Interactive map of Penn-York Valley

Population
  - Total: 35,000

The Penn-York Valley (referred to locally as The Valley) is a densely populated group of communities that straddles the New York and Pennsylvania border. It includes the villages and boroughs of Sayre, Athens, South Waverly, and Waverly.

These four central communities have a population of 14,822 as of the 2000 Census, a population of 14,425 as of the 2010 Census, and as of the 2020 Census, the core population is 14,113. The entire Greater Valley has a population near 35,000.

Due to geographic boundaries, the Penn-York Valley is broken up into two Census regions: the Binghamton metropolitan area and the Sayre micropolitan area. The Valley is part of the Twin Tiers.

The community saw historic flooding due to rain from Tropical Storm Lee, exceeding levels of the Mid-Atlantic United States flood of 2006. Damages in Tioga County alone were estimated at around $100 million.

== Education ==
The Penn-York Valley's education system is set by three different and separate school districts.

- Waverly Central School District - Serving Waverly, Chemung, Lockwood, and sections of Lowman, Barton, and Wellsburg.
- Sayre Area School District - Serving Sayre, South Waverly, and Litchfield.
- Athens Area School District - Serving Athens, Athens Township, Ridgebury, Smithfield, Ulster and Sheshequin.

Private Education

- Epiphany School - catholic Elementary and Middle school in Sayre.
- Zion Ministerial Institute - private religious school in Waverly, of the religious organization Zion Fellowship International. The organization's world headquarters in Waverly.

== Transportation ==
The valley has three local bus services, the first is Ride Tioga. Ride Tioga stops throughout Waverly, Sayre, and Barton. The second is BeST Transit. BeST Transit makes numerous stops in Waverly, Sayre, and Athens and provides service to Towanda, Wysox, Troy, Canton, and the Lycoming Mall. The third is C-TRAN operating out of Elmira and making daily stops in Waverly, Wilawana, Chemung and points west. Shortline Coach USA and Greyhound regional bus services stop in Waverly, as well. The village also has taxi service available through Valley Taxi which travels throughout the vicinities of Waverly, Sayre, Athens, and Binghamton. The valley is also conveniently located between the Elmira-Corning Regional Airport in the Town of Big Flats and the Greater Binghamton Airport located in Maine, New York, both of which are medium-sized regional airports serving the Southern Tier of New York.

== Media ==
Newspaper

- Press & Sun Bulletin (based in Binghamton, serves the area)
- Morning Times (based in Sayre; serves Waverly, Sayre, Athens and surrounding communities)
- The Daily Review (based in Towanda; serves the Penn-York Valley and Bradford County)
- Star Gazette (based in Elmira; serves Tioga, Chemung and Steuben Counties in NY and Bradford County in PA)

Radio

- WAVR - 102.1 FM (based in Sayre; licensed in Waverly for FM broadcasting)
- WATS - 960 AM (based in Sayre; licensed in Sayre for AM broadcasting)
- WCIH - 94.3 FM (based in Elmira; licensed in Elmira for FM broadcasting)
- WEBO - 1330 AM (based in Owego; branded to Waverly for AM broadcasting)
- WENI-FM - 92.7 FM (based in Elmira; licensed in S. Waverly for FM broadcasting)
- WGMF-FM - 103.9 FM (licensed in Dushore, Pennsylvania)

Television

- WBNG-TV Binghamton NY - CBS Affiliate
- WIVT-TV Binghamton NY - ABC Affiliate
- WBGH-CA Binghamton NY - NBC Affiliate
- WICZ-TV Binghamton NY - Fox Affiliate
- WETM-TV Elmira NY - NBC Affiliate
- WENY-TV Elmira NY - ABC Affiliate
- WENY-DT2 Elmira NY - CBS Affiliate
- W52CE-TV Sayre PA - Fox Affiliate, (a Class A broadcast relay station for WOLF-TV Hazleton PA - UHF)
- WNEP-TV Scranton PA - ABC Affiliate
- WYOU-TV Scranton PA - CBS Affiliate
- YNN Syracuse NY - Time Warner Cable Regional
