= Pennsylvania Route 199 =

State highway in Bradford County, Pennsylvania, US

Pennsylvania Route 199

Route information
- Maintained by PennDOT
- Length: 4.833 mi (7.778 km)
- Existed: 1974–present

Major junctions
- South end: US 220 near Athens
- North end: I-86 / NY 17 / NY 34 at the New York state line in South Waverly

Location
- Country: United States
- State: Pennsylvania
- Counties: Bradford

Highway system
- Pennsylvania State Route System; Interstate; US; State; Scenic; Legislative
← PA 198	→ PA 201

Pennsylvania Route 199 (PA 199) is a 4.8-mile-long (7.7 km) state highway located in Bradford County in Pennsylvania. The southern terminus is at U.S. Route 220 (US 220) near Athens. The northern terminus is the New York state line in Sayre, where it connects to New York State Route 34 (NY 34) and an interchange with Interstate 86 (I-86). PA 199 runs north–south through the Penn-York Valley communities of Athens and Sayre, following Main Street in Athens and Keystone Avenue, Mohawk Street, and Spring Street in Sayre. The section of PA 199 between the southern terminus and the intersection of Keystone Avenue and Mohawk Street in Sayre was designated as part of US 711 when the U.S. Highway System was created in 1926, being renumbered to US 220 a year later. Between 1930 and the 1960s, US 309 was concurrent with this portion of US 220. In the 1970s, US 220 was moved to a western bypass of the towns and PA 199 was designated onto its current alignment.

== Route description ==
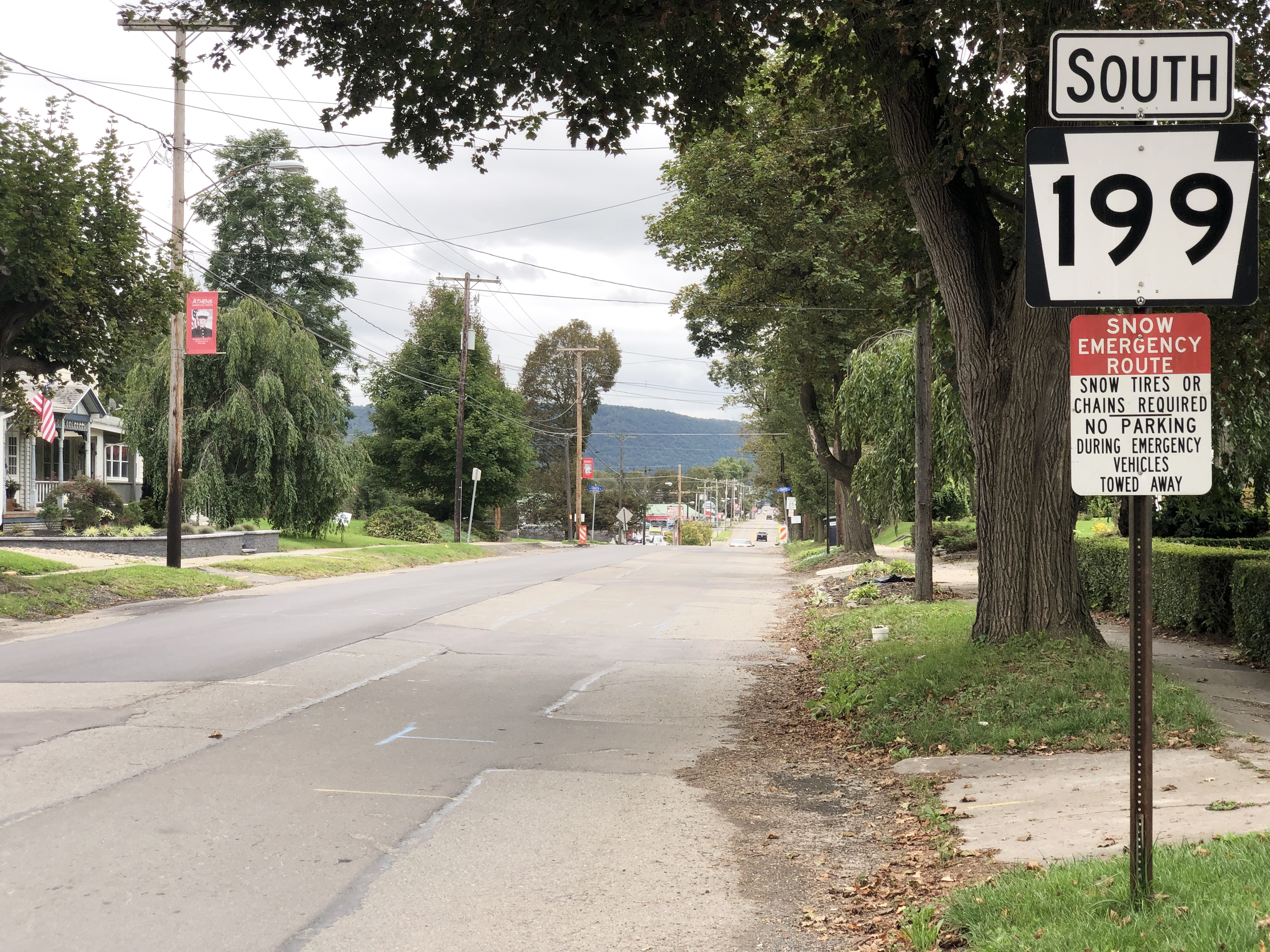
PA 199 southbound at Pine Street in Athens

PA 199 begins at an intersection with US 220 in Athens Township, Bradford County, heading east on a two-lane undivided road. The route immediately passes over the Lehigh Secondary railroad line, which is owned by Norfolk Southern and operated by the Lehigh Railway, and turns to the north. The road runs between homes and commercial development to the west and farm fields to the east a short distance west of the Chemung River. PA 199 curves east and crosses the Chemung River into the borough of Athens, where it heads into residential areas and turns north onto South Main Street. The route continues past homes a short distance to the west of the Susquehanna River before it passes through the downtown area of Athens, becoming North Main Street upon crossing the Lehigh Secondary at-grade in an industrial area. The road heads past residences and crosses into the borough of Sayre, where the name changes to South Keystone Avenue. PA 199 runs past a mix of homes and businesses in Sayre, becoming North Keystone Avenue at the West Lockhart Street intersection. Farther north, the route turns east-northeast onto Mohawk Street and passes through residential areas. The road turns north-northeast and becomes Spring Street, running past businesses and crossing the Lehigh Secondary at-grade again. The road curves north and passes more commercial development before bending to the northwest. PA 199 comes to the eastbound entrance/exit ramp for I-86/NY 17 before reaching the New York state line, where the road becomes NY 34 and immediately passes under I-86 prior to the westbound entrance/exit ramp for the freeway.

== History ==
When Pennsylvania first legislated routes in 1911, what is now PA 199 between the southern terminus and the intersection of Keystone Avenue and Mohawk Street in Sayre was designated as part of Legislative Route 287, which ran from Towanda north to South Waverly. With the creation of the U.S. Highway System in 1926, Legislative Route 287 became part of US 711. The US 711 designation was replaced by US 220 in 1927, with PA 42 also designated concurrent with US 220. The concurrent PA 42 designation was removed from US 220 in 1928. By 1930, PA 309 was designated concurrent with US 220 between Towanda and Waverly, New York. By 1964, the concurrent PA 309 designation was removed from this portion of US 220 when the northern terminus of that route was cut back to Tunkhannock. In 1974, US 220 was realigned to a freeway bypass to the west of Athens, Sayre, and South Waverly, and PA 199 was designated onto the former alignment of US 220 from south of Athens to Mohawk Street in Sayre as well as previously-unnumbered Mohawk and Spring streets to connect to NY 17 and NY 34 at the state line. The current southern terminus of PA 199 is about 300 feet (91 m) north of the original southern terminus at US 220. The original road met US 220 at a much sharper angle than the present intersection which was built in 2008.

== Major intersections ==
The entire route is in Bradford County.

Location	mi	km	Destinations	Notes
Athens Township	0.000	0.000	US 220 – Towanda, South Waverly	Southern terminus
Sayre	4.833	7.778	I-86 / NY 17 – Binghamton, Elmira	Parclo interchange; exit 61 on I-86
Sayre	4.833	7.778	NY 34 north – Waverly	Continuation into New York
1.000 mi = 1.609 km; 1.000 km = 0.621 mi
