= Les Goble =

American football player (1932–2019)

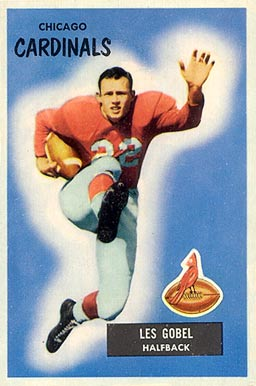
- Goble on a 1955 Bowman football card

No. 20
- Positions: Halfback, defensive back

Personal information
- Born: July 23, 1932; Waverly, New York, U.S.
- Died: December 2, 2019 (aged 87); Waverly, New York, U.S.
- Listed height: 5 ft 11 in (1.80 m)
- Listed weight: 158 lb (72 kg)

Career information
- High school: Waverly
- College: Alfred (1950–1953)
- NFL draft: 1954: 13th round, 146th overall pick

Career history
- Chicago Cardinals (1954–1955); Hamilton Tiger-Cats (1957)*
- * Offseason or practice squad member only

Awards and highlights
- Second-team Little All-American (1953)

Career NFL statistics
- Rushing yards: 53
- Rushing average: 1.4
- Total touchdowns: 3
- Stats at Pro Football Reference

Lester Bois Goble (July 23, 1932 – December 2, 2019) was an American professional football halfback who played two seasons with the Chicago Cardinals of the National Football League (NFL). He was selected by the Cardinals in the thirteenth round of the 1954 NFL draft after playing college football at Alfred University.

== Early life ==
Lester Bois Goble was born on July 23, 1932 in Waverly, Tioga County, New York, and attended Waverly High School. He participated in football, basketball, and track in high school.

== College career ==
Goble played college football for the Alfred Saxons of Alfred University. He was on the freshman team in 1950 and the varsity team from 1951 to 1953. He set a school record for longest run from scrimmage with a 92-yard touchdown against the Buffalo Bulls in 1952. Goble earned Associated Press second-team Little All-American honors his senior year in 1953.

Goble also ran track for four years at Alfred, setting school records in the short sprints and the 400-meter dash (49.0 seconds). He was the Eastern Intercollegiate Low Hurdle Champion his senior year. Goble also played basketball as a freshman at Alfred. He was an inaugural member of the Alfred University Athletics Hall of Fame in 1973.

== Professional career ==
=== Chicago Cardinals ===
Goble was selected by the Chicago Cardinals in the 13th round, with the 146th overall pick, of the 1954 NFL draft. He was the first player from Alfred to be selected in the NFL draft. He was also the third, and most recent Alfred player, to play in the NFL overall, with the others being Ray Witter and Frank Trigilio. Goble returned a kickoff 105 yards for a touchdown in his NFL debut. He played in all 12 games, starting two, for the Cardinals during his rookie year in 1954, totaling 27 kick returns for 749 yards and two touchdowns, 22 punt returns for 51 yards, 30 rushes for 42 yards and one touchdown, five fumbles, one interception, and one reception for negative one yard. Goble's two kick return touchdowns were the most in the league that year. He also led the NFL with 27.7 yards per kick return.

Goble played in nine games during the 1955 season, recording eight kick returns for 160 yards and seven rushes for 11 yards. He was released by the Cardinals in 1956.

=== Hamilton Tiger-Cats ===
Goble signed with the Hamilton Tiger-Cats of the Interprovincial Rugby Football Union on May 14, 1957. He was released on July 27, 1957.

== Post-playing career ==
Goble was the head coach of the Syracuse Stormers of the United Football League. He owned and operated several gas stations in the Susquehanna Valley. He also started Thompson's Tavern in Waverly, New York. Goble was later a private electrical and plumbing contractor until retiring in his late 70s. In 2011, the Morning Times named him one of the top 25 male athletes in Susquehanna Valley history. He died on December 2, 2019, at the age of 87, in Waverly.
