= Waverly, Tioga County, New York =

Waverly, New York
- Village
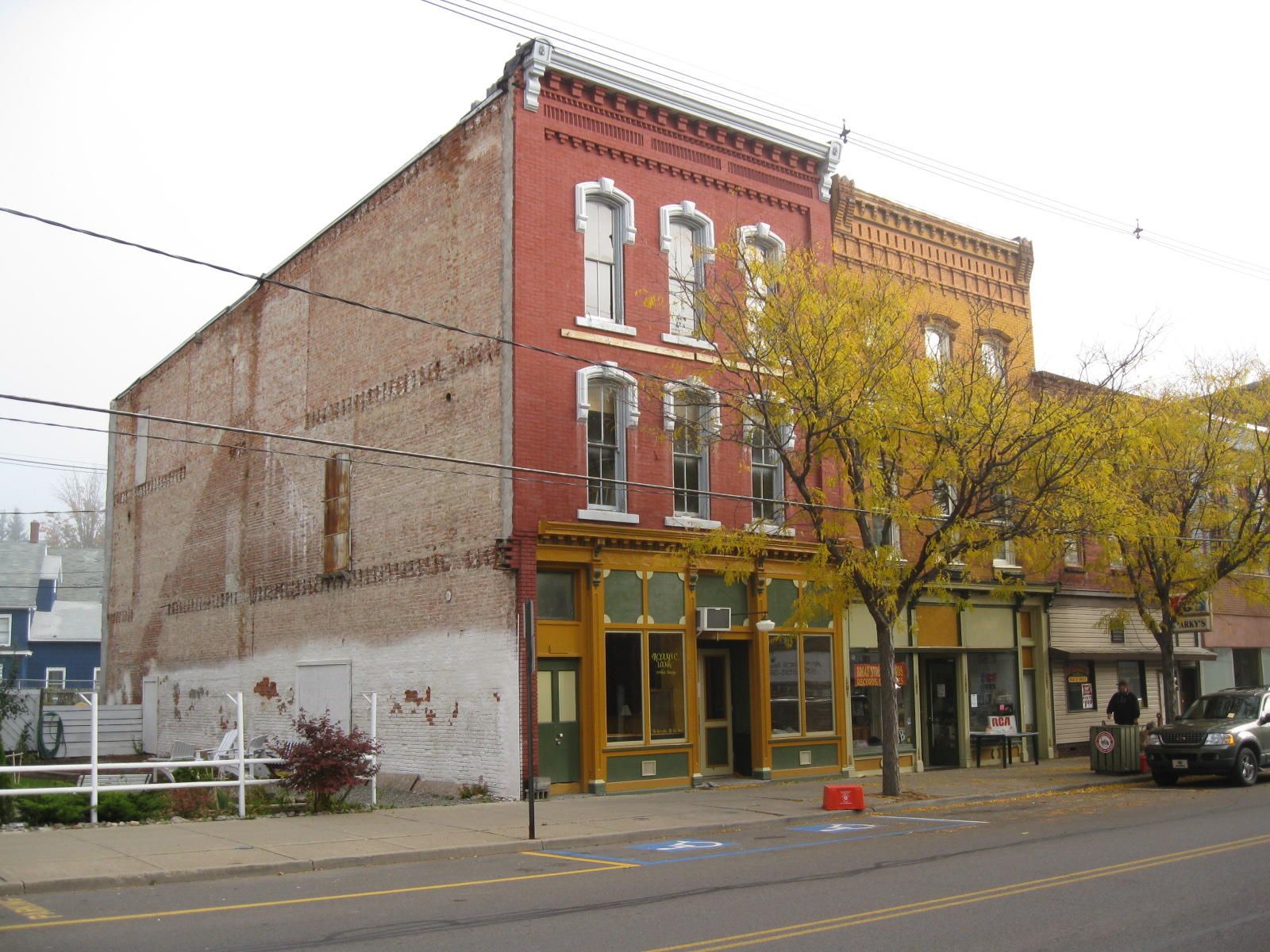
- Downtown Waverly

- Location of Waverly in New York state Waverly (the United States)
- Coordinates: 42°0′19″N 76°32′16″W
- Country: United States
- State: New York
- County: Tioga
- Incorporated: January 18, 1854
- Named after: Variant of Waverley

Government
  - Type: Mayor-Trusteeship
  - Mayor: Andrew Aronstam
  - Trustee Board: Members' List: • Kasey Traub; • Jerry Sinsabaugh; • Travis Bauman; • Keith Correll; • Courtney Aronstam; • Kevin Sweeney

Area
  - Total: 2.31 sq mi (5.99 km^{2})
  - Land: 2.29 sq mi (5.92 km^{2})
  - Water: 0.027 sq mi (0.07 km^{2})
- Elevation: 814 ft (248 m)

Population (2020)
  - Total: 4,373
  - Density: 1,914.4/sq mi (739.14/km^{2})
- Time zone: UTC-5 (Eastern (EST))
  - Summer (DST): UTC-4 (EDT)
- ZIP Code: 14892 14859 13734
- Area code: 607
- FIPS code: 36-78806
- GNIS feature ID: 0968940
- Website: villageofwaverly.gov

Waverly is the largest village in Tioga County, New York, United States. As of the 2010 U.S. census, Waverly had a population of 4,177. It is located southeast of Elmira in the Southern Tier region. This village was incorporated as the southwest part of the town of Barton in 1854. The village name was conceived by Joseph "Uncle Joe" Hallett, founder of its first Fire Department and pillar of the community, dropping the second "e" from the name of his favorite author's novel, Waverley by Sir Walter Scott. The former village hall is listed on the National Historic Places list.

Waverly is part of the Binghamton metropolitan area. The village was previously a regular stop on the Black Diamond Express passenger service. It is located in the Penn-York Valley, a once thriving Rust Belt railroad region that spans Northeastern Pennsylvania and New York and includes Waverly in New York state and South Waverly, Sayre, and Athens in Pennsylvania. The region's combined population is nearly 30,000 and the village's population was 4,444 as of the 2010 census.

== History ==
In earlier times, this territory was a prime location for Native American travel, trade, and warfare because of its strategic location a valley surrounding the confluence of two rivers along the New York state border where the mouth of the Chemung River empties into the Susquehanna River as it turns southward into Pennsylvania. This locale was likely occupied by the Susquehannock people for several centuries before European pathfinders discovered this place.

=== European settlement ===
French explorer Étienne Brûlé was probably the first European to visit the area, meeting with the Susquehannocks and travelling down the Susquehanna River in 1615. In the wake of the Beaver Wars of the mid-Seventeenth Century, the area came firmly under the control of the Iroquois, until the Sullivan Expedition during the American Revolutionary War broke their power. The Battle of Newtown (August 29, 1779), the only major battle of that expedition, occurred approximately 13 miles (21 km) west of the current location of Waverly.

John Shepard was one of the more prominent early white settlers, buying 1,000 acres (400 ha), including all of what would become Waverly, and building a mill on the banks of Cayuta Creek in 1796. The settlement would soon become known as Milltown, just across the border in Pennsylvania. A second mill site on the creek north of the border would soon be known as Factoryville, now East Waverly. An adjacent smaller community named Villemont also became established. At the beginning of the railroad age the community began to thrive.

From 1849 to 1851, the New York & Erie Railroad reached the vicinity, opening a rail connection eastward to New York City via Binghamton, and westward to Lake Erie via Elmira. In 1854, Waverly was incorporated as a village.

Waverly increased its viability and became an important railroad junction, when construction of the Lehigh Valley Railroad from Wilkes-Barre, Pennsylvania reached northward to this village in 1869 and effectively linked both railway operations. This also helped spur the economic development of Waverly's southern neighbor Sayre, Pennsylvania, home to Lehigh Valley Railroad's locomotive yard and shops. At the height of the railroad age, approximately 41 trains entered the village per day and the population of the village was nearly triple what it is today.

=== 19th century ===
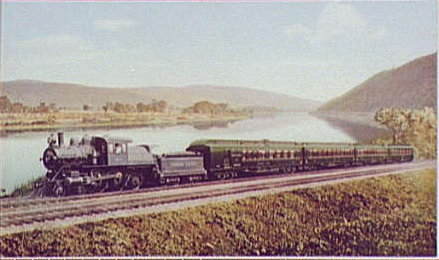
The Black Diamond Express competed head to head with famous named trains of the Pennsylvania Railroad, New York Central, Delaware and Hudson and Erie Railroad for the Great Lakes and Chicago passenger revenues.

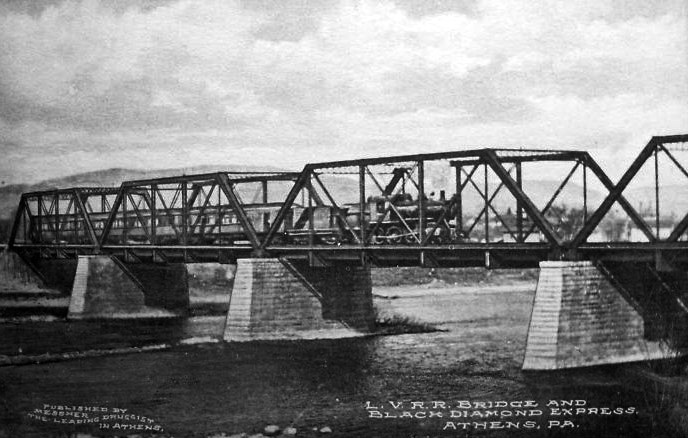
The Black Diamond Express crossing the Susquehanna bridge in Athens, PA, just a few miles to the south, and part of the greater town.

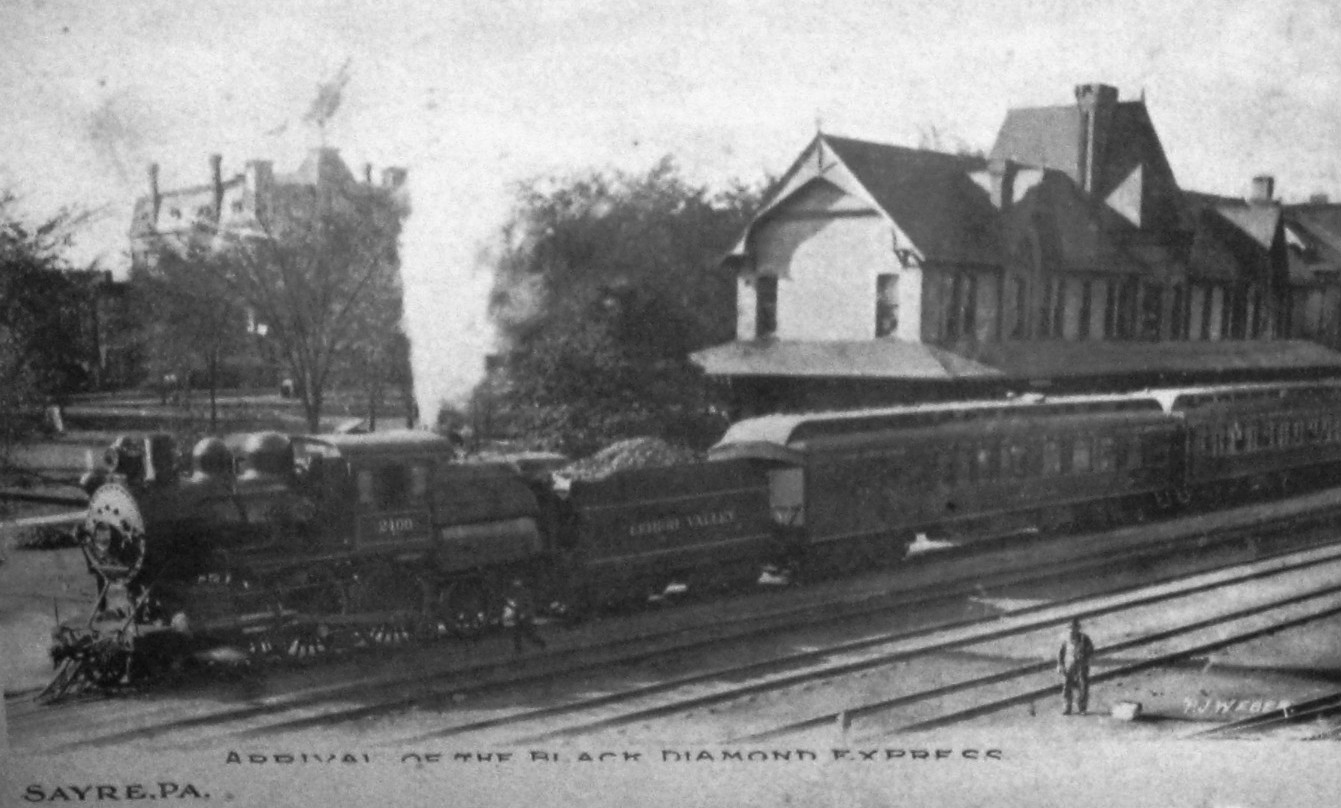
The yard in Sayre and Waverly were main hubs; the full coal bunkers on this express shown stopped suggest the engine was just swapped for a new engine and crew, a faster operation than coaling and watering a tender. Named Express trains did not dawdle for any reason. Like the turn around today of an airliner, dining, beverages, cleaning and other hotel and maintenance services all took place as fast as was possible.

In May 1870, a Waverly banker named Howard Elmer, along with Charles Anthony and James Fritcher, bought the Pine Plains area between Waverly and Athens. Elmer convinced Asa Packer to locate a new railroad repair facility on the Pine Plains for the expanding Lehigh Valley Railroad, which was making a push north from Duryea at the Lackawanna to connect to the Erie Railroad at Waverly to achieve a market share in the much coveted New York City-Great Lakes sweepstakes. Robert Heysham Sayre, president of the Pennsylvania and New York Railroad, helped cement the deal. The town was named in his honor. Sayre was incorporated on January 27, 1891. The town would become famous for its extensive rail yard (still appreciably large today at half the peak size) and more famous for the railroad repair shops and steam locomotive repair and manufacturing shops situated in the town, which employed thousands.

=== 20th century ===
In 1904, when the locomotive shops were built at Sayre, the main shop building was believed to be the largest structure in the world under one roof, but held that title for only a brief time. The railroad founded as a coal rail road in 1855 to connect the Coal Region operated through traffic up the Susquehanna to Elmira and points north and west from 1870 until 1976, but maintenance facilities were shifted away before that with the switch away from anthracite steam locomotives to diesels post-World War II. With the decline of the steam railway industry, business commerce and supporting industries have shifted away from the valley while jobs and population have also declined since 1940; the railroad dependent rust belt towns beginning the process sooner because of dieselization of railroads.

The largest celebration in the village was held on August 26, 1910; the Old Home Celebration lasted four hours and packed the streets with spectators.

Several factories of historical significance contributed to a flourishing period in Waverly's development. They included the Hall-Lyons furniture factory which was located on Broad Street and the Manoil Manufacturing Co. whose prominence as a toy company, especially from 1937 to 1941 when it produced hollow-cast toy soldiers, sometimes called dime store soldiers, along with toy airplanes and cars, was located on Providence Street. Businesses in and around Waverly in the 20th century included the Spencer Glove Company and the Waverly Sun newspaper, both owned by Hart I. Seely and located in Waverly; the Tioga Mills, Inc., a feed mill company and Agway (Country Foods Division) of Syracuse, New York, as a pet food plant. Others are the Food and Drug Research Laboratories, the State Line Auto Auction and O’Brien's Inn, known for its scenic view of the Chemung Valley. The J. E. Rodeo Ranch operated during the 1940s and 1950s in Barton.

Grace Episcopal Church, the United States Post Office, Waverly Village Hall, and former Mary W. Muldoon High School are listed on the National Register of Historic Places.

Waverly is located in a river valley in the Allegheny Plateau just north of the confluence of the Susquehanna and Chemung rivers, along with Athens, Pennsylvania, South Waverly, Pennsylvania, and Waverly. Together, these small towns make up the greater area known as the Penn-York Valley, which includes locations in both New York and Pennsylvania. There is no physical border between the towns, and the grid of streets and avenues blend seamlessly from one town to another.

== Geography ==
Waverly is located at 42°0′19″N 76°32′16″W (42.005247, -76.537892).

According to the U.S. Census Bureau, the village has a total area of 2.3 square miles (6.1 km^{2}), 2.3 square miles (5.9 km^{2}) of which is land and 0.1 square mile (0.1 km^{2}) of which is water. The total area is 2.14% water.

The Chemung River skirts the western edge of the village, and joins the Susquehanna River approximately 6 miles (9.7 km) south Waverly in Athens Township, Pennsylvania. Another Susquehanna tributary, Cayuta Creek, also known locally as Shepard's Creek, flows through the eastern part of the village before joining the Susquehanna in Sayre, Pennsylvania.

Waverly is so close to New York state's southern border that the village is part of a much larger community that runs into Bradford County, Pennsylvania. Waverly combines with South Waverly, Sayre and Athens, Pennsylvania to make up the larger community of the Penn-York Valley or simply "The Valley", which has a state border running through it. Waverly is also a short distance from the border of Chemung County to the west.

=== Climate ===
Climate data for Waverly, New York (1991–2020 normals, extremes 1893–1915 and 1988–present)
Month	Jan	Feb	Mar	Apr	May	Jun	Jul	Aug	Sep	Oct	Nov	Dec	Year
Record high °F (°C)	71 (22)	74 (23)	86 (30)	93 (34)	97 (36)	101 (38)	103 (39)	101 (38)	97 (36)	91 (33)	78 (26)	69 (21)	103 (39)
Mean maximum °F (°C)	57.4 (14.1)	58.1 (14.5)	67.9 (19.9)	80.8 (27.1)	87.9 (31.1)	91.9 (33.3)	93.7 (34.3)	92.0 (33.3)	89.3 (31.8)	79.5 (26.4)	69.5 (20.8)	57.8 (14.3)	95.8 (35.4)
Mean daily maximum °F (°C)	34.4 (1.3)	37.0 (2.8)	45.3 (7.4)	58.7 (14.8)	71.0 (21.7)	79.3 (26.3)	83.4 (28.6)	81.7 (27.6)	74.7 (23.7)	62.1 (16.7)	49.8 (9.9)	39.1 (3.9)	59.7 (15.4)
Daily mean °F (°C)	25.3 (−3.7)	26.9 (−2.8)	34.5 (1.4)	46.3 (7.9)	57.8 (14.3)	66.8 (19.3)	70.9 (21.6)	69.5 (20.8)	62.3 (16.8)	50.6 (10.3)	40.0 (4.4)	31.0 (−0.6)	48.5 (9.2)
Mean daily minimum °F (°C)	16.1 (−8.8)	16.8 (−8.4)	23.7 (−4.6)	34.0 (1.1)	44.7 (7.1)	54.4 (12.4)	58.4 (14.7)	57.3 (14.1)	49.9 (9.9)	39.0 (3.9)	30.1 (−1.1)	22.9 (−5.1)	37.3 (2.9)
Mean minimum °F (°C)	−3.5 (−19.7)	−0.1 (−17.8)	6.7 (−14.1)	21.8 (−5.7)	31.4 (−0.3)	40.5 (4.7)	47.9 (8.8)	47.1 (8.4)	37.0 (2.8)	26.9 (−2.8)	15.8 (−9.0)	7.1 (−13.8)	−5.4 (−20.8)
Record low °F (°C)	−31 (−35)	−25 (−32)	−17 (−27)	10 (−12)	20 (−7)	28 (−2)	35 (2)	33 (1)	23 (−5)	15 (−9)	4 (−16)	−25 (−32)	−31 (−35)
Average precipitation inches (mm)	2.17 (55)	1.84 (47)	2.61 (66)	3.40 (86)	3.05 (77)	4.34 (110)	3.64 (92)	3.33 (85)	4.02 (102)	3.55 (90)	2.43 (62)	2.43 (62)	36.81 (935)
Average precipitation days (≥ 0.01 in)	11.3	9.5	10.4	12.3	11.9	12.0	11.4	10.5	10.3	11.6	9.8	11.4	132.4
Source: NOAA

== Demographics ==
Historical population
Census	Pop.	Note	%±
1870	2,239		—
1880	2,767		23.6%
1890	4,123		49.0%
1900	4,465		8.3%
1910	4,855		8.7%
1920	5,270		8.5%
1930	5,662		7.4%
1940	5,450		−3.7%
1950	6,037		10.8%
1960	5,950		−1.4%
1970	5,261		−11.6%
1980	4,738		−9.9%
1990	4,787		1.0%
2000	4,607		−3.8%
2010	4,444		−3.5%
2020	4,373		−1.6%
U.S. Decennial Census

As of the census of 2000, there were 4,607 people, 1,877 households, and 1,128 families residing in the village. The population density was 2,013.3 inhabitants per square mile (777.3/km^{2}). There were 2,052 housing units at an average density of 896.7 per square mile (346.2/km^{2}). The racial makeup of the village was 97.63% White, 0.63% African American, 0.24% Native American, 0.50% Asian, 0.00% Pacific Islander, 0.30% from other races, and 0.69% from two or more races. 1.24% of the population were Hispanic or Latino of any race.

There were 1,877 households, out of which 30.4% had children under the age of 18 living with them, 43.0% were married couples living together, 13.3% had a female householder with no husband present, and 39.9% were non-families. 33.7% of all households were made up of individuals, and 16.3% had someone living alone who was 65 years of age or older. The average household size was 2.32 and the average family size was 2.98.

In the village, the population was spread out, with 24.0% under the age of 18, 8.1% from 18 to 24, 27.2% from 25 to 44, 20.3% from 45 to 64, and 20.4% who were 65 years of age or older. The median age was 39 years. For every 100 females, there were 84.1 males. For every 100 females age 18 and over, there were 78.8 males.

The median income for a household in the village was $28,958, and the median income for a family was $39,522. Males had a median income of $31,544 versus $24,492 for females. The per capita income for the village was $14,945. 13.3% of the population and 9.5% of families were below the poverty line. 18.3% of those under the age of 18 and 5.6% of those 65 and older were living below the poverty line.

== Education ==
It is within the Waverly Central School District..

The following primary and secondary schools comprise the Waverly Central School District:

- Primary schools
  - Elm Street Elementary School
  - Lincoln Street Elementary School
  - Chemung Elementary School
- Secondary schools
  - Waverly High School
  - Waverly Middle School
- Religious schools
  - Zion Ministerial Institute
- Higher education
  - Broome Community College (Ithaca Street campus)
- Museums

SRAC (Susquehanna River Archeological Center) The archaeological center opened in 2008 dedicated to education, research and preservation of the region's Native American archaeological, cultural and historical assets for the communities within the Twin Tiers Region of Southeastern NY and Northeastern PA. The center holds a gift shop, Lecture hall, and Exhibit hall all located on Broad Street, downtown.

== Transportation ==
Downtown Waverly spans along an area adjacent to and immediately north of the Southern Tier Expressway, New York State Route 17, which will be redesignated as Interstate 86 as upgrades proceed along the route. Access to NY 17 is available at both eastern and western points of the village. New York State Route 17C and New York State Route 34 also intersect in the eastern end of this village. In addition, the northern terminus for U.S. Route 220 is at NY 17C (Chemung Street) in the west end of the village along the state border.

Waverly has two local bus services, Ride Tioga and BeST Transit. Ride Tioga is a county-run bus service that stops throughout Waverly and Barton. BeST Transit service makes stops in the Penn-York Valley and Bradford County, Pennsylvania as well as the Lycoming Mall. Shortline Coach USA and Greyhound regional bus services stop in Waverly, as well. The sole taxi service available for the village and its adjoining municipalities is longtime operator, Valley Taxi, which travels throughout the vicinities of the Penn-York Valley, Elmira, Towanda, and Binghamton. Waverly is also conveniently located between the Elmira-Corning Regional Airport in the Town of Big Flats and the Greater Binghamton Airport located in Maine, New York, both of which are medium-sized regional airports serving the Southern Tier of New York.

== Media ==
Newspaper

- Morning Times (based in Sayre; serves Waverly, Sayre, Athens and surrounding communities)
- The Daily Review (based in Towanda; serves the Penn-York Valley and Bradford County)
- Star Gazette (based in Elmira; serves Tioga, Chemung and Steuben Counties in NY and Bradford County in PA)

Radio

- WAVR - 102.1 FM (based in Sayre; licensed in Waverly for FM broadcasting)
- WATS - 960 AM (based in Sayre; licensed in Sayre for AM broadcasting)
- WCIH - 94.3 FM (based in Elmira; licensed in Elmira for FM broadcasting)
- WEBO - 1330 AM (based in Owego; branded to Waverly for AM broadcasting)
- WENI-FM - 92.7 FM (based in Elmira; licensed in S. Waverly for FM broadcasting)
- W297BG - 107.3 FM (licensed in Ulster, Pennsylvania; KZ FM)

Television

Waverly is served by many local television stations, in two broadcast television markets, along with Time Warner Cable News.

- Binghamton: WBNG CBS; WIVT ABC; WBGH NBC; WICZ Fox; and WSKG Public Television
- Elmira: WETM NBC; WENY ABC & CBS; and WYDC Fox

== Sports ==
Waverly was once home to a professional baseball team in 1901, as the Waverly Wagonmakers. The team went under when the New York State League was dissolved in 1917. Waverly is also home to the Waverly Little League, it was founded in 1949. The Waverly School District also has football, baseball, basketball, bowling, golf, tennis, soccer, wrestling, track, and cross country, teams. Waverly's wrestling and track teams achieve consistent state and national rankings. Waverly is also home to many smaller bowling leagues that have matches at the Valley Bowling Center in Waverly. Waverly Memorial Stadium is located in Waverly. Soccer and Football are played at the stadium.

== Notable people ==
- J. Weston Allen - politician
- Linda Bangs - saxophonist
- Jeffrey L. Barnhart - member of the North Carolina General Assembly
- Geoff Bodine - professional NASCAR race car driver, inventor of the Bo-Dyn Bobsled, a graduate of Waverly High School
- Brett Bodine - professional NASCAR race car driver, graduate of Waverly High School
- Todd Bodine - professional NASCAR race car driver, graduate of Waverly High School
- Lauren Cohen - economist
- Charles Martin Crandall - inventor and toy-maker
- Christopher Erb - marketing executive
- Jim Farr - pro-baseball player
- Jeff Foote - NBA player
- Les Goble - American football player
- William Elting Johnson - physician and politician
- Cabot Lyford – sculptor raised in Waverly
- Bernard L. Oser - Columbia University professor, formerly researched at Food and Drug Research Laboratories, Inc. in Waverly
- Harriet Newell Ralston (1828-1920), American poet
- Miriam Shearing - lawyer and retired judge
- Heinie Wagner - baseball player, began career with the Waverly Wagonmakers in the New York State League

== Recent events ==
- Two Rivers State Park

In 2005, a 600 acres (2.4 km^{2}) parcel of scenic woodlands, surrounding the Waverly Reservoir property and encompassing Waverly Glen park, was designated as Two Rivers State Park for its location just north of the confluence of the Chemung River along the western edge of the village and the Susquehanna River to the south of the village. Hiking and biking trails may be available, as well as a large pond, picnic tables, a basketball court, two tennis courts, children's gym equipment, covered pavilions, water taps and barbecue fireplaces. The sign at the entrance is gone. Directly south of the park, I86 (Rte 17) briefly enters Pennsylvania before re-entering New York State.

- Tioga Downs Horse Racing

In 2006, the horse racing track at Tioga Downs in neighboring Nichols NY, was expanded to include a Racino with the addition of casino facilities. State funding was secured for this facility, including $1,000,000 for the construction of a waste water treatment plant.

- Historical Downtown Preservation

A large portion of the former Snyder Hotel building in downtown Waverly collapsed during a severe weather storm in the summer of 2007, requiring emergency efforts to clear fallen bricks, wood and other building products and restore the safety of downtown operations. Concerns regarding safety remain with some of the historic buildings along Broad Street. Decisions remain as to whether to tear down or renovate these buildings. Waverly sought financial assistance under the state's Restore New York funding program, but was unable to secure any. A tax increase referendum conducted December 11, 2008, resulted in voter approval to secure financing for what has subsequently led to the purchase and relocation of all village municipal services to the former Ithaca Street School, after outgrowing the available space at the historic Waverly Village Hall. On February 14, 2012, the Village of Waverly Trustees accepted a purchase offer for the former Village Hall building by a potential owner, who has agreed to abide by the New York State Historic Preservation Office regulations for its historical preservation.

== Manufacturers ==
- Advanced Drainage Systems, Inc. (formerly Hancor, Inc.) - Located at 1 William Donnelly Industrial Parkway, Advanced Drainage Systems manufactures corrugated plastic drainage pipe made from high-density polyethylene (HDPE).
- Granite Works, LLC- Located at 133 William Donnelly Industrial Parkway, the company fabricates granite, quartz and solid surface countertops using supplies from international locations such as Brazil, Italy and China.
- Hagen Pet Foods, Inc - Located at 702 Broad Street Extension, Hagen manufactures and wholesales pet foods such as milk, dry food, moist food and treats or snacks for both dogs and cats, as well as animal feed and rodent food.
- Leprino Foods Company - located at 400 Leprino Avenue, Leprino manufactures mozzarella cheese produced from milk provided by local dairy farms. This cheese factory is the largest employer in Waverly, and currently, the largest supplier of cheese for pizza chains in the eastern United States. The New York/Pennsylvania state line runs through the middle of the plant. Its parent company is also a leading U.S. manufacturer and exporter of sweet whey, whey protein and lactose products and is the world's largest manufacturer of mozzarella and pizza cheese.
- Rynone Manufacturing Corp. - With facilities located at 229 Howard Street, 410 Spaulding Street and 9-11 Route 34, Rynone manufactures cultured marble vanity tops, natural granite and marble vanity tops, laminate countertops, granite countertops and casework.
