= Lauren Cohen =

American financial economist

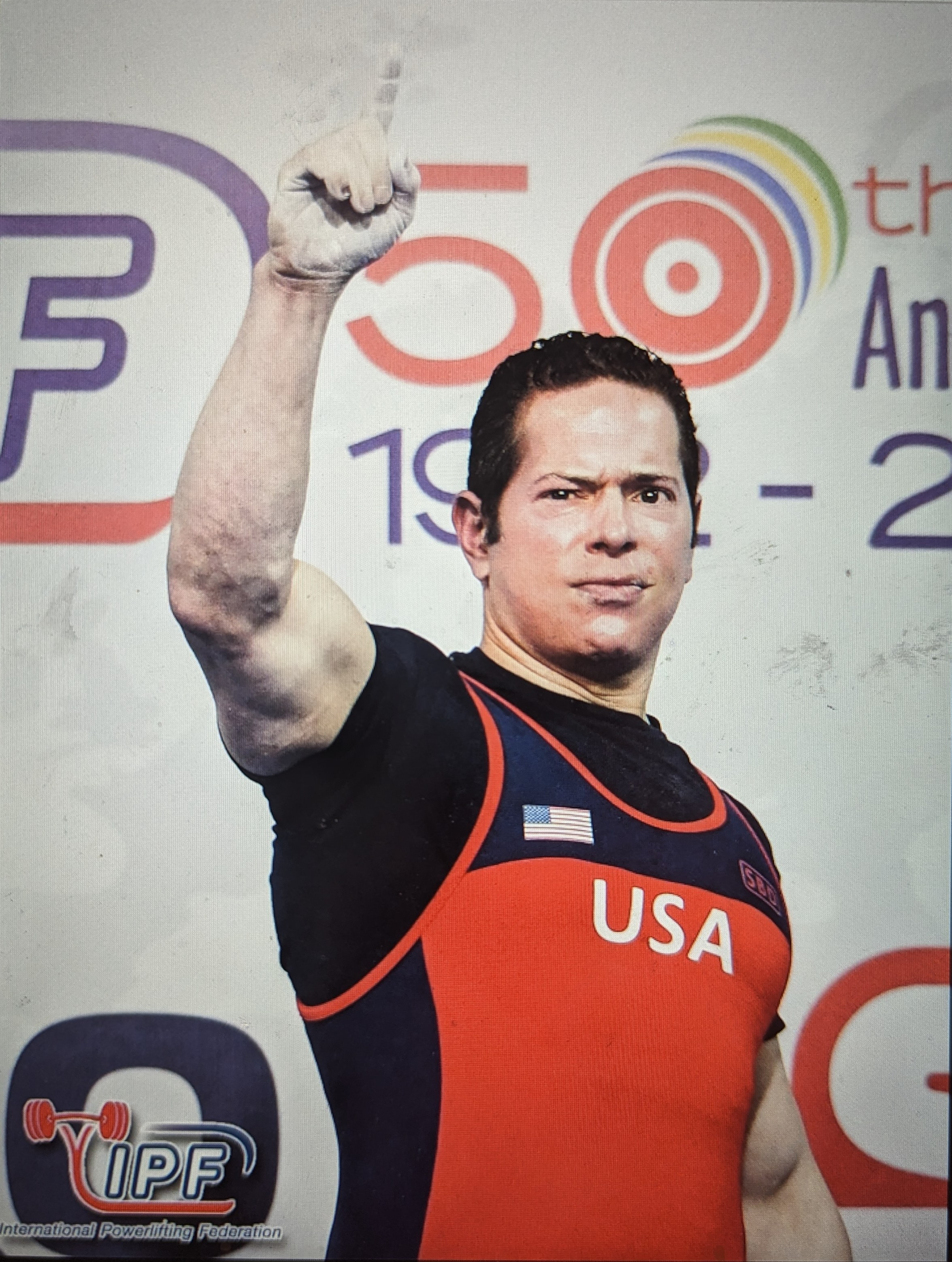
- Cohen representing the United States at an international powerlifting competition
- Education: University of Chicago, Booth School (M.B.A. and Ph.D.); University of Pennsylvania, Wharton School (B.A. and B.S.E.)
- Scientific career
- Fields: Financial economics; Behavioral finance
- Workplaces: Yale University School of Management (2005–2007); Harvard University Business School (2007–)

Lauren Harry Cohen is an American financial economist who is the L.E. Simmons Professor in the Finance & Entrepreneurial Management Units at Harvard University's Business School. He was a nationally ranked powerlifting champion. He was previously an assistant professor at Yale University's School of Management.

== Early life and education ==
Cohen is the son of an orthopedic surgeon and a nurse. He was raised in the village of Waverly of Tioga County, New York. From a young age, he had known that he would go into finance, dressing up as a stockbroker for Halloween in the third grade. He also started his impressive resume young- in high school, he was not only a tuba player in the high school marching band, making tuba first chair at the Allstate band competition, he was a division champion tennis player, captain of the gridiron football team, and was even recruited to play football in college. In addition, he was also the class valedictorian at Waverly High School. Cohen started his religious journey young too, notably skipping one of his high school football games for the Jewish holiday Yom Kippur. Cohen graduated summa cum laude from the University of Pennsylvania's Wharton School in 2001, and graduated with both an M.B.A. and a Ph.D. from the University of Chicago Graduate School of Business in 2005.

== Career ==
In 2005, Cohen accepted a position at the Yale University School of Management as an assistant professor. He taught finance at Yale from 2005 to 2007 after which he moved to accept a position at the Harvard Business School, where he became an associate professor in 2011, a full professor in 2014, and a chaired professor in 2015 achieved tenure in 8 years at age 35.

Cohen's specialty is behavioral finance. His expertise has been relied upon as an industry consultant, government advisor and as an expert witness. Cohen won the Smith Breeden Prize as one of the best three papers in the Journal of Finance (along with Karl Diether and Christopher Malloy) for his October 2007 edition publication "Supply and Demand Shifts in the Shorting Market." He again received Smith Breeden recognition for "Economic Links and Predictable Returns" (with Andrea Frazzini) from the August 2008 Journal of Finance and "Sell Side School Ties" (with Christopher J. Malloy, and Andrea Frazzini) from August 2010 Journal of Finance. Cohen was also awarded a National Science Foundation CAREER grant.

== Powerlifting ==
Cohen was the 2001 U.S. Powerlifting Federation Collegiate National Champion and set a world 181 pounds (82 kilograms) drug-tested division squat record of 630 pounds (290 kilograms) in 2014. He placed second at the 2003 Junior Nationals.

== Personal life ==
Cohen is Jewish, and is religious. He raises six children in a kosher home in Belmont, Massachusetts with his wife, Nicole Cohen, a professor at BU. Cohen considers his family his first priority - when asked to describe himself in a CNBC article, he said, "Adoring father - everything else is a footnote."
