= Lincoln Street Elementary School =

Lincoln Street Elementary School may refer to the following schools:

- A school in the Hillsboro School District in Hillsboro, Oregon
- A school in the Waverly Central School District in Waverly, New York
- A school in Northborough, Massachusetts
