= Evening Times (disambiguation) =

Evening Times may refer to:

- Glasgow Times, formerly known as The Evening Times, an evening tabloid newspaper in Scotland
- Morning Times, formerly known as The Evening Times, a newspaper in Sayre, Pennsylvania
- Washington Times-Herald, a former newspaper in Washington, DC
- The Times (Trenton), a newspaper in Trenton, New Jersey
