= 1953 Little All-America college football team =

Football team

The 1953 Little All-America college football team is composed of college football players from small colleges and universities who were selected by the Associated Press (AP) as the best players at each position. For 1953, the AP abandoned the precedent set in 1951 and 1952 of selecting separate offensive and defensive platoons. Instead, the AP returned to the older tradition of selecting 11 players each on first, second, and third teams.

== First team ==
Position	Player	Team
B	Pence Dacus	Southwest Texas State
B	Hugh Pepper	Mississippi Southern
B	Leo Lewis	Lincoln (MO)
B	Richard Wait	Arkansas State
E	John Gustafson	St. Olaf
E	Hall Morrison	East Tennessee State
T	Robert Lade	Peru State
T	Norman Hayes	College of Idaho
G	Bruno Ashley	East Texas State
G	Robert Adams	Shippensburg
C	Stan Sheriff	Cal Poly

== Second team ==
Position	Player	Team
B	Jim Gray	East Texas State
B	Ron Billings	Pacific Lutheran
B	Les Goble	Alfred
B	Roger Carlson	Gustavus Adolphus
E	Jim Lee Taylor	Florida State
E	Sal Cianciola	Lawrence
T	Glenn Wildt	La Crosse State
T	Sam Marshall	Florida A&M
G	Nick Waytovich	Tampa
G	Ronnie Frank	Grinnell
C	Albie Carter	Indiana Central

== Third team ==
Position	Player	Team
B	Sid Watson	Northeastern
B	Joe Hazie	Wofford
B	Kent Finanger	Iowa Lutheran
E	Richard Beetsch	Iowa State Teachers
E	Von Morgan	Abilene Christian
T	Larry Paradis	Whitworth
T	Al Lahood	Hofstra
G	Tom Drake	Chattanooga
G	Ron Hoffman	St. Lawrence
C	Bruce McPherson	Rochester

== See also ==
- 1953 College Football All-America Team
