= WAVR =

WATS/WAVR
- United States
- Broadcast area: Elmira-Corning area
- Frequency: See § Stations
- Branding: Choice 102

Programming
- Format: Adult Contemporary
- Affiliations: AP Radio, Jones Radio Network

Ownership
- Owner: Dave Radigan; (WATS UP, LLC)
- Sister stations: WEBO

Technical information
- Licensing authority: FCC

Links
- Public license information: Public file; LMS
- Website: www.choice102.com

WAVR (102.1 FM) and WATS (960 AM) are a pair of radio stations simulcasting an Adult Contemporary format. The stations serve Bradford County, Pennsylvania and Tioga County, New York, located in the Twin Tiers between Elmira and Binghamton. The station is currently owned by Dave Radigan's WATS UP, LLC. The station features a local morning program hosted by Chuck Carver and Todd Bowers called "Chuck and Todd Live" and programming from AP Radio and Jones Radio Network.

In October 2020, WATS Broadcasting, Inc. (a corporation owned by Carver, Bowers, and Larry Brown) agreed to sell WATS and WAVR to Dave Radigan, the owner of WEBO, a similarly formatted station in Owego. The sale, at a price of $450,000, was consummated on January 7, 2021.

WATS is licensed to Sayre, Pennsylvania and WAVR is licensed to Waverly, Tioga County, New York; the two towns are adjacent to each other and are located on opposite sides of Interstate 86 and New York-Pennsylvania border. The two stations are headquartered in Sayre.

== Stations ==
Call sign	Frequency	City of license	Facility ID	Power W	ERP W	Height m (ft)	Class	Transmitter coordinates	First air date	Call sign meaning
WATS	960 AM	Sayre, Pennsylvania	71104	5,000 day 50 night			D	41°59′48″N 76°30′3″W	1950	Waverly Athens Towanda Sayre
WAVR	102.1 FM	Waverly, New York	71103		4,100	122 m (400 ft)	A	42°03′48″N 76°31′28″W	1974	WAVeRly

WATS 960 now simulcasts over WELM 1410 Elmira, New York as Liberty 960.
