= Grace Episcopal Church (Waverly, New York) =

Historic church in New York, United States

- U.S. National Register of Historic Places
- Location within New York Location within the United States
- Location: 445 Park Ave., Waverly, New York
- Coordinates: 42°0′13″N 76°32′22″W
- Area: less than one acre
- Built: 1854
- Architect: Washburne, Mr.
- Architectural style: Gothic Revival
- MPS: Historic Churches of the Episcopal Diocese of Central New York MPS
- NRHP reference No.: 00000878
- Added to NRHP: August 2, 2000

Grace Episcopal Church is a historic Episcopal church located at Waverly in Tioga County, New York. It is a Gothic Revival style wood-frame structure, three bays wide and six bays deep, and resting on a brick foundation with cement veneer. The building was built in 1854 and features a steeply pitched gable roof, an arched double door entry, and lancet windows. A wooden belfry is perched on the peak of the gable.

It was listed on the National Register of Historic Places in 2000.
