= South Waverly, Pennsylvania =

Borough in Pennsylvania, US

- Borough
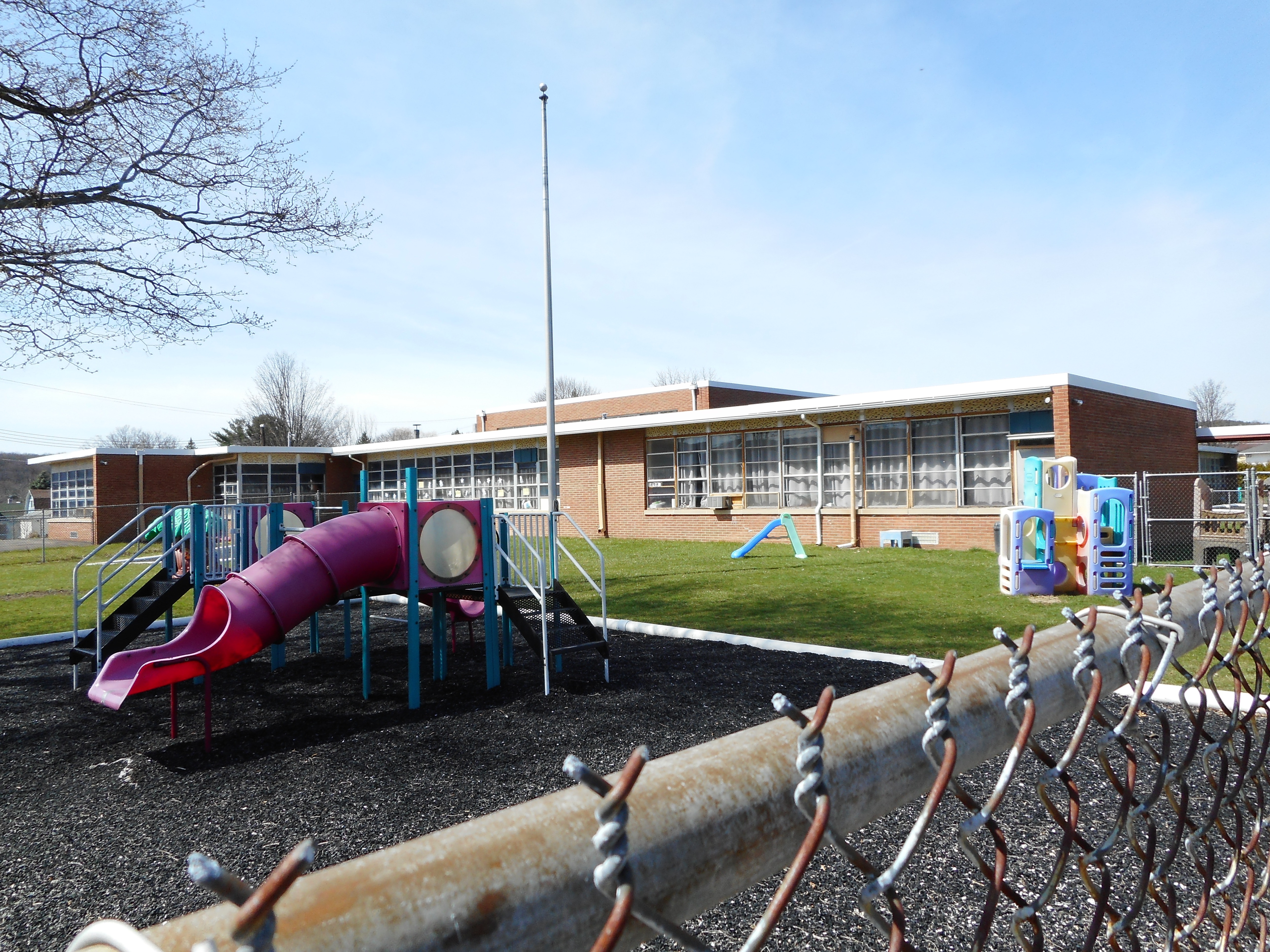
- School building

- Seal

- Location of South Waverly in Bradford County, Pennsylvania.

- Location of South Waverly in the state of Pennsylvania South Waverly (the United States)
- Coordinates: 41°59′44″N 76°32′24″W
- Country: United States
- State: Pennsylvania
- County: Bradford
- Settled: 1783
- Incorporated: 1878

Area
  - Total: 0.88 sq mi (2.28 km^{2})
  - Land: 0.88 sq mi (2.27 km^{2})
  - Water: 0.0039 sq mi (0.01 km^{2})
- Elevation: 840 ft (260 m)

Population (2020)
  - Total: 1,070 ▲
  - Estimate (2021): 1,067
  - Density: 1,143.3/sq mi (441.43/km^{2})
- Time zone: UTC-5 (Eastern (EST))
  - Summer (DST): UTC-4 (EDT)
- ZIP code: 18840
- Area code: 570
- FIPS code: 42-72592
- Website: southwaverlyborough.org

South Waverly is a borough in Bradford County, Pennsylvania, United States. It is part of Northeastern Pennsylvania. The population was 1,070 at the 2020 census. South Waverly is part of the Penn-York Valley (called "The Valley"), a group of four contiguous communities in New York and Pennsylvania: Waverly, New York, South Waverly, Sayre, and Athens, with a combined population near 30,000.

== Geography ==
South Waverly is located in Bradford County along the New York state line at 41°59′44″N 76°32′24″W (41.995606, -76.540014). It is bordered to the west by the Chemung River, a few miles north of its confluence with the Susquehanna River. To the north in Tioga County, New York, is the village of Waverly. To the east and south is the borough of Sayre.

Interstate 86, maintained by New York State despite being in Pennsylvania, runs through the northern edge of South Waverly, leading west 16 miles (26 km) to Elmira, New York, and east (as New York State Route 17) 40 miles (64 km) to Binghamton. The northern terminus of U.S. Route 220 is in South Waverly at I-86; US-220 leads south 18 miles (29 km) to Towanda and 85 miles (137 km) to Williamsport. South Waverly is approximately 75 miles (121 km) northwest of Waverly via U.S. Route 220 and U.S. Route 6.

According to the U.S. Census Bureau, the borough has a total area of 0.89 square miles (2.3 km^{2}), of which 0.004 square miles (0.01 km^{2}), or 0.43%, is water.

== Demographics ==
Historical population
Census	Pop.	Note	%±
1880	854		—
1890	1,082		26.7%
1900	1,215		12.3%
1910	1,084		−10.8%
1920	1,251		15.4%
1930	1,336		6.8%
1940	1,212		−9.3%
1950	1,298		7.1%
1960	1,382		6.5%
1970	1,307		−5.4%
1980	1,176		−10.0%
1990	1,049		−10.8%
2000	987		−5.9%
2010	1,027		4.1%
2020	1,070		4.2%
2021 (est.)	1,067	▼	−0.3%

As of the census of 2000, there were 987 people, 410 households, and 282 families residing in the borough. The population density was 1,124.6 inhabitants per square mile (434.2/km^{2}). There were 431 housing units at an average density of 491.1 per square mile (189.6/km^{2}). The racial makeup of the borough was 97.16% White, 0.51% African American, 0.91% Native American, 0.91% Asian, and 0.51% from two or more races. Hispanic or Latino of any race were 0.10% of the population.

There were 410 households, out of which 26.3% had children under the age of 18 living with them, 58.3% were married couples living together, 8.5% had a female householder with no husband present, and 31.0% were non-families. 26.1% of all households were made up of individuals, and 11.2% had someone living alone who was 65 years of age or older. The average household size was 2.41 and the average family size was 2.90.

In the borough the population was spread out, with 22.9% under the age of 18, 4.6% from 18 to 24, 24.2% from 25 to 44, 30.9% from 45 to 64, and 17.4% who were 65 years of age or older. The median age was 44 years. For every 100 females there were 92.8 males. For every 100 females age 18 and over, there were 90.3 males.

The median income for a household in the borough was $41,375, and the median income for a family was $48,125. Males had a median income of $32,875 versus $22,969 for females. The per capita income for the borough was $22,608. About 6.5% of families and 9.6% of the population were below the poverty line, including 18.9% of those under age 18 and 4.7% of those age 65 or over.
