= Waverly Village Hall (Waverly, New York) =

- U.S. National Register of Historic Places
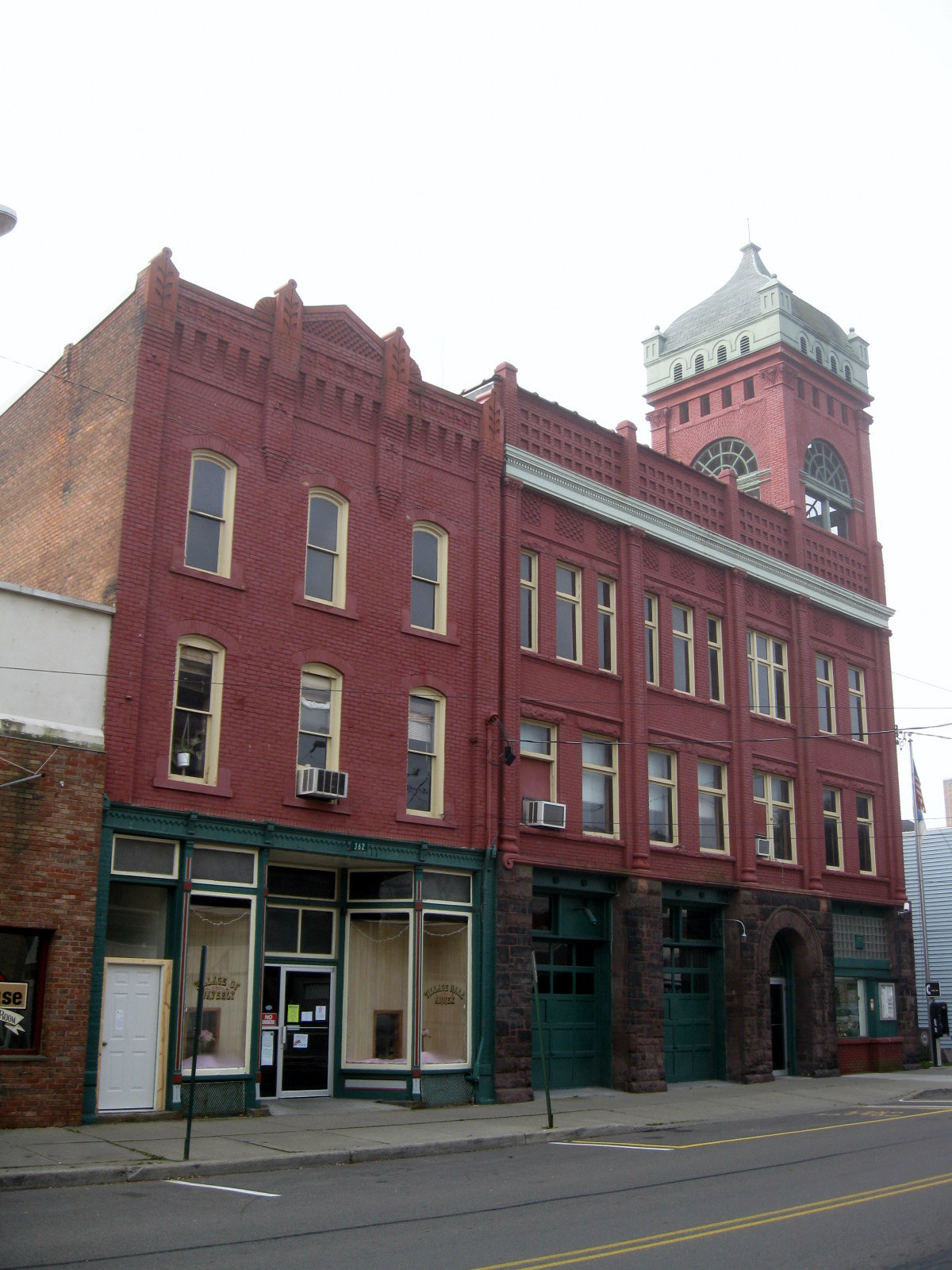
- Waverly Village Hall, October 2009

- Location within New York Location within the United States
- Location: 358-360 Broad St., Waverly, New York
- Coordinates: 42°0′3″N 76°32′22″W
- Area: less than one acre
- Built: 1892
- Built by: Sherman A. Genung
- Architect: J. H. Pierce
- Architectural style: Late Victorian, Victorian Eclectic
- NRHP reference No.: 03000600
- Added to NRHP: July 05, 2003

Waverly Village Hall is a historic village hall located at Waverly in Tioga County, New York, United States. It is a 3 1/2-story brick and masonry building built in 1892. The architect was J. H. Pierce and the builder Sherman A. Genung. The most dominant feature of the building is the Queen Anne style bell tower.

It was listed on the National Register of Historic Places in 2003.
