= Christopher Erb =

American marketing executive

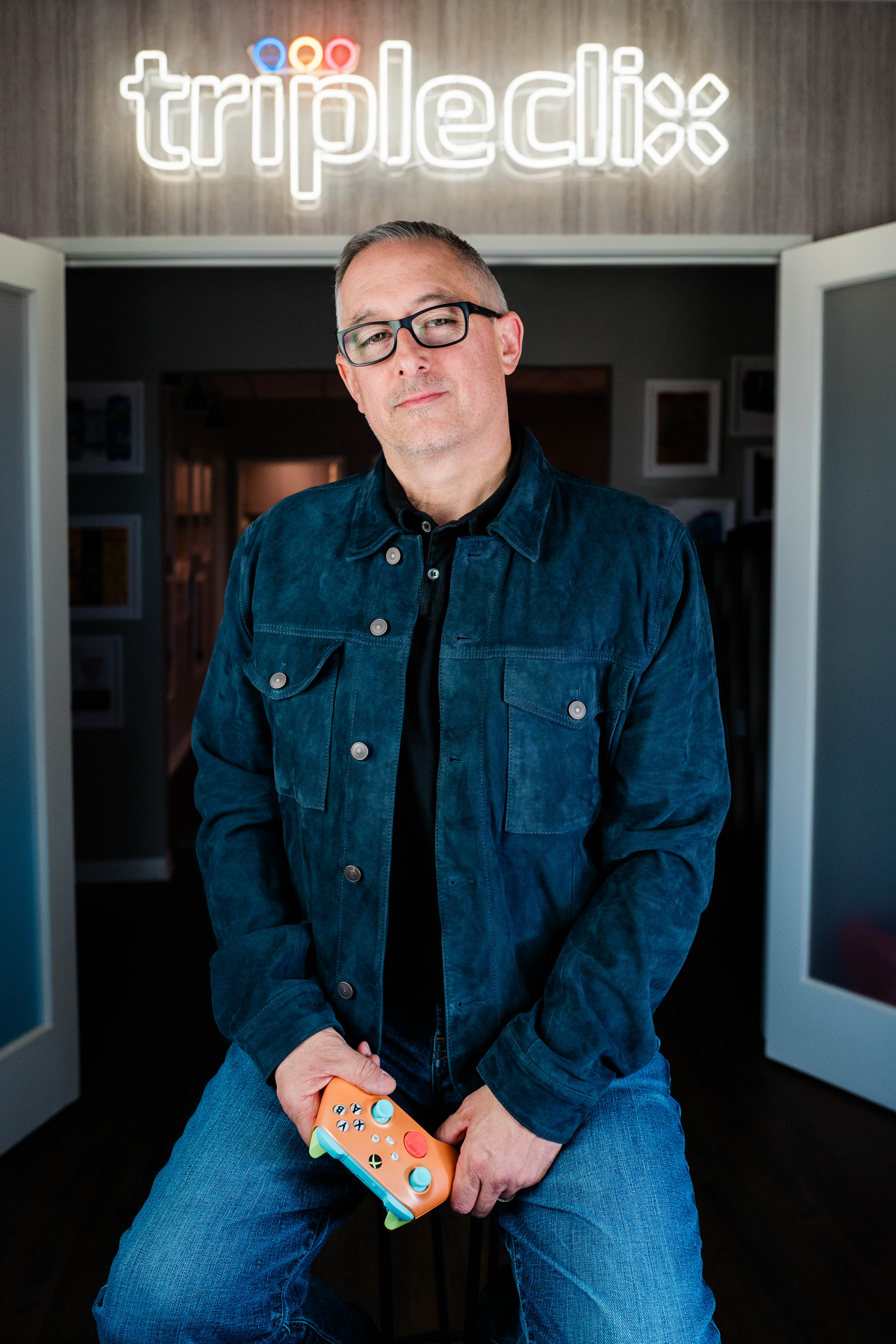
- Born: June 19, 1972 (age 54)
- Education: University of Washington
- Occupations: Founder, CEO
- Employer: Tripleclix

Christopher Erb (born June 19, 1972) was best known for his work at EA Sports where he was the Vice President of Brand Marketing. He left EA Sports in 2013 to become the Executive Vice President of Brand Marketing at Legendary Pictures. Erb is currently the Founder and CEO of Tripleclix.

== Early career ==
Born in Waverly, New York and raised in Seattle, Washington, Erb is a graduate of the University of Washington. Erb began his career in 2000 as a Brand Manager at Wizards of the Coast. While there he oversaw the marketing development of several brands, including the Neopets Trading Card Game and the Star Wars Trading Card Game.

Erb's two most notable accomplishments at Wizards of the Coast was launching Dungeons & Dragons 3rd Edition and working directly with Robert Jordan on creating The Wheel of Time Roleplaying Game, including touring with Jordan after the game's release.

He also contributed to two MLB Showdown and two NFL Showdown TCG expansions, as well as partnering with several video game launches, including Star Wars: Bounty Hunter, Star Wars: The New Droid Army, and Pocket Neopets.

== EA Sports ==
Erb joined EA Sports in 2005 as the Senior Director of Marketing for the Madden NFL franchise. While leading the launch of Madden NFL from '06 to '09, he helped redefine the way popular video game franchises are launched and marketed, mirroring that of major theatrical releases. This transition in marketing strategy spawned the events Maddenoliday and Maddenpalooza, both of which reinforced the notion that the annual release date of Madden NFL is a day worth celebrating for gamers. The latter of these events - Maddenpalooza - was held in the Rose Bowl in Pasadena, California. Erb and his team's work on Madden NFL 07 and 08 were awarded with back-to-back MI6 Best Overall Marketing Campaign Awards. The Madden NFL titles from 2006 to 2009 remain as four of the top 25 selling sports video games of all time in North America.

In 2010, Erb became Vice President of Brand Marketing. In this capacity, he helped guide the EA Sports brand beyond the gaming console through strategic partnerships and licensing deals. In 2011, EA Sports opened retail locations in three airports in the US (Salt Lake City, Oklahoma City, and Charlotte). In addition to airport stores, EA Sports opened its first sports bar in a partnership with Carnival Cruise Lines. In early 2012, EA Sports opened another bar location at the Cosmopolitan Hotel in Las Vegas. Both bars allowed consumers to play EA Sports titles on televisions at the bar. For his work in this role, he was named to the 2011 iMedia 25 List of Internet Marketing Leaders and Advertisers.

In his time as VP of Brand Marketing, Erb managed partnerships between EA Sports' most popular video game franchises and numerous brands, including McDonald's, Nike, Doritos, Susan G. Komen, Louisiana Hot Sauce, and Coors Light. These partnerships included everything from custom promotional packaging to full product line extensions, including custom gaming headsets created in partnership with Monster and Madden NFL flavored chips by Doritos. Other partnerships included those with professional sports leagues, including a weekly gaming tour that traveled with and mirrored NFL games.

== Legendary Entertainment ==
In 2013, Erb joined Legendary Entertainment as EVP of Brand Marketing. In his role, Erb was responsible for rebuilding the overall brand architecture and developing strategic programs that elevated Legendary's consumer brand awareness.

== Tripleclix ==
In 2014, Erb returned to the video game industry and founded Tripleclix, a strategic marketing agency. Tripleclix has been built off Erb's previous video game experience to build brand and studio relations for the benefit of gamers. The only specialized video game-centric marketing agency of its kind, Tripleclix is the connective tissue through which studios, brands, and gamers interact. With an initial team of additional employees Tripleclix quickly won the trust, and business, of video game console maker Xbox.

Tripleclix has grown under Erb's leadership into a team of over a dozen employees and over dozens of clients. In the short time that Tripleclix has existed, it has already won several marketing awards, including Best Influencers Campaign for a Video Game and Best Cool Sh*t at the Game Marketing Awards, a Clio for their Rise of the Tomb Raider Original Art Series, a pair of Best Promotional Partnership awards at the PromaxGAMES Awards, a Marcom Platinum award for Marketing/Promotion Campaign, and a Reggie for Best Promotional Partnership.

On February 9, 2026, Tripleclix announced it had been acquired by Creative Artists Agency. Tripleclix was officially renamed CAA Tripleclix, with Erb being named its Head of Gaming for CAA Brand Consulting.

== Personal life ==
On August 14, 2007, the launch date of Madden NFL 08, Erb was struck by a car in Times Square while walking back to his hotel from the official Madden NFL Launch Event. After several months in the hospital, he returned to work on November 1, 2007.

Erb served on the board of directors for the ACLU of Southern California in a fundraising capacity from 2008 to 2012. Erb previously served as a member of the Brand Innovators Advisory Board.

In 2012, Erb was announced as one of Brand Innovators' "40 Under 40", a recognition of his team's work to transform EA Sports into a lifestyle brand that interacts socially with its consumers year round. The list, compiled annually, recognizes the achievements of brand marketers in digital media and emerging advertising technologies.

While in his role at EA Sports, Erb gave talks about brand marketing's future in the digital age. In this capacity, he was the keynote speaker at Ad:Tech Sydney in 2012. Erb also spoke at Tedx Cincy and Business Insider's 2012 Social Media ROI Conference.

== Video game credits ==
While at EA Sports, Erb worked directly on the following titles:

- Madden NFL 06
- Madden NFL 07
- Madden NFL 08
- Madden NFL 09
- NFL Head Coach
- NFL Street 3
- NFL Tour
- NASCAR 09
- NASCAR Kart Racing

At Tripleclix, Erb has appeared as Special Thanks in the following games:

- Gears of War 4
- Gears 5
