= Sayre, Pennsylvania =

Borough in Pennsylvania, US

- Borough
- Seal

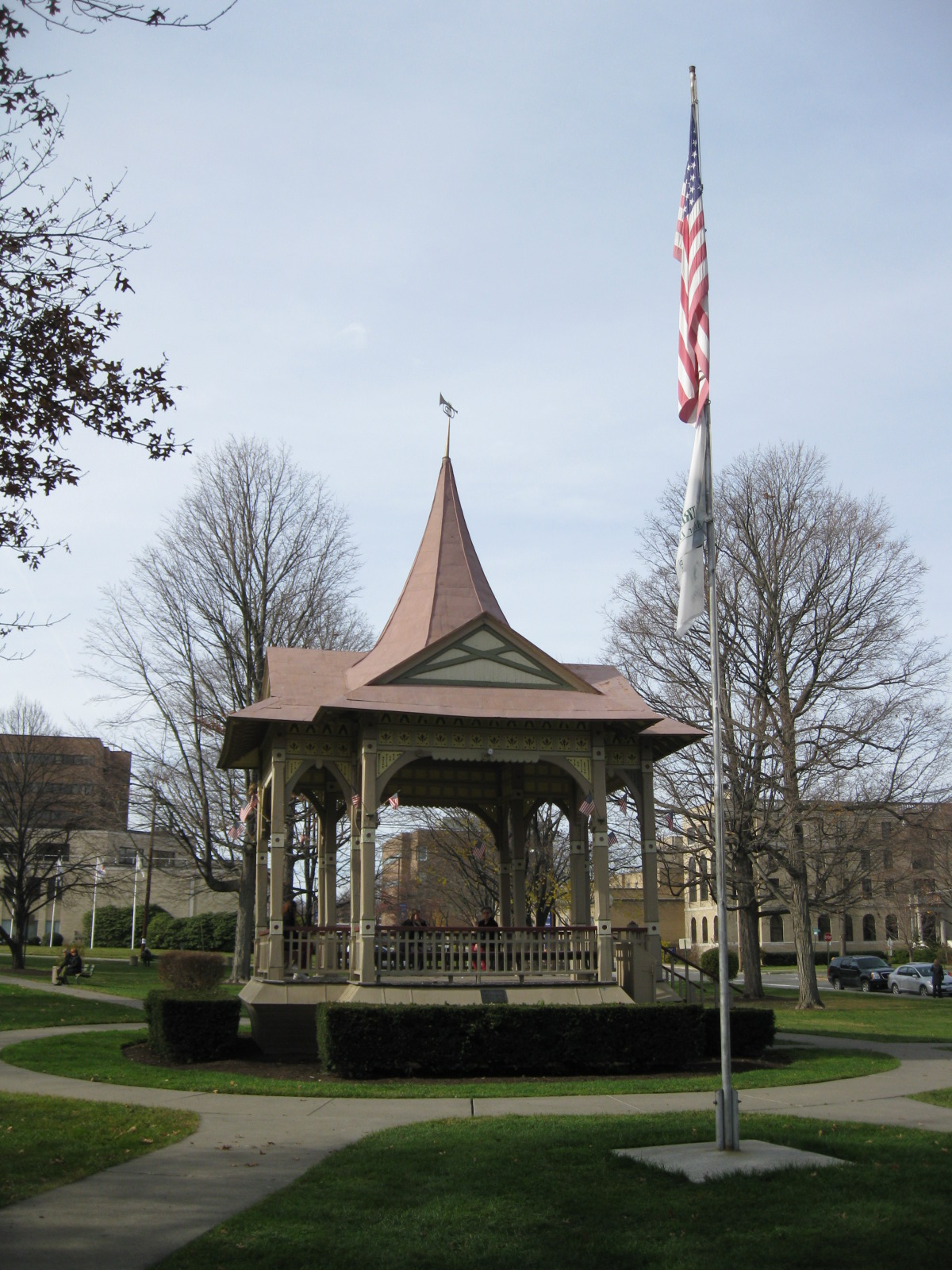
- Howard Elmer Park in downtown Sayre

- Location of Sayre in the state of Pennsylvania Sayre (the United States)
- Coordinates: 41°58′44″N 76°30′56″W
- Country: United States
- State: Pennsylvania
- County: Bradford
- Settled: 1783
- Incorporated (borough): 1891

Government
  - Type: Borough Council
  - Mayor: Henry G. Farley

Area
  - Total: 2.03 sq mi (5.27 km^{2})
  - Land: 2.02 sq mi (5.24 km^{2})
  - Water: 0.015 sq mi (0.04 km^{2})
- Elevation: 771 ft (235 m)

Population (2010)
  - Total: 5,587
  - Estimate (2022): 5,344
  - Density: 2,653.8/sq mi (1,024.64/km^{2})
- Time zone: UTC-5 (Eastern (EST))
  - Summer (DST): UTC-4 (EDT)
- Zip code: 18840
- Area code: 570
- FIPS code: 42-68096
- Website: sayreborough.org

Sayre is a borough in Bradford County, Pennsylvania, United States. It is part of Northeastern Pennsylvania. It is the principal city in the Sayre, PA Micropolitan Statistical Area. It lies 18 miles (29 km) southeast of Elmira, New York, and 30 miles (48 km) southwest of Binghamton. It is currently the largest city in Bradford County. The population was 5,403 at the 2020 census.

Sayre is part of the Penn-York Valley ("The Valley"), a group of four contiguous communities in New York and Pennsylvania: Waverly, New York; South Waverly, Pennsylvania; Sayre; Athens, Pennsylvania, and smaller surrounding communities with a combined population near 35,000.

== History ==
In 1783, Prince Bryant's gristmill was founded within the Milltown section of what is now present-day Sayre. Prince Bryant's later became Shepards Mill in 1788 - the only mill between Binghamton, NY and Wilkes-Barre, PA. It served as a shipping point for oil, lumber and plaster by raft to settlements on the Susquehanna. Later, there were nine mills operating at Milltown.

The area of present-day N. Keystone Avenue near the Sayre Borough / South Waverly Borough line was known by pioneers as the "Pine Plains." In 1790 Timothy Pickering met Red Jacket and his Senecas here. They were on the way to the peace council at Tioga Point - present day Athens, PA.

In May 1870, a Waverly banker named Howard Elmer, along with Charles Anthony and James Fritcher, bought the Pine Plains area between Waverly and Athens. Elmer convinced Asa Packer to locate a new railroad repair facility on the Pine Plains for the expanding Lehigh Valley Railroad, which was making a push north to connect to the Erie Railroad at Waverly. Robert H. Sayre, president of the Pennsylvania and New York Railroad, helped cement the deal. The town was named in his honor. Sayre was incorporated on January 27, 1891.

In 1904, when the locomotive shops were built at Sayre, the main shop building was believed to be the largest structure in the world under one roof, but held that title for only a brief time. The railroad operated from 1870 until 1976, but maintenance facilities were shifted away before that. With the decline of industry, the population has declined since 1940.

The Pennsylvania Guide, compiled by the Writers' Program of the Works Progress Administration, described Sayre in 1940 and emphasized the economic and social significance of the railroad, noting that Sayre:

was a small railway settlement until the Lehigh Valley Railroad constructed a roundhouse and shops here in 1871 and named the place for Robert H. Sayre, superintendent of the road. On the left of the railroad tracks, which traverse the eastern section of the town, is a soot-blackened residential district. The triangular business center, though substantial, is also dingy. The Lehigh Valley Railroad Shops ... devoted to maintenance, repairs, and storage, employ more than 1,200 men and completely dominate Sayre's existence. Blue denim overalls and high-crowned railroaders' caps are everywhere in evidence.

— Federal Writers' Project, "Part III: Tours", Pennsylvania: A Guide to the Keystone State (1940)

== Geography ==
Sayre is located at 41°59′1″N 76°31′15″W (41.983567, -76.520845) in a river valley in the Allegheny Plateau just north of the confluence of the Susquehanna River and the Chemung River, along with Athens, Pennsylvania, South Waverly, Pennsylvania, and Waverly, New York. Together, these small towns make up the greater area known as the Penn-York Valley, or just "the Valley". The New York / Pennsylvania border cuts through the valley. There is no physical border between the towns, as the grid of streets and avenues blend seamlessly from one town to another. Sayre is bounded on the east and west by Athens Township, on the south by the borough of Athens, on the northwest by South Waverly, and on the north by Waverly, New York.

Pennsylvania Route 199 passes through the borough as Keystone Avenue, Mohawk Street, and Spring Street, ending at Interstate 86 just over the state line in Waverly, New York. Via I-86, it is 17 miles (27 km) northwest to Elmira, New York, and by New York State Route 17 (future I-86) it is 38 miles (61 km) east to Binghamton, New York.

According to the United States Census Bureau, the borough has a total area of 2.03 square miles (5.27 km^{2}), of which 2.02 square miles (5.24 km^{2}) is land and 0.02 square miles (0.04 km^{2}), or 0.67%, is water.

== Demographics ==
Historical population
Census	Pop.	Note	%±
1880	729		—
1900	5,243		—
1910	6,426		22.6%
1920	8,078		25.7%
1930	7,902		−2.2%
1940	7,569		−4.2%
1950	7,735		2.2%
1960	7,917		2.4%
1970	7,473		−5.6%
1980	6,951		−7.0%
1990	5,791		−16.7%
2000	5,813		0.4%
2010	5,587		−3.9%
2020	5,461		−2.3%

=== 2010 ===
At the 2010 census there were 5,587 people, 2,479 households, and 1,394 families living in the borough. The population density was 2,793.5 inhabitants per square mile (1,078.6/km^{2}). There were 2,693 housing units at an average density of 1,346.5 units per square mile (519.9 units/km^{2}). The racial makeup of the borough was 96% White, 0.8% African American, 0.3% Native American, 1.7% Asian, 0.2% from other races, and 1% from two or more races. Hispanic or Latino of any race were 1.1%.

There were 2,479 households, 27.3% had children under the age of 18 living with them, 39.9% were married couples living together, 11.7% had a female householder with no husband present, and 43.8% were non-families. 37.3% of households were made up of individuals, and 16% were one person aged 65 or older. The average household size was 2.23 and the average family size was 2.94.

The age distribution was 22.8% under the age of 18, 60.1% from 18 to 64, and 17.1% 65 or older. The median age was 41 years.

The median household income was $34,221 and the median family income was $57,256. Males had a median income of $41,895 versus $27,816 for females. The per capita income for the borough was $20,956. About 6.6% of families and 11.7% of the population were below the poverty line, including 16.9% of those under age 18 and 5.3% of those age 65 or over.

=== 2000 ===
At the 2000 census there were 5,813 people, 2,529 households, and 1,514 families living in the borough. The population density was 2,866.8 inhabitants per square mile (1,106.9/km^{2}). There were 2,722 housing units at an average density of 1,342.4 units per square mile (518.3 units/km^{2}). The racial makeup of the borough was 96.92% White, 0.62% African American, 0.17% Native American, 1.26% Asian, 0.15% from other races, and 0.88% from two or more races. Hispanic or Latino of any race were 0.71%.

There were 2,529 households, 26.9% had children under the age of 18 living with them, 43.9% were married couples living together, 11.9% had a female householder with no husband present, and 40.1% were non-families. 35.6% of households were made up of individuals, and 16.2% were one person aged 65 or older. The average household size was 2.28, and the average family size was 2.96.

The age distribution was 23.9% under the age of 18, 7.8% from 18 to 24, 28.2% from 25 to 44, 21.9% from 45 to 64, and 18.3% 65 or older. The median age was 39 years. For every 100 females there were 85.7 males. For every 100 females age 18 and over, there were 82.0 males.

The median household income was $33,338 and the median family income was $40,571. Males had a median income of $30,685 versus $24,837 for females. The per capita income for the borough was $18,549. About 7.1% of families and 9.1% of the population were below the poverty line, including 8.7% of those under age 18 and 8.4% of those age 65 or over.

== Notable people ==
- Arcesia (John Anthony Arcesi), jazz singer
- Chuck Ciprich, race car driver
- Colleen Dominguez, ESPN reporter
- Peter Cacchione, communist labor leader who served on the New York City Council
- Donnie Guthrie, physician
- George Hennard, perpetrator of the Luby's shooting
- Cabot Lyford, sculptor born in Sayre in 1925
- Red Murray, baseball player
- Erwin Rudolph, billiards player
- Robert S. Smith, priest
- Jeff Terpko, baseball player

== Media ==
=== Newspaper ===
- The Morning Times: formerly called The Evening Times (based in Sayre; serves Waverly, Sayre, Athens and surrounding communities)
- Star-Gazette (based in Elmira; serves Tioga, Chemung and Steuben counties in New York and Bradford County in Pennsylvania)
- The Daily Review (based in Towanda; serves Bradford County and surrounding areas)

=== Radio ===
- WEBO - 105.1 FM (W286CS licensed in Waverly; studios in Owego for the Twin Tiers market)
- WAVR - 102.1 FM (studios in Sayre; licensed in Waverly for the Twin Tiers market)
- WATS - 960 AM (studios in Sayre; licensed in Sayre for the Twin Tiers market)
- WENI-FM - 92.7 FM (in Horseheads, New York; licensed in South Waverly (adjacent to Sayre) for the Twin Tiers market)
- W297BG - 107.3 FM (in Wysox; licensed in Ulster, Athens, and Sayre for the Twin Tiers market

=== Television ===
Sayre is served by many local television stations, in three broadcast television markets, along with Charter Communications' Spectrum News 1.

- Binghamton: WBNG CBS; WIVT ABC; WBGH NBC; WICZ Fox; and WSKG Public Television
- Elmira: WETM NBC; WENY ABC & CBS; and WYDC Fox
- Wilkes-Barre/Scranton: WOLF (W52CE-TV Sayre) Fox; WNEP ABC; and WYOU CBS

== Transportation ==
Sayre has one public bus service, BeST Transit. BeST Transit makes numerous stops in Waverly, Sayre, and Athens and provides service to Towanda, Wysox, Troy, and Canton. Guthrie Robert Packer Hospital also provides a bus service to both the disabled and senior citizens.

Sayre also has a taxi service available through Valley Taxi. The taxi service provides transportation across Sayre, Athens, Waverly, and other destinations located in the Penn-York Valley.

== Education ==
Children residing in the borough are assigned to attend the Sayre Area School District, one of the 500 public school districts located in the state. Sayre has 2 public schools, including both an elementary and high school. There is also a private catholic school option and several daycares across the city.

Sayre has a public library located near Elmer Park which has a wide variety of books, free internet access, and community events. There is also a museum dedicated to the area's history, notably its past with rail transportation.

In 2022, the Commonwealth University of Pennsylvania made a deal with several educational districts, including Sayre, which would include additional scholarship opportunities for high school students in the area.

== Community ==
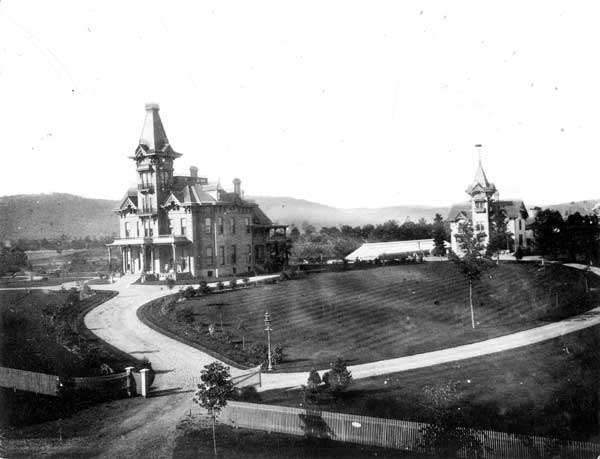
Robert Packer Hospital was named after Robert Asa Packer, who came to Sayre when the town became the point of distribution for the Lehigh Valley Railroad's northern traffic. Shortly after his arrival, Packer invested in the Sayre Land Company and purchased 20 acres between Lockhart and Hayden Streets and between Wilbur Avenue and Hayden's Pond.

Sayre is home to the Guthrie Robert Packer Hospital and Guthrie Clinic.

Community organizations:

- Sayre Little League
- Sayre Recreation Program
- Big Brothers/Big Sisters
- 4H
- Community Service Club
- Sayre Library

== Horned giants ==
The "horned giants" of Sayre is an urban legend concerning a series of skeletons that included a horned skull reportedly discovered during the 1880s by the then-state historian, Dr. G.P. Donehoo, and two visiting professors, A.B. Skinner and W.K. Moorehead while excavating a burial mound. The skeletons were reported to be at or above 7 feet (2.1 m) in height, possessing skulls that had horn-like protuberances just above the eyebrows, but were claimed to have been lost, misplaced, or stolen while en route to the American Investigation Museum. Neither Donehoo, Skinner, nor Moorehead described the discovery of any human skeletons at Sayre exhibiting gigantism or horned protrusions in their official excavation reports
