= Harriet Newell Ralston =

American poet

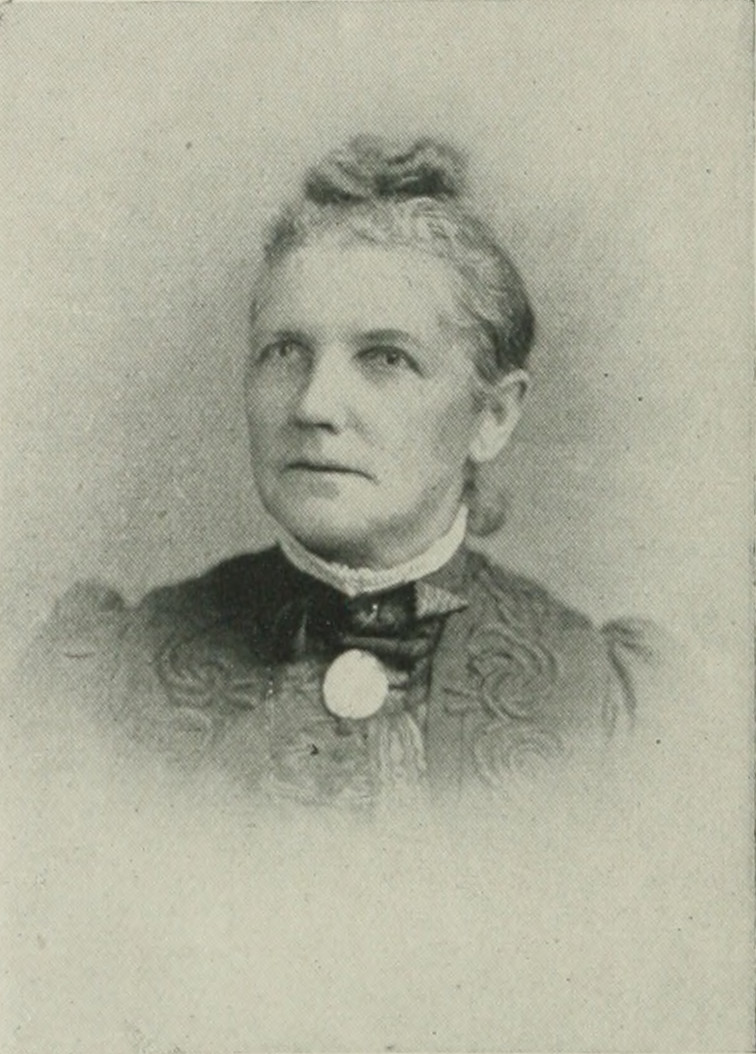
- Photo in A Woman of the Century
- Born: Harriet Newell Jackson; October 21, 1828; Waverly, Tioga County, New York, U.S.
- Died: February 6, 1920 (aged 91); Washington, D.C., U.S.
- Occupation: Poet
- Spouse: James Harvey Ralston (m. 1853; died 1864)
- Writing career
- Language: English
- Notable works: "Columbus and Isabella — The Immortals"

Harriet Newell Ralston (née, Jackson; October 21, 1828 – February 6, 1920) was an American poet. She was born in New York and spent her early years in that state, as well as Massachusetts and Illinois. After marrying James Harvey Ralston in 1853, she lived in California and Nevada before later settling in Washington, D.C. Ralston wrote numerous poems that were published individually in newspapers and widely circulated, including “Fatherless Joe,” “Decoration Day,” “The Spectral Feast,” “The Queen’s Jewels,” and “The White Cross of Savoy.” Her poem “The Queen’s Jewels” was written for a banquet of the Woman's National Press Association during the Pan-American Congress and received favorable acknowledgments from Central and South American representatives. Her best-known work was “Columbus and Isabella – The Immortals.”

== Early life and education ==
Harriet Newell Jackson was born in Waverly, Tioga County, New York, October 21, 1828. She was the daughter of Rev. Aaron Jackson. Her youth was passed in New York state, Massachusetts, and Illinois. She received her education in the schools of the first two named States.

== Career ==
Upon her removal to Quincy, Illinois, she formed the acquaintance of Hon. James Harvey Ralston (1807–1864), and they married shortly afterward, in 1853. Judge Ralston was a leading man in Illinois and held various important offices in that State. After serving as an officer in the Mexican War, he turned his attention again to the practice of law, settling in the then new State of California. On their wedding day, Judge and Mrs. Ralston set out from New York for the Pacific coast, enjoying on the way the tropical beauties of the Nicaraguan Isthmus. They had two children, Jackson Harvey Ralston and Mary Aurora Ralston. Her married life was spent in Sacramento, California, and Virginia City and Austin, Nevada. Judge Ralston died in 1864 near Austin, which came to be known as Ralston Desert.

Ralston wrote many poems, which, although never published in a collected volume, were published and widely copied by the press in single form. She was the author of "Fatherless Joe," "Decoration Day," "The Spectral Feast," "The Queen's Jewels" and "The White Cross of Savoy," for which poem King Humbert of Italy sent her a letter of thanks and appreciation. Among her numerous poems may be specially mentioned "The Queen's Jewels", written for the occasion of a banquet given by the Woman's National Press Association of Washington, D.C., of which she was a member, to the delegates of the Pan-American Congress assembled in that city, and for which poem she has received many acknowledgments from the representatives of Central and South American governments. Her best work was her poem, "Columbus and Isabella — The Immortals". She took an active interest in philanthropic and social movements.

== Later life ==
In 1883, Ralston came to Washington, D.C., and lived in that city and in Hyattsville, Maryland thereafter. She died at her son's home in Washington, D.C., February 6, 1920.

== Selected works ==
=== Poems ===
- "The spectral feast", 1878
- "Columbus and Isabella – The Immortals", 1893
- "Fatherless Joe"
- "Decoration Day"
- "The Spectral Feast"
- "The Queen's Jewels"
- "The White Cross of Savoy"
- "The Queen's Jewels"
