= Morning Times =

Morning newspaper in Pennsylvania, US

- Type: Daily newspaper
- Format: Broadsheet
- Owner(s): Sample News Group
- Founded: 1891
- Headquarters: 201 N. Lehigh Ave; Sayre, Pennsylvania 18840; United States
- Circulation: 4,700 (as of 2021)
- Website: morning-times.com

The Morning Times (formerly the Evening Times) is a morning newspaper published Monday through Saturday in Sayre, Pennsylvania. The newspaper serves Athens, Pennsylvania, Sayre, Pennsylvania, Waverly, New York, and the surrounding communities in the Penn-York Valley area of the Twin Tiers. Its coverage area includes portions of Tioga County and Chemung County, New York, and Bradford County, Pennsylvania.

== History ==
The Morning Times was founded in 1891. From 1977 to 1991, it was published by George "Scoop" Sample. In 1987, the paper was acquired by Hollinger. Current owner GateHouse Media purchased roughly 160 daily and weekly newspapers from Hollinger in 1997. In 2004, the newspaper switched to morning distribution and was renamed from the Evening Times to the Morning Times. In 2008, the Morning Times was purchased by the Sample News Group and the River Valley News Group from GateHouse Media.

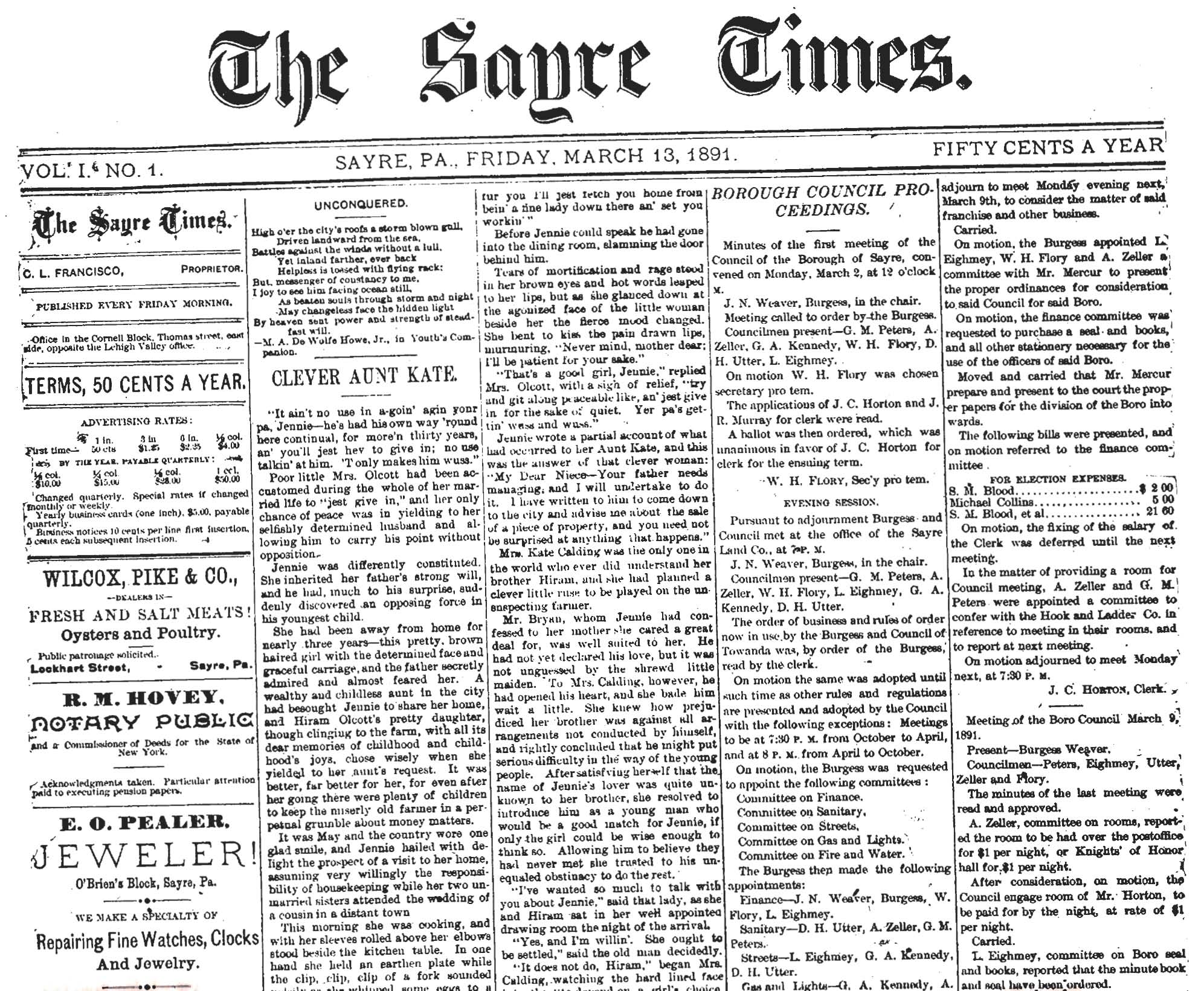
The first edition of the Sayre Times, March 13, 1891
