= The Daily Review =

Pennsylvania newspaper

- Type: Daily newspaper
- Format: Broadsheet
- Editor-in-chief: Tim Zyla
- Founded: 1879; 147 years ago
- Headquarters: 116 Main Street Towanda, PA 18848
- Website: thedailyreview.com

The Daily Review (sometimes referred to as The Review) is a daily broadsheet newspaper, serving Bradford and Sullivan Counties of Pennsylvania. Its main office is in Towanda, Pennsylvania with branch offices in Troy and Sayre. It is owned by Sample News Group of Huntingdon, Pennsylvania.

The Review publishes a newspaper on Saturday mornings, called The Weekend Review.

== History ==
The Daily Review was established in 1879. The Towanda Printing Company, a company formed for the sole purpose of purchasing The Review, purchased in it 1903. In 1977, Times-Shamrock Communications purchased the Towanda Printing Company, thereby purchasing The Daily Review. On October 1, 2015, Times-Shamrock Communications sold its Towanda Printing Company segment, including The Daily Review, to Sample News Group.

From 1987 to 2019, The Daily Review published The Sunday Review. With The Sunday Review, The Daily Review is Bradford County's only newspaper that publishes six days a week, with a "Weekend Edition" delivered on Saturday mornings.
