= Athens, Pennsylvania =

Borough in Pennsylvania, US

- Borough
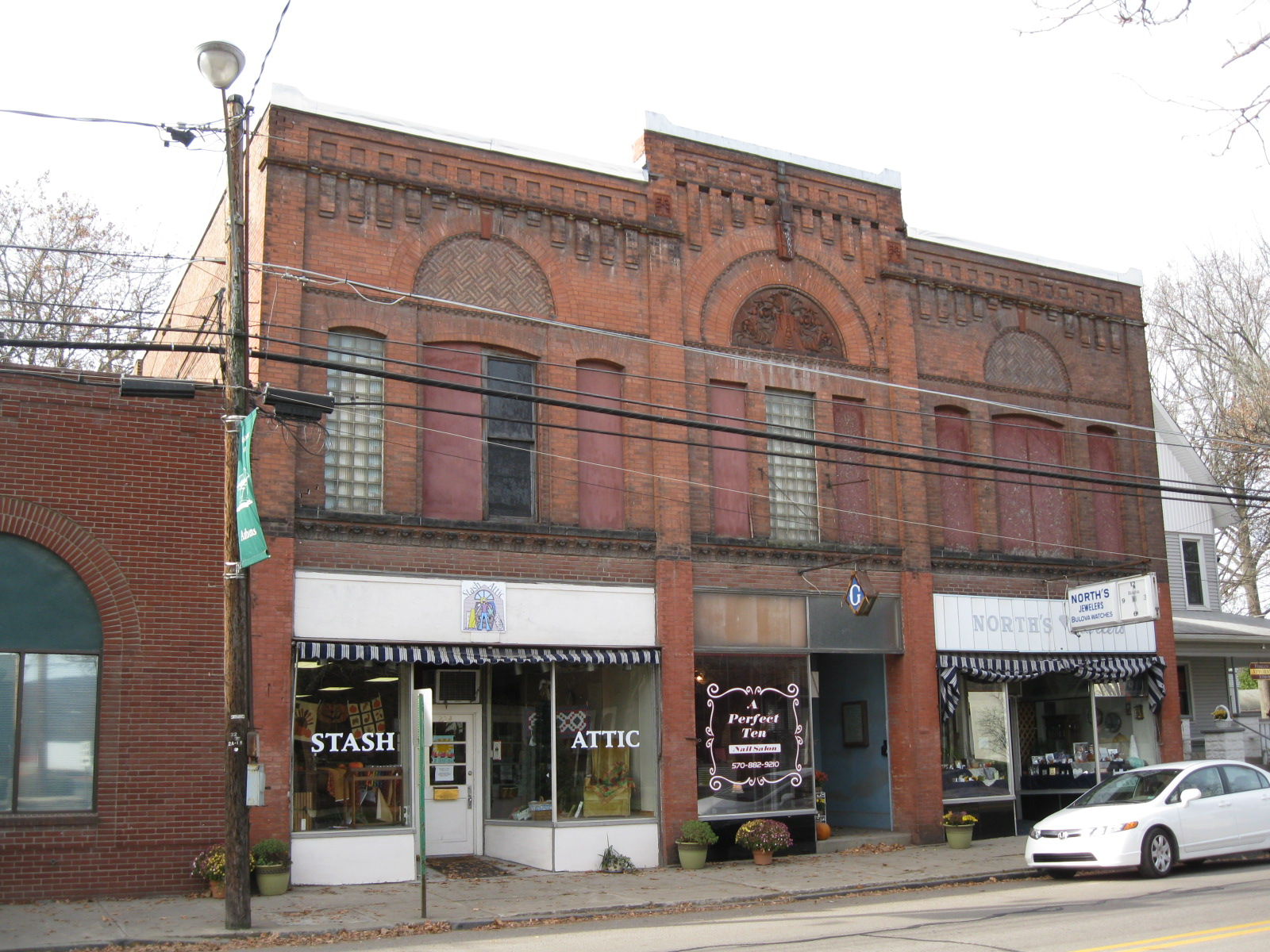
- Downtown Athens

- Flag Seal

- Location of Athens in Bradford County, Pennsylvania

- Location of Athens in the state of Pennsylvania Athens (the United States)
- Coordinates: 41°57′50″N 76°31′21″W
- Country: United States
- State: Pennsylvania
- County: Bradford
- Settled: 1783
- Incorporated: 1831

Government
  - Mayor: Todd Babcock

Area
  - Total: 1.78 sq mi (4.61 km^{2})
  - Land: 1.75 sq mi (4.54 km^{2})
  - Water: 0.027 sq mi (0.07 km^{2})
- Elevation: 755 ft (230 m)

Population (2020)
  - Total: 3,267
  - Density: 1,862.6/sq mi (719.14/km^{2})
- Time zone: UTC-5 (Eastern (EST))
  - Summer (DST): UTC-4 (EDT)
- ZIP code: 18810
- Area codes: 570, 272
- FIPS code: 42-03392
- GNIS feature ID: 1168483
- Website: athensboroughpa.org

Pennsylvania Historical Marker
- Designated: May 12, 1947

Athens is a borough in Bradford County, Pennsylvania, United States. It is part of Northeastern Pennsylvania and is located 2 miles (3 km) south of the New York state line on the Susquehanna and Chemung rivers. The population was 3,265 at the 2020 census. Athens is in a small area locally known as "The Valley", a group of four contiguous communities in Pennsylvania and New York: Waverly, New York; South Waverly, Pennsylvania; Sayre, Pennsylvania; and Athens. The Valley has a population near 30,000.

== History ==
The Athens Historic District, Protection of the Flag Monument, and Spalding Memorial Library-Tioga Point Museum are listed on the National Register of Historic Places.

The population was 3,749 in 1900 and 3,796 in 1910.

In September 2011, Athens was heavily damaged by river flooding from Tropical Storm Lee. Much of Athens was under water, with the most damage in the downtown area along the river. Damage in nearby Tioga County, New York, was estimated at $100 million.

== Geography ==
Athens is located in northern Bradford County at 41°57′50″N 76°31′21″W (41.963809, -76.522608). It lies on land between the Susquehanna River to the east and the Chemung River to the west, extending southward to their confluence at Tioga Point. The borough of Sayre borders Athens to the north, and Athens Township borders the remainder of the borough, to the east, west, and south.

U.S. Route 220 passes through the west part of the borough as a four-lane limited access highway, with one exit (West Pine Street) within the borough limits. US-220 leads north to its terminus at Interstate 86 near the New York state line in South Waverly and south to Towanda. Pennsylvania Route 199 forms the borough's Main Street, leading north through Sayre to I-86, where it crosses the state line and becomes New York State Route 34. To the south, PA-199 crosses the Chemung River and ends at US-220. Front Street crosses the Susquehanna River to the east into unincorporated East Athens.

According to the United States Census Bureau, the borough has a total area of 1.8 square miles (4.7 km^{2}), of which 0.027 square miles (0.07 km^{2}), or 1.51%, is water.

== Demographics ==
Historical population
Census	Pop.	Note	%±
1840	435		—
1850	796		83.0%
1860	837		5.2%
1870	965		15.3%
1880	1,592		65.0%
1890	3,274		105.7%
1900	3,749		14.5%
1910	3,796		1.3%
1920	4,384		15.5%
1930	4,372		−0.3%
1940	4,215		−3.6%
1950	4,430		5.1%
1960	4,515		1.9%
1970	4,173		−7.6%
1980	3,622		−13.2%
1990	3,468		−4.3%
2000	3,415		−1.5%
2010	3,367		−1.4%
2020	3,267		−3.0%
2021 (est.)	3,255	▼	−0.4%

=== 2020 census ===
As of the 2020 census, Athens had a population of 3,267. The median age was 38.8 years. 24.9% of residents were under the age of 18 and 20.2% of residents were 65 years of age or older. For every 100 females there were 88.3 males, and for every 100 females age 18 and over there were 83.5 males age 18 and over.

92.8% of residents lived in urban areas, while 7.2% lived in rural areas.

There were 1,423 households in Athens, of which 29.1% had children under the age of 18 living in them. Of all households, 38.1% were married-couple households, 19.9% were households with a male householder and no spouse or partner present, and 34.4% were households with a female householder and no spouse or partner present. About 39.4% of all households were made up of individuals and 18.7% had someone living alone who was 65 years of age or older.

There were 1,510 housing units, of which 5.8% were vacant. The homeowner vacancy rate was 2.0% and the rental vacancy rate was 5.2%.

Racial composition as of the 2020 census
Race	Number	Percent
White	2,982	91.3%
Black or African American	46	1.4%
American Indian and Alaska Native	19	0.6%
Asian	44	1.3%
Native Hawaiian and Other Pacific Islander	5	0.2%
Some other race	16	0.5%
Two or more races	155	4.7%
Hispanic or Latino (of any race)	58	1.8%

=== 2010 census ===
At the 2010 census there were 3,367 people, 1,422 households, and 833 families living in the borough. The population density was 1,870.5 inhabitants per square mile (722.2/km^{2}). There were 1,477 housing units at an average density of 820.5 per square mile (316.8/km^{2}). The racial makeup of the borough was 97.1% White, 0.9% African American, 0.1% Native American, 0.5% Asian, 0.2% from other races, and 1.2% from two or more races. Hispanic or Latino of any race were 1.4%.

There were 1,422 households, 30.2% had children under the age of 18 living with them, 41.1% were married couples living together, 13.3% had a female householder with no husband present, and 41.4% were non-families. 36.2% of households were made up of individuals, and 16.8% were one person aged 65 or older. The average household size was 2.28 and the average family size was 3.00.

The age distribution was 23.8% under the age of 18, 58.1% from 18 to 64, and 18.1% 65 or older. The median age was 41.4 years.

The median household income was $31,146 and the median family income was $45,441. Males had a median income of $39,514 versus $25,476 for females. The per capita income for the borough was $19,453. About 9.2% of families and 14.5% of the population were below the poverty line, including 17.4% of those under age 18 and 12.4% of those age 65 or over.

== Notable people ==
- Horatio Bridge (1806–1893), commodore of the United States Navy
- Vali Chandrasekaran (born 1981/1982), comedy writer
- Donald E. Francke (1910–1978), pharmacist, editor and author
- Stacy Garrity (1964–), Treasurer of Pennsylvania, candidate in the 2026 Pennsylvania gubernatorial election
- Joshua Reed Giddings (1795–1864), congressman from Ohio
- William Maxwell (1794–1856), railroad executive
- Elsie Murray (1878–1965), psychologist and local historian
- Danielle Staub (1962–), American television personality, The Real Housewives of New Jersey
- Bob Weiss (1942–), former professional basketball player and coach
