= BeST Transit =

Public transportation provider in Pennsylvania

- Founded: 1985
- Headquarters: 29800 Route 220; Athens, Pennsylvania
- Service area: Bradford County, Pennsylvania; Sullivan County, Pennsylvania; Tioga County, Pennsylvania
- Service type: Bus; Paratransit
- Routes: 10
- Website: http://www.gobesttransit.com

BeST Transit (formerly Endless Mountains Transportation Authority) is a public transportation provider that features routes in three northern Pennsylvania counties. It provides fixed-route public bus and paratransit (Shared-ride) service for Bradford, Sullivan and Tioga Counties. Core routes run multiple times per weekday. The Mansfield University of Pennsylvania shuttle is also operated by the agency.

== Route list ==
BeST Transit operates the following routes:

Route	Line Name	Terminals		Places Served	Notes
10	Wysox/Towanda/Valley	Athens	Towanda	Sayre, Athens, Towanda	operates Monday-Friday; consists of Towanda-Valley Connector between Towanda and BeST Transit base in Athens, Work Express between Towanda and Sayre, Towanda-Wysox Loop between Towanda and Wysox, and Athens-Sayre Loop between BeST Transit base in Athens and Waverly, New York
15	Towanda/Dushore	Towanda	Athens	Monroeton, New Albany	operates Monday-Friday
20	Canton/Troy/Towanda/Sayre	Towanda	Athens	Towanda, Troy	operates Monday-Friday
25	Wyalusing/Towanda	Towanda	Athens	Wysox, Camptown	operates Monday-Friday
30	Mansfield/Wellsboro/Blossburg	Mansfield		Mansfield	operates Monday-Friday
45	Westfield/Lawrenceville/Wellsboro	Mansfield		Lawrenceville, Elkland, Knoxville, Westfield	operates Monday-Friday, once in each direction; bus runs from Mansfield to Westfield then Westfield to Wellsboro in morning and from Wellsboro to Westfield then Westfield to Mansfield in the afternoon
	Mountie Express	Mansfield		downtown Mansfield, Walmart	Mansfield University Shuttle, operates Monday-Sunday when classes in session
