= Waverly Junior and Senior High School =

- U.S. National Register of Historic Places
- Location within New York Location within the United States
- Location: 443 Pennsylvania Ave., Waverly, New York
- Coordinates: 42°0′14″N 76°32′18″W
- Area: 1.3 acres (0.53 ha)
- Built: 1913
- Architect: Towner, W.T.; Lord, L. F., and Son
- Architectural style: Tudor Revival
- NRHP reference No.: 97001389
- Added to NRHP: November 07, 1997

Waverly Junior and Senior High School, also known as Mary W. Muldoon High School, is a historic school located at Waverly in Tioga County, New York. It is a three-story brick building with an attached two story wing on a solid concrete foundation built in 1913. The most dominant feature of the building is the entryway. It features a round headed archway flanked by cast stone Roman Doric columns and surmounted by a wide entablature with balustrade. It ceased being used as a school in 1967 and, for a period, was used for administrative offices for the system. It is now a 55+ apartment building called Muldoon Garden Apartments.

It was listed on the National Register of Historic Places in 1997.
