= Waverly Central School District =

School district in New York, United States

Location
- Waverly, New York Waverly, NY United States

District information
- Type: Public
- Grades: Pre K-12
- Superintendent: Eric Knolles
- Budget: $30,000,000
- NCES District ID: 3630270

Students and staff
- Students: 1,559 (2020–2021)
- Teachers: 126.98 (on an FTE basis)(2020–2021)
- Student–teacher ratio: 12.28:1 (2020–2021)
- District mascot: Waverly Wolverine
- Colors: Red and White

Other information
- Website: www.waverlyschools.com

Waverly Central School District is a school district serving Waverly, New York and the surrounding area. Eric Knolles is Superintendent.

== Board of education ==
The board is made up of nine members. Current members are:

- Parvin Mensch, President
- Colleen Talada, Vice President
- Doug Killgore
- Renee Kinsley
- Donald Mattison
- Cory Robinson
- Matt Talada
- Kasey Traub
- Kristi Zimmer

== List of schools ==
- High School:
  - Waverly High School (Grades 9–12), Principal - Ashlee Hunt
- Middle School:
  - Waverly Middle School (Grades 5–8), Principal - Cate Pichany
- Elementary Schools:
  - Elm Street Elementary School (Grades 2–4), Principal - John Cheresnowsky
  - Lincoln Street Elementary School (Grades Pre K-1), Principal - Colleen Hall
- Former:
  - Chemung Elementary School (closed in June 2016)

== See also ==
- List of school districts in New York
