= WEBO =

Coordinates: 42°5′33.3″N 76°15′22.8″W

- Owego, New York; United States
- Broadcast area: Greater Binghamton
- Frequency: 1330 kHz
- Branding: Your Hometown Station WEBO

Programming
- Format: Full-service (AC/News Hybrid)
- Affiliations: CBS News, Motor Racing Network, Performance Racing Network

Ownership
- Owner: Dave Radigan and family; (Radigan Broadcasting Group, LLC)

History
- First air date: July 27, 1957
- Call sign meaning: Woody Erdman Broadcast Organization

Technical information
- Licensing authority: FCC
- Facility ID: 71398
- Class: D
- Power: 5,000 watts daytime 36 watts nighttime
- Translators: 98.5 W253CH (Owego); 101.3 W267BQ (Candor); 105.1 W286CS (Waverly); 107.9 W300BV (Endicott)

Links
- Public license information: Public file; LMS
- Webcast: WEBO Listen Live Stream
- Website: MyHometownToday.com

WEBO is an AM radio station licensed to Owego, New York. WEBO is also rebroadcast on FM translators 98.5 (W253CH Owego), 101.3 (W267BQ Candor), 105.1 (W286CS Waverly) and 107.9 MHz (W300BV Endicott).

== History ==
The station was purchased by the Radigan family from the Tioga Theater in May 2006 without a permanent transmitter site. Studios and offices were established at 57 North Avenue in the village of Owego. Land was purchased to build a new AM tower which was erected in 2007. The radio station's studio and transmitter facilities were completely overhauled.

The station runs an adult contemporary format with music from the 1980s, '90s and Now with CBS Radio Network and AccuWeather operating on 1330 kHz as well as 4 FM translators. The station is owned by the Radigan Broadcasting Group, LLC, which is a Radigan family partnership; Dave Radigan is the station's managing partner.

The station also broadcasts all NASCAR races through affiliations with Motor Racing Network (MRN) and the Performance Racing Network (PRN). The station also has a local news and sports bureau serving Tioga County and the Triple Cities of Endicott, Johnson City, and Binghamton. High School football, basketball, baseball, and softball are covered.

Syracuse University football and basketball has been broadcast since 2009.

WEBO provided six continuous hours of live coverage of the Binghamton shooting.

WEBO was flooded out of its 57 North Avenue studios in the village of Owego during Tropical Storm Lee in 2011. Despite this, the station managed to come back on the air 4 hours later from a camper at the station's AM tower site where it broadcast from, using generators, for a week. Afterward, the station moved into the living room of the station's general manager Dave Radigan, for approximately 3 months. WEBO returned to its longtime home of downtown Owego on 11/11/2011 from new studios at 60 North Avenue, which remained under construction until December 2011.

WEBO also provided continuous coverage during the Flood of 2006 but was unaffected.

The station was originally granted an FCC license in 1958. WEBO broadcasts twenty-four hours per day, with the AM station operating at low power at night (the FM translators are, by rule, low power all day and night).

WEBO streams its programming on the Internet.

Matt Lewis, WEBO's longtime morning host, died September 6, 2026 of leukemia. He continued to host his morning show until shortly before his death.
