= Chemung River =

River in the northeastern United States

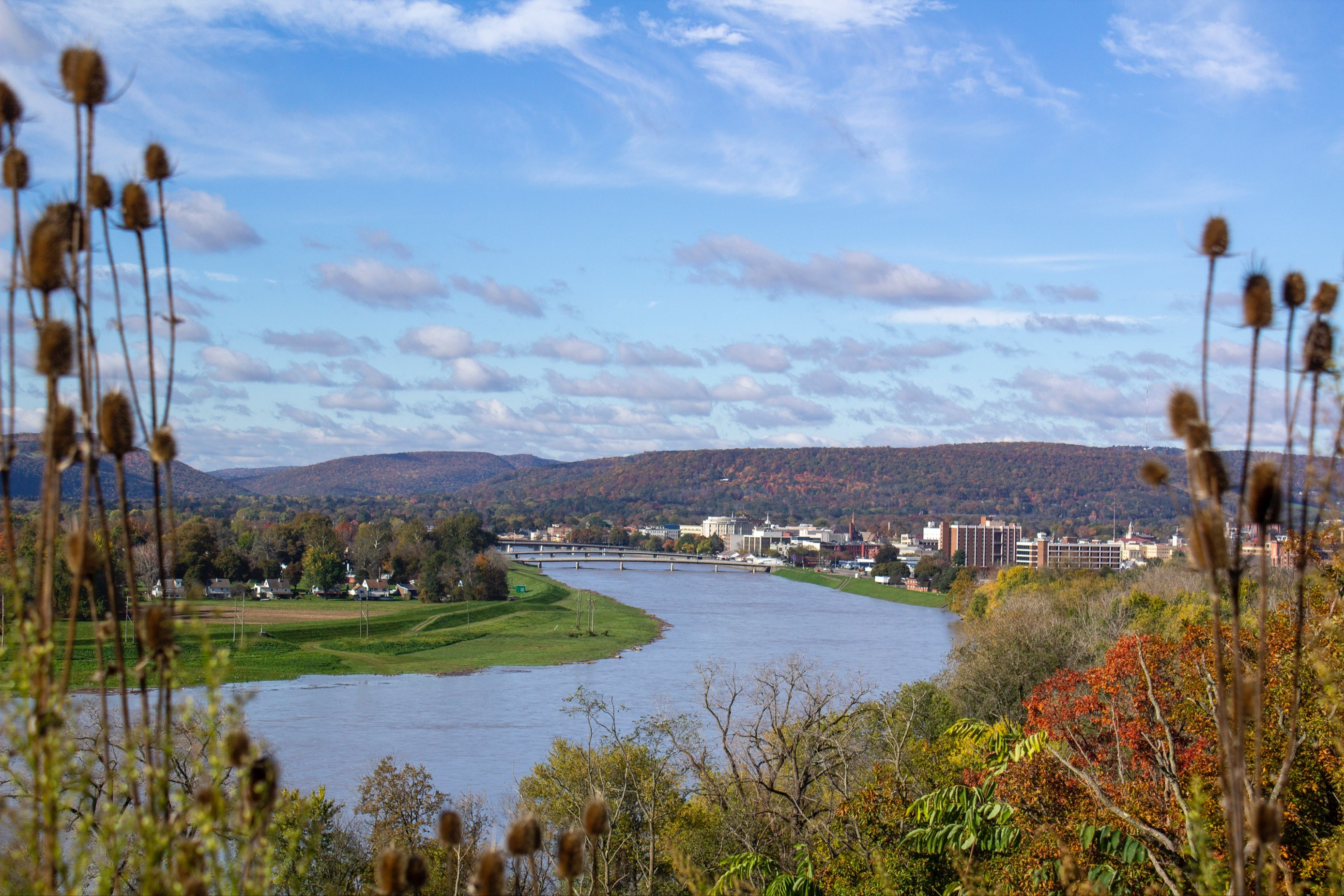
- The Chemung River at Elmira, New York

Location
- Country: United States
- State: New York, Pennsylvania
- Counties: Steuben, NY, Chemung, NY, Bradford, PA
- Cities: Corning, Elmira

Physical characteristics
- Source: Tioga River
  - location: Armenia Township
  - coordinates: 41°45′40″N 76°51′39″W
- 2nd source: Cohocton River
  - location: Tabor Corners
  - coordinates: 42°39′26″N 77°31′56″W
- Source confluence
  - location: Painted Post
  - coordinates: 42°9′7″N 77°5′25″W
  - elevation: 935 ft (285 m)
- Mouth: Susquehanna River
  - location: Sayre, PA
  - coordinates: 41°55′19″N 76°30′56″W
  - elevation: 722 ft (220 m)
- Length: 46 mi (74 km)
- Basin size: 2,506 mi^{2} (6,490 km^{2})
- Discharge
  - location: Chemung, NY
  - average: 2,623 cu ft/s (74.3 m^{3}/s)
  - minimum: 113 cu ft/s (3.2 m^{3}/s)
  - maximum: 65,400 cu ft/s (1,850 m^{3}/s)

The Chemung River (/ʃəˈmʌŋ/ shə-MUNG) is a tributary of the Susquehanna River, approximately 46.4 miles (74.7 km) long, in south central New York and northern Pennsylvania in the United States. It drains a mountainous region of the northern Allegheny Plateau in the Southern Tier of New York. The valley of the river has long been an important manufacturing center in the region but has suffered a decline in the late 20th century.

== Description ==
The Chemung River is formed near Painted Post in Steuben County, just west of Corning by the confluence of the Tioga River and Cohocton rivers. It flows generally east-southeast through Corning, Big Flats, Elmira, and Waverly. It crosses into northern Pennsylvania before joining the Susquehanna River approximately 2 miles (3 km) south of Sayre.

The name of the river comes from a Lenape word meaning "at the horn" composed of the root chemu 'horn' and the suffix -ng meaning 'at/on'. Another possible etymology is "big horn", possibly dating from the discovery of large mammoth tusks in the river bed.

Most of the valley is cut into Devonian age shale, sandstone, and limestone. The hilltops are rounded by glaciation. The tributaries, particularly the Cohocton River, have captured some of the former Genesee River drainage, due to terminal moraines that filled some valley areas and diverted streams.

New York State Route 17 / Interstate 86 follows the valley of the river for much of its course.

== History ==
The area near the river's source was referred to as Concanoga, or the land of three rivers, by the Seneca who lived in the area. In colonial times the river valley was a major trade route through the hill country of western New York, first for the Iroquois and other Native Americans, and later for the European settlers.

In 1779 during the Revolutionary War, American troops of the Sullivan Expedition defeated a combined force of Iroquois, Tories and British at the Battle of Newtown along the river southeast of Elmira. The victory opened the way for Sullivan to systematically destroy Iroquois villages and settlements throughout their homeland of central and western New York.

The construction of the Chemung Canal which was completed in 1833 between the Chemung and the southern end of Seneca Lake allowed the shipment of Pennsylvania anthracite coal, lumber and agricultural products to the Erie Canal system, leading to the growth of Elmira as a regional center of manufacturing. The canals were rendered obsolete by the coming of the railroads in the late 1840s and 1850s. The community of Corning is renowned as the site of Corning Incorporated, formerly the Corning Glassworks.

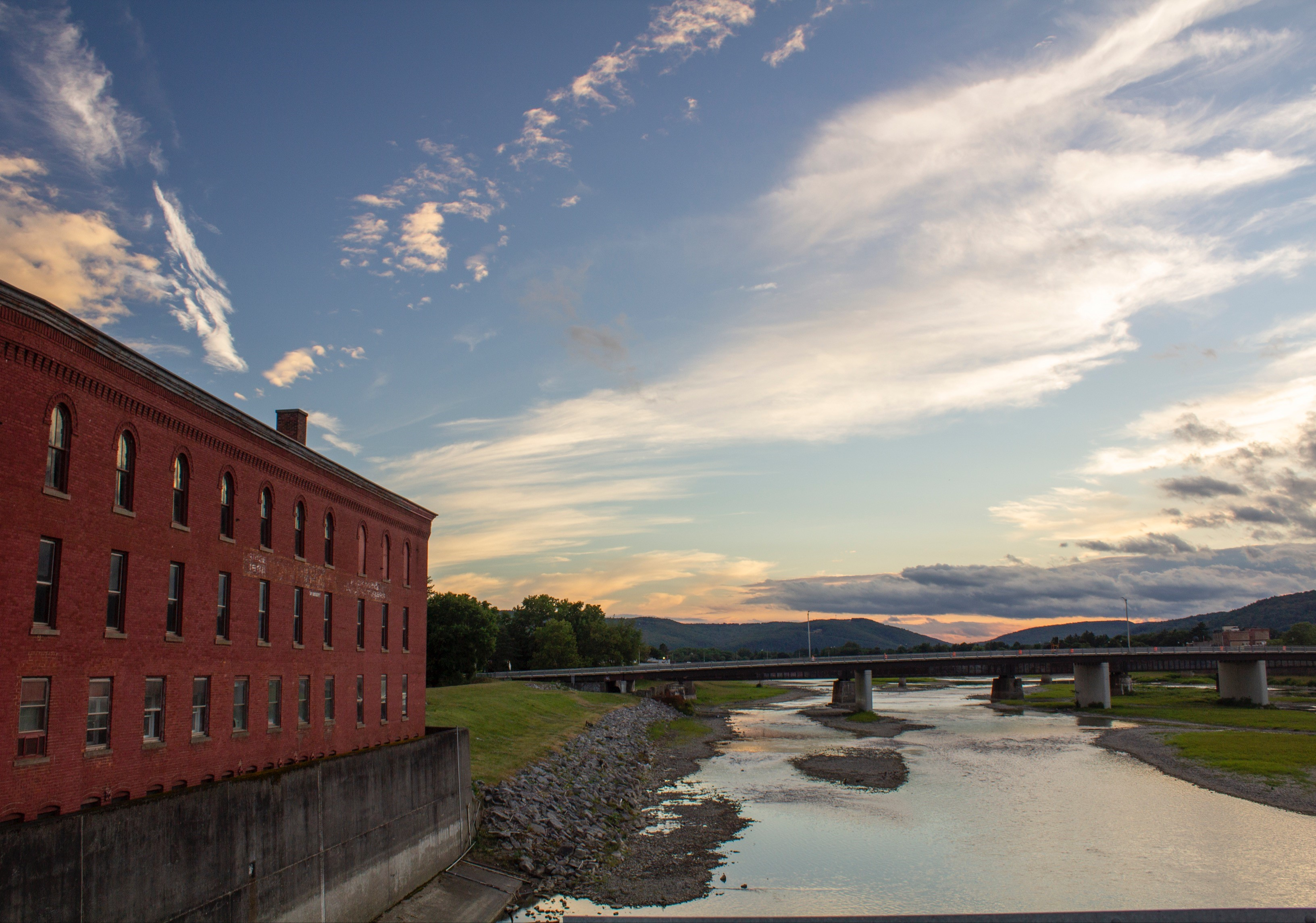
Chemung River looking west from the Lake St bridge, Elmira NY

In the later 20th century the valley, along with the rest of the Rust Belt, suffered economic decline with industrial restructuring, the loss of jobs to other regions and countries, and changes in the economy. Although the river is no longer used for regular transportation, it has become a popular destination for recreational canoeing and fly fishing, in particular for smallmouth and largemouth bass, trout, rock bass, sunfish, bluegill, and carp.

=== Floods ===
The river has had periodic heavy flooding throughout its recorded history. In June 1972 the remnants of Hurricane Agnes stalled over the New York-Pennsylvania border, dropping up to 20 inches (510 mm) of rain into the Chemung Valley, which was among the areas worst hit by the resultant flooding. The flooding left widespread areas of the communities of Corning, Big Flats, and Elmira under water and destroyed many bridges.

Elmira lost three of the four downtown road bridges that existed at the time (Madison, Main and Walnut streets) as well as the Erie Railroad bridge. The Lake Street bridge was the only bridge not damaged by the flood and was reopened to traffic. Since it was the only bridge, a "Red Ball Express" was created that allowed only one lane of traffic in each direction across the bridge. This created a traffic nightmare that was relieved when temporary repairs were done on the Madison Avenue bridge, which allowed it to be reopened to traffic. Lake Street bridge was made southbound only, and Madison Avenue bridge was made northbound only.

Upstream, Fitch's Bridge in West Elmira was washed out. Downstream, the Lowman Crossover and White Wagon bridges were washed out. The White Wagon bridge, near what is now the Wilawana exit of the Southern Tier Expressway, was never rebuilt, leaving Chemung County Route 56 split into two sections and resulting in the creation of the aforementioned Wilawana exit, to allow traffic to access the now cut-off portion of CR-56.

== See also ==
- List of New York rivers
- List of rivers of Pennsylvania
