= Horseheads High School =

Location
- 401 Fletcher St; Horseheads, (Chemung County), New York 14845; United States; 42.162185°N 76.823506°W

Information
- School type: Public school (government funded), High school
- School district: Horseheads Central School District
- NCES District ID: 3614850
- CEEB code: 332465
- NCES School ID: 361485001241
- Principal: Kris Earl
- Staff: 175
- Faculty: 89.19 (on an FTE basis)
- Grades: 9–12
- Enrollment: 1,122 (2023-2024)
- Colors: Blue and white
- Mascot: Blue Raiders
- Website: www.horseheadsdistrict.com/HHHS.cfm

Horseheads High School is a public institution for secondary education (grades 9–12) in the rural town of Horseheads, New York. It is the single high school for the Horseheads Central School District. The communities of the Town and Village of Horseheads, Big Flats, Elmira, Veteran, Breesport, Pine Valley, Erin, Millport, Lowman, Beaver Dams, Cayuta, Catlin, and portions of adjacent communities make up the district. Elective, Regents, classes with Corning Community College), and several AP courses are offered by the school. Students also have the option of attending vocational programs through The Greater Southern Tier Board of Cooperative Educational Services (GST BOCES).

== Demographics ==
The school is accredited with the New York State Board of Regents. Enrollment in the 2009–10 school year was 1,379. The district has an approximate population of 25,000, and covers some 143 square miles (370 km^{2}). The school was also home to the 2009 New York State teacher of the year, Vickie Mike, who was a Spanish teacher at the school.

== Campus ==
The red-brick, two-story complex was built in the 1950s with additions built in the 1960s. It consists of two wings (north and south) connected by a link. The science, mathematics, and music departments along with the cafeteria, pool, library, main and guidance offices, auditorium, and a gym are located in the north wing. The humanities departments, along with another gym, are located in the south wing. Architecturally, the building is without a main facade and a central location, and going from one wing to another (a path that would roughly follow the perimeter of the central parking lot), is not a direct route. Formerly students were able to cross this central parking lot to get to class, but this policy has been discontinued due to safety concerns. The high school contains two gyms, each with a regulation sized basketball court, and room for approximately 500 people. The high school also contains a weight room with an extensive collection of aerobic, cardiovascular and free weight equipment. A regulation 25-yard pool also is within Horseheads High School. It is used by a variety of groups, and is open to the general public at a variety of dates and times. Adjacent to the high school, are the outdoor athletic facilities. Directly behind the school, bordered by Interstate 86 and Norfolk Southern Railway, is the main complex for soccer and lacrosse, and can accommodate up to three fields and a large area for practices. The football and baseball complex, are bordered by a bus garage access road, and youth baseball fields. Basketball games are held in the Horseheads Middle School gym because it's much larger.

The Middle School also houses a fieldhouse with a large center area for volleyball, soccer, basketball, etc., a small indoor track, and an indoor/outdoor golf chipping and putting area designed by Joe Sindelar (father of PGA golfer Joey Sindelar) and funded by a grant from the First Tee Program and the LPGA.

== Academics ==
Horseheads High School is one of the best public schools in Upstate New York, with students going on to attend top universities, including Princeton University, Duke University, University of Pennsylvania, Syracuse University, Cornell University, University of Notre Dame, Amherst College, United States Naval Academy, George Mason University, Ohio State University, and more. Since 2007, the school has had students matriculate at five of the top ten national universities, according to 2013 U.S. News & World Report magazine figures (Harvard University, Princeton University, Columbia University, Duke University, and University of Pennsylvania). The school was also ranked on the College Board's AP Course honor roll, awarded to only 425 schools in North America, and 25 in New York State.

The Horseheads Central School District altogether has been named one of the best 100 school districts in the United States for music education. This program has worked with guest conductors and composers such as Douglas Akey, Frank Ticheli, Andrew Boysen, Jr., David Holsinger, Chris Tucker, and Timothy Mahr.

== Notable alumni ==
- Chris Friend, politician, and member of the New York State Assembly
- Guilian Gary, football coach for the Towson Tigers
- Joe Gilbert, football coach for the Carolina Panthers
- Greg Keagle, former professional baseball player for the Detroit Tigers
- Chad Lefkowitz-Brown, saxophonist, and recording artists
- Kirt Manwaring, former professional baseball player for the San Francisco Giants
- Rose McAdoo, pastry chef and Antarctic facility manager
- Tom O'Mara, lawyer, and politician; member of the New York State Senate
- Jeff Plate, former drummer of Metal Church
- Tom Reed, lobbyist, attorney, and politician; former U.S. Congressman
- Joe Scarborough, television host, attorney, political commentator, and former politician; co-host of Morning Joe on MSNBC
- Joey Sindelar, professional golfer who played on the PGA Tour
- William E. Tuttle Jr., U.S. Representative from New Jersey
- Jason Wise, dancer, choreographer, and theatre director
