= Crandall House =

Crandall House may refer to the following NRHP-listed houses in the United States:

- Prudence Crandall House, Canterbury, Connecticut
- Louis A. Crandall House, Lebanon, Oregon
- Lorenzo Crandall House, Pawtucket, Rhode Island
- Crandall Houses of Springville, Utah (Clarence L. Crandall House and Nelson D. Crandall House

== See also ==
- Crandall Farm Complex, Cazenovia, New York
- Lattin-Crandall Octagon Barn, Catherine, New York
