= Cayuta =

Cayuta may refer to:

In New York:

- Cayuta, New York, a village in Schuyler County
- Cayuta Creek, a tributary of the North Branch of the Susquehanna River
- Cayuta Lake, in Schuyler County
