= Horseheads Central School District =

School district in New York, United States

Location
- Horseheads, New York Southern Tier United States

District information
- Type: Public
- Motto: "Quality Education for All"
- Grades: Pre-kindergarten, K-12
- Established: April 27, 1950
- Superintendent: Thomas Douglas
- Accreditation: Middle States Association of Colleges and Schools New York State Board of Regents
- Budget: $73,641,191 (2015-2016 Adopted Budget)
- NCES District ID: 3614850

Students and staff
- Students: 4,247
- Student–teacher ratio: student/teacher: 14.37
- Athletic conference: NYSPHAA Southern Tier Athletic Conference
- District mascot: Horseheads Blue Raiders
- Colors: Blue and White

Other information
- Website: www.horseheadsdistrict.com

Horseheads Central School District is a school district in Horseheads, New York. It is one of three districts in Chemung County, located in Upstate New York's Southern Tier Region. The district has an estimated population of 25,000, spanning some 143 square miles. The district serves the towns of Big Flats, Catlin, Cayuta, Erin, Horseheads, and Veteran; the villages of Horseheads and Millport; and the hamlets of Breesport and Pine Valley, all in Chemung County. Thomas Douglas is Superintendent of Schools.

It has been named one of the best 100 school districts in the United States for Music Education in the United States. This program has worked with guest conductors and composers such as Douglas Akey, Frank Ticheli, Andrew Boysen, David Holsinger, Chris Tucker, and Timothy Mahr.

== Board of education ==
The board is made up of nine voting members elected by the community and one student representative, a non-voting member appointed by the superintendent. Current board members are:

- Warren Conklin, President
- Elizabeth O'Dell, Vice President
- MaryAnne Corbett
- Daniel Christmas
- Kristine Dale
- Julie Monahan
- Erin Schiavone
- Katrina Ungvarsky
- Susan Ungvarsky
- Mia Sophia, Student Representative

== Schools ==
It operates four elementary schools, one intermediate school, one middle school, and one high school.

- Big Flats Elementary School, Principal - Elizabeth Scaptura
- Center Street Elementary School, Principal - Patricia Sotero
- Gardner Road Elementary School, Principal - Patrick Patterson
- Ridge Road Elementary School, Principal - Anne-Marie Manikowski-Bailey
- Horseheads Intermediate School (Grades 5–6), Principal - Michael Bostwick
- Horseheads Middle School (Grades 7–8), Principal - Ron Holloway
- Horseheads High School (Grades 9–12), Principal - Kris Earl

== Athletics ==
Horseheads Schools participate in the NYSPHAA Southern Tier Athletic Conference. The school district has 26 athletic teams, spread out over three seasons.

Fall Sports:

- Boys Football
- Mixed Cheerleading
- Boys Cross Country
- Girls Cross Country
- Boys Soccer
- Girls Soccer
- Boys Golf
- Girls Swimming
- Girls Tennis
- Boys Volleyball
- Girls Volleyball

Winter Sports:

- Boys Basketball
- Girls Basketball
- Boys Wrestling
- Girls Bowling
- Boys Bowling
- Boys Swimming
- Mixed Indoor Track
- Mixed Cheerleading

Spring Sports:

- Boys Baseball
- Girls Softball
- Boys Lacrosse
- Girls Lacrosse
- Boys Tennis
- Girls Golf
- Boys Track and Field
- Girls Track and Field

== See also ==
List of school districts in New York
