= Southport (CDP), New York =

Southport, New York
- Census-designated place
- Location within New York Location within the United States
- Coordinates: 42°3′17.3″N 76°49′8.8″W
- Country: United States
- State: New York
- County: Chemung
- Town: Southport

Area
  - Total: 6.59 sq mi (17.08 km^{2})
  - Land: 6.37 sq mi (16.51 km^{2})
  - Water: 0.22 sq mi (0.57 km^{2})
- Elevation: 889 ft (271 m)

Population (2020)
  - Total: 6,782
  - Density: 1,064/sq mi (410.7/km^{2})
- Time zone: UTC-5 (Eastern (EST))
  - Summer (DST): UTC-4 (EDT)
- ZIP Codes: 14904 (Elmira); 14871 (Pine City)
- FIPS code: 36-69606
- GNIS feature ID: 0965913

Southport is a census-designated place (CDP) in the town of Southport in Chemung County, New York, United States. The population of the CDP was 7,238 at the 2010 census, out of a total population in the town of 10,940.

== Railroad history ==
The Pennsylvania Railroad, for many decades, had a yard in Southport. This yard, closed in the 1970s, served the PRR's famed Elmira Branch. Trains to and from Williamsport, Pennsylvania, Canandaigua, and Sodus Point originated and terminated here. Just north of Southport, the PRR shared track with the Erie Railroad through downtown Elmira. The yard also served the New York Central Railroad, which had trackage rights on the PRR north of Elmira. It was a major crew terminal for the PRR especially, and was quite large, with extensive facilities. It covered most of Southport. The Elmira Branch was one of the last holdouts of steam locomotives on the PRR, and they could be seen here almost until the end of PRR steam in 1957.

After Hurricane Agnes destroyed bridges south of Elmira on the branch, PRR successor Penn Central decided to abandon the Elmira Branch south of Elmira, and the yard was closed. Nothing remains of the yard today.

== Geography ==
The Southport CDP is located in the northeast corner of the town of Southport at 42°3′47″N 76°48′25″W (42.063124, -76.807127). It is bordered to the north by the city of Elmira and forms a continuous area of urban development with it. The Chemung River, a tributary of the Susquehanna River, forms the remainder of the northern edge of the Southport CDP, with the community of West Elmira to the north across the river.

According to the United States Census Bureau, the Southport CDP has a total area of 6.6 square miles (17.1 km^{2}), of which 6.4 square miles (16.5 km^{2}) is land and 0.23 square miles (0.6 km^{2}), or 3.61%, is water.

== Demographics ==
Historical population
Census	Pop.	Note	%±
2020	6,782		—
U.S. Decennial Census

As of the census of 2000, there were 7,396 people, 3,133 households, and 2,039 families residing in the CDP. The population density was 1,124.9 inhabitants per square mile (434.3/km^{2}). There were 3,265 housing units at an average density of 496.6 per square mile (191.7/km^{2}). The racial makeup of the CDP was 96.19% White, 1.91% Black or African American, 0.22% Native American, 0.30% Asian, 0.05% Pacific Islander, 0.42% from other races, and 0.92% from two or more races. Hispanic or Latino of any race were 0.73% of the population.

There were 3,133 households, out of which 27.5% had children under the age of 18 living with them, 49.5% were married couples living together, 11.6% had a female householder with no husband present, and 34.9% were non-families. 29.6% of all households were made up of individuals, and 13.9% had someone living alone who was 65 years of age or older. The average household size was 2.33 and the average family size was 2.85.

In the CDP, the population was spread out, with 22.8% under the age of 18, 7.2% from 18 to 24, 25.6% from 25 to 44, 24.7% from 45 to 64, and 19.7% who were 65 years of age or older. The median age was 42 years. For every 100 females, there were 89.3 males. For every 100 females age 18 and over, there were 85.6 males.

The median income for a household in the CDP was $34,899, and the median income for a family was $40,396. Males had a median income of $31,194 versus $23,920 for females. The per capita income for the CDP was $17,876. About 11.2% of families and 14.2% of the population were below the poverty line, including 22.1% of those under age 18 and 4.0% of those age 65 or over.

== Education ==
It is in the Elmira City School District.

As of 2004 there are several zoned elementary schools that take sections of the CDP: Broadway, Parley Coburn, Pine City, and Riverside. The zoned middle and high schools for the entire school district are Broadway Academy (grade 7), Ernie Davis Academy (grades 8–9), and Elmira High School (grades 10–12). Prior to 2014, the school district had two sets of middle and high schools, with students south of the Chemung River assigned to Broadway Middle School and Southside High School.
