= Pine Valley, Chemung County, New York =

Pine Valley, New York
- Census-designated place
- Location within New York Location within the United States
- Coordinates: 42°13′31″N 76°50′43″W
- Country: United States
- State: New York
- County: Chemung County
- Towns: Catlin, Veteran

Area
  - Total: 1.22 sq mi (3.15 km^{2})
  - Land: 1.20 sq mi (3.12 km^{2})
  - Water: 0.015 sq mi (0.04 km^{2})
- Elevation: 930 ft (280 m)

Population (2020)
  - Total: 832
  - Density: 690.9/sq mi (266.74/km^{2})
- Time zone: UTC-5 (Eastern (EST))
  - Summer (DST): UTC-4 (EDT)
- ZIP Codes: 14872 (Pine Valley); 14864 (Millport)
- Area code: 607
- FIPS code: 36-58189
- GNIS feature ID: 960559

Pine Valley is a hamlet and census-designated place in the towns of Catlin and Veteran in Chemung County, New York, United States. The population was 813 at the 2010 census.

== Geography ==
Pine Valley is located in northwestern Chemung County on the border of the towns of Catlin (to the west) and Veteran (to the east). It is on the west side of the valley of Catharine Creek, a northward-flowing tributary of Seneca Lake, one of the Finger Lakes. New York State Route 14 passes through the center of Pine Valley, leading south 4 miles (6 km) to Horseheads and 10 miles (16 km) to downtown Elmira. To the north Route 14 leads 9 miles (14 km) to Montour Falls and 12 miles (19 km) to Watkins Glen.

According to the United States Census Bureau, the Pine Valley CDP has a total area of 1.22 square miles (3.15 km^{2}), of which 1.20 square miles (3.12 km^{2}) is land and 0.02 square miles (0.04 km^{2}), or 1.12%, is water.

== Demographics ==
Historical population
Census	Pop.	Note	%±
2020	832		—
U.S. Decennial Census

== Education ==
The school district is Horseheads Central School District.
