= Erin (CDP), New York =

Erin, New York
- Census-designated place
- Location within the state of New York
- Coordinates: 42°11′09″N 76°40′11″W
- Country: United States
- State: New York
- County: Chemung County
- Town: Erin

Area
  - Total: 0.76 sq mi (1.96 km^{2})
  - Land: 0.75 sq mi (1.94 km^{2})
  - Water: 0.0077 sq mi (0.02 km^{2})
- Elevation: 1,265 ft (386 m)

Population (2020)
  - Total: 367
  - Density: 491.0/sq mi (189.59/km^{2})
- Time zone: UTC-5 (Eastern (EST))
  - Summer (DST): UTC-4 (EDT)
- ZIP code: 14838
- Area code: 607
- FIPS code: 36-24625
- GNIS feature ID: 944682

Erin is a hamlet and census-designated place (CDP) in the town of town of Erin, Chemung County, United States. The population of the CDP was 483 at the 2010 census, out of a total town population of 1,962.

== Geography ==
Erin is located in northeastern Chemung County, at the center of the town of Erin. It lies in the valley of Newtown Creek, a west- and then south-flowing tributary of the Chemung River, itself a tributary of the Susquehanna River. New York State Route 223 passes through the center of Erin, leading west 3.5 miles (5.6 km) to Breesport and 7 miles (11 km) to NY-13 near the village of Horseheads. Route 223 leads northeast 5.7 miles (9.2 km) to NY-224 in the valley of Cayuta Creek, which then leads 2.5 miles (4.0 km) farther east to Van Etten.

According to the United States Census Bureau, Erin has a total area of 0.76 square miles (1.96 km^{2}), of which 0.75 square miles (1.94 km^{2}) is land and 0.008 square miles (0.02 km^{2}), or 1.26%, is water.

== Demographics ==
Historical population
Census	Pop.	Note	%±
2020	367		—
U.S. Decennial Census

== Education ==
The school district is Horseheads Central School District.
