= West Elmira, New York =

- Census-designated place
- Location within New York Location within the United States
- Coordinates: 42°4′59″N 76°50′39″W
- Country: United States
- State: New York
- County: Chemung
- Town: Elmira

Area
  - Total: 3.15 sq mi (8.17 km^{2})
  - Land: 3.04 sq mi (7.87 km^{2})
  - Water: 0.12 sq mi (0.30 km^{2})
- Elevation: 890 ft (270 m)

Population (2020)
  - Total: 4,850
  - Density: 1,596.3/sq mi (616.34/km^{2})
- Time zone: UTC-5 (Eastern (EST))
  - Summer (DST): UTC-4 (EDT)
- ZIP Codes: 14905 (Elmira); 14903 (Elmira Heights)
- FIPS code: 36-79785
- GNIS feature ID: 0969213

West Elmira is a suburban census-designated place (CDP) in Chemung County, New York, United States. As of the 2020 census, West Elmira had a population of 4,850. It is adjacent to the city of Elmira on its west side. West Elmira is in the southwest part of the town of Elmira. It is part of the Elmira Metropolitan Statistical Area.

== Geography ==
West Elmira is located at 42°4′59″N 76°50′39″W (42.082974, -76.844046).

According to the United States Census Bureau, the CDP has a total area of 3.2 square miles (8.2 km^{2}), of which 3.1 square miles (7.9 km^{2}) is land and 0.12 square miles (0.3 km^{2}), or 3.69%, is water.

West Elmira is on the north bank of the Chemung River.

New York State Route 352 enters the village from the west as Water Street. East of York Avenue, Water Street carries eastbound traffic while Church Street carries westbound traffic.

== Demographics ==
Historical population
Census	Pop.	Note	%±
2020	4,850		—
U.S. Decennial Census

=== 2020 census ===
As of the 2020 census, West Elmira had a population of 4,850. The median age was 46.9 years. 20.2% of residents were under the age of 18 and 24.3% of residents were 65 years of age or older. For every 100 females there were 88.7 males, and for every 100 females age 18 and over there were 87.6 males age 18 and over.

96.3% of residents lived in urban areas, while 3.7% lived in rural areas.

There were 2,127 households in West Elmira, of which 24.5% had children under the age of 18 living in them. Of all households, 53.6% were married-couple households, 13.8% were households with a male householder and no spouse or partner present, and 26.6% were households with a female householder and no spouse or partner present. About 30.1% of all households were made up of individuals and 15.6% had someone living alone who was 65 years of age or older.

There were 2,273 housing units, of which 6.4% were vacant. The homeowner vacancy rate was 2.2% and the rental vacancy rate was 7.9%.

Racial composition as of the 2020 census
Race	Number	Percent
White	4,309	88.8%
Black or African American	151	3.1%
American Indian and Alaska Native	2	0.0%
Asian	64	1.3%
Native Hawaiian and Other Pacific Islander	2	0.0%
Some other race	35	0.7%
Two or more races	287	5.9%
Hispanic or Latino (of any race)	106	2.2%

=== 2000 census ===
As of the 2000 census, there were 5,136 people, 2,161 households, and 1,504 families residing in the community. The population density was 1,705.3 inhabitants per square mile (658.4/km^{2}). There were 2,266 housing units at an average density of 752.4 per square mile (290.5/km^{2}). The racial makeup of the CDP was 95.91% White, 1.83% African American, 0.08% Native American, 1.44% Asian, 0.18% from other races, and 0.56% from two or more races. Hispanic or Latino of any race were 0.51% of the population.

There were 2,161 households, out of which 29.2% had children under the age of 18 living with them, 59.5% were married couples living together, 7.7% had a female householder with no husband present, and 30.4% were non-families. 27.3% of all households were made up of individuals, and 15.9% had someone living alone who was 65 years of age or older. The average household size was 2.37 and the average family size was 2.87.

In the area the population was spread out, with 23.2% under the age of 18, 5.0% from 18 to 24, 23.4% from 25 to 44, 27.9% from 45 to 64, and 20.7% who were 65 years of age or older. The median age was 44 years. For every 100 females, there were 87.8 males. For every 100 females age 18 and over, there were 82.8 males.

The median income for a household in the area was $53,577, and the median income for a family was $66,705. Males had a median income of $40,746 versus $33,929 for females. The per capita income for the CDP was $28,376. About 3.6% of families and 5.7% of the population were below the poverty line, including 9.6% of those under age 18 and 0.6% of those age 65 or over.

== Education ==
Most of West Elmira is in the Elmira City School District. A portion is in the Elmira Heights Central School District.

As of 2004 the zoned elementary school of the section in the Elmira City District is Hendy Avenue School. The zoned middle and high schools for the entire school district are Broadway Academy (grade 7), Ernie Davis Academy (grades 8-9), and Elmira High School (grades 10-12). Prior to 2014, the school district had two sets of middle and high schools, with students north of the Chemung River assigned to Ernie Davis Middle School and Elmira Free Academy.
