= Elmira City School District =

School district in New York, United States

Location
- Elmira, New York

District information
- Type: Public
- Motto: Every student succeeds
- Grades: Pre-kindergarten, K-12
- Superintendent: Hillary J. Austin
- Accreditation: New York State Board of Regents
- Schools: 11
- Budget: ▼US$117.5 million (2010–2011)

Students and staff
- Students: 6850 (2008–2009)
- Teachers: 518 (2012-–2013)
- Staff: 345 (2008–2009)

Other information
- Unions: NYSUT
- Website: www.elmiracityschools.com

Elmira City School District is a school district headquartered in Elmira, New York. The district serves the city of Elmira and other communities.

The district is mostly in Chemung County. In addition to Elmira City, the district also includes the Village of Wellsburg, the Southport census-designated place, and a portion of the West Elmira CDP. It also includes the hamlet of Lowman. Towns in Chemung County which the district covers sections of include Ashland, Baldwin, Chemung, Erin, Horseheads, and Southport. Portions extend into Steuben County, where the district includes parts of Caton Town.

== Schools ==
Elementary schools:

- Fassett Elementary School
- Thomas Beecher Elementary School
- Hendy Elementary School
- Pine City Elementary School
- Diven Elementary School
- Riverside Elementary School
- Broadway Elementary School
- Coburn Elementary School

Secondary schools:

- Ernie Davis Academy (grades 7-8)
- Broadway Academy (grade 9)
- Elmira High School (grades 10-12)

Former schools

- Elmira Free Academy - Building changed to Ernie Davis Academy in 2014.
- Southside High School - Building changed to Elmira High School in 2014.
- Ernie Davis Middle School - Closed in 2014.
- Broadway Middle School- Changed to Broadway Academy in 2014.
