= Scotchtown Cemetery =

Historic cemetery in New York, United States

- U.S. National Register of Historic Places
- Location within New York Location within the United States
- Location: NY St. Rt. 223, Erin, New York
- Coordinates: 42°10′36.36″N 76°41′55.16″W
- Area: 2.5 acres (1.0 ha)
- Built: 1880
- NRHP reference No.: 08001229
- Added to NRHP: December 23, 2008

Scotchtown Cemetery is a historic vernacular rural cemetery located near Erin in Chemung County, New York. The cemetery includes a variety of monuments dating from the cemetery's founding in about 1880 to the present, with the majority before about 1950. Prior to 1880, the land was a burial ground for the local Presbyterian church.

It was listed on the National Register of Historic Places in 2009.
