= Elmira Heights Central School District =

School district in New York, United States

Location
- Elmira Heights, New York Southern Tier United States

District information
- Type: Public
- Grades: Pre-kindergarten, K-12
- Established: 1953
- Superintendent: Michael Gill
- Accreditation: Middle States Association of Colleges and Schools New York State Board of Regents
- Schools: 3
- Budget: $19,391,774 (2012–2013)
- NCES District ID: 3610590

Students and staff
- Students: 1,001 (2011–2012)
- Teachers: 85 (2011–2012)
- District mascot: Spartans

Other information
- Website: www.heightsschools.com

Elmira Heights Central School District is a school district in Elmira Heights, New York.

The district, in Chemung County, includes Elmira Heights and a portion of the West Elmira census-designated place, along with a small piece of the Big Flats CDP. The following towns have portions covered by this school district: Big Flats, Elmira, and Horseheads.

== Schools ==
- Cohen Elementary School
- Cohen Middle School
- Thomas Edison High School

Nail Files television star Katie Cazorla attended elementary school in Elmira Heights, although she graduated from nearby Horseheads High School.

== Athletics ==
- Baseball
- Basketball
- Bowling
- Cheerleading
- Cross Country
- Football
- Golf
- Softball
- Tennis
- Track and Field
- Volleyball
- Wrestling

== See also ==
List of school districts in New York
