= Joe Gilbert (American football) =

American football coach and former player (born 1965)

Carolina Panthers
- Title: Offensive line coach

Personal information
- Born: January 22, 1965 (age 61); Horseheads, New York, U.S.

Career information
- Position: Offensive lineman
- High school: Horseheads
- College: Hamilton

Career history
- Albany (1987–1988) Graduate assistant; Penn (1989–1990) Assistant Offensive line coach & recruiting coordinator; Northeastern (1991–1993) Offensive line coach & recruiting coordinator; Maine (1994–1995) Offensive line coach; Maine (1996–1999) Offensive coordinator & Offensive line coach; Mansfield (2000) Head coach; Toledo (2001–2003) Offensive line coach; UCF (2004–2006) Offensive line coach; Toledo (2007) Tight ends coach; Houston (2008) Offensive line coach; Illinois (2009) Offensive line coach; Illinois (2010–2011) Offensive line coach & assistant head coach; Indianapolis Colts (2012) Assistant offensive line coach; Indianapolis Colts (2013–2015) Offensive line coach; Indianapolis Colts (2016–2017) Assistant offensive line coach; Arizona (2018) Offensive line coach & run game coordinator; Tampa Bay Buccaneers (2019–2023) Offensive line coach; Carolina Panthers (2024–present) Offensive line coach

Awards and highlights
- Super Bowl champion (LV)

Joseph J. Gilbert (born January 22, 1965) is an American football coach who is the offensive line coach for the Carolina Panthers of the National Football League (NFL).

== Playing career ==
Gilbert was a standout athlete at Horseheads High School where he earned All-Twin-Tier honors before attending Hamilton College in Clinton, New York. Gilbert was a three-time all-conference selection, and four-year starter on the offensive line. During senior season, became the first Hamilton player to earn First Team All-America honors.

== Coaching career ==
=== Albany ===
Gilbert began his career in coaching at the University at Albany. He worked l as a graduate assistant in 1987 and 1988 under Bob Ford.

=== Penn ===
After Albany, Gilbert became the assistant offensive line and recruiting coordinator at the University of Pennsylvania for 1989 and 1990 under head coach Gary Steele.

=== Northeastern ===
In 1991, Barry Gallup and the Huskies hired Gilbert as their offensive line coach and recruiting coordinator. He remained with the team for three seasons.

=== Maine ===
After coaching at Northeastern, Gilbert was hired by Maine as the team's offensive line coach in 1994. After the 1995 season, he was given the additional title of offensive coordinator, in addition to his duties with the offensive line.

=== Mansfield ===
In 2000, Gilbert had his first opportunity as a head coach at Mansfield. He only remained with the team for one season.

=== Toledo ===
In 2001, Gilbert returned to coaching the offensive line this time at Toledo under coach Tom Amstutz. Gilbert left the team after the 2003 season.

=== UCF ===
On February 6,2004 following his three-year run in Toledo, went to UCF. There he went on to coach the offensive line also for three years.

=== Return to Toledo ===
In 2007, Gilbert returned to Toledo as the team's tight ends coach. However he only remained there for a single season.

=== Houston ===
Gilbert spent the 2008 season at the University of Houston, where he led an offensive line that helped the team rank second in the nation in passing and total offense and 10th in scoring offense.

=== Illinois ===
In 2009, Gilbert was hired by Ron Zook as the Illini's offensive line coach. In 2010, he added the title of assistant head coach.

=== Colts ===
He had a six-year stint with the Indianapolis Colts. First named an assistant offensive line coach in 2012, he held the title of offensive line coach from 2013 to 2015, and reverted to the assistant line coach in 2016 and 2017.

=== Arizona ===
Gilbert coached the offensive line at the University of Arizona in 2018, while also having the title of run game coordinator.

=== Buccaneers ===
In 2019 Gilbert returned to the NFL becoming the Bucs offensive line coach. Gilbert earned his first Super Bowl title when the Buccaneers won Super Bowl LV.

=== Panthers ===
In 2024, he followed Dave Canales to the Carolina Panthers and became the team’s offensive line coach.

== Personal life ==
Joe and his wife, Cheryl, have one daughter, Madison, and three sons, Nicholas, Joseph and Timothy.
