= Catharine, New York =

- Town
- Location within the state of New York
- Coordinates: 42°19′45″N 76°45′21″W
- Country: United States
- State: New York
- County: Schuyler

Area
  - Total: 32.90 sq mi (85.21 km^{2})
  - Land: 32.29 sq mi (83.64 km^{2})
  - Water: 0.61 sq mi (1.57 km^{2})
- Elevation: 1,594 ft (486 m)

Population (2020)
  - Total: 1,656 ▼
  - Estimate (2021): 1,634
  - Density: 52.6/sq mi (20.29/km^{2})
- Time zone: UTC-5 (Eastern (EST))
  - Summer (DST): UTC-4 (EDT)
- FIPS code: 36-12914
- GNIS feature ID: 0978799

Catharine is a town in Schuyler County, New York, United States. The population was 1,656 at the 2020 census. The town is one of two in the county named after Catherine Montour, a Native American interpreter and leader in the area. The Town of Catharine is in the southeastern part of the county and is north of Elmira.

== History ==
A Seneca village informally known as Catharine's Town was located near the falls. It was destroyed by colonial forces during the Sullivan Expedition of 1779, one of more than 40 villages destroyed across western New York in retaliation for raids in the eastern part of the province.

The first European-American settlers are thought to have arrived around 1788 after the American Revolutionary War. The Seneca and other Iroquois allies of the British were forced to cede their lands in New York. The Town of Catharine was created by the New York State Legislature in 1798, with its first elections occurring in the same year. By 1805 the town had grown sufficiently that a Methodist congregation was formed in the eponymous hamlet of Catharine. An Episcopalian congregation was the first to build a church, St. John's, in 1811.

The town was originally organized as part of Chemung County, before the formation of Schuyler County. Property for Catharine was taken from the Town of Elmira (then called "Newtown") in 1798. Part of Catharine was in turn divided to form the Towns of Veteran and Catlin (both in Chemung County) in 1825. Catharine was further reduced by the formation of the Town of Montour in 1857. When Schuyler County was established in 1854, Catharine was removed from the remit of Chemung County.

The Lattin-Crandall Octagon Barn was listed on the National Register of Historic Places in 1984.

== Geography ==
According to the United States Census Bureau, the town has a total area of 32.9 square miles (85 km^{2}), of which 32.3 square miles (84 km^{2}) is land and 0.6 square miles (1.6 km^{2}) (1.82%) is water.

The south town line is the border of Chemung County. New York State Route 224 crosses the town and joins New York State Route 228 in Odessa.

== Demographics ==
Historical population
Census	Pop.	Note	%±
1820	2,478		—
1830	2,064		−16.7%
1840	2,424		17.4%
1850	3,096		27.7%
1860	3,688		19.1%
1870	1,629		−55.8%
1880	1,617		−0.7%
1890	1,398		−13.5%
1900	1,386		−0.9%
1910	1,222		−11.8%
1920	1,178		−3.6%
1930	1,177		−0.1%
1940	1,284		9.1%
1950	1,399		9.0%
1960	1,605		14.7%
1970	1,886		17.5%
1980	1,932		2.4%
1990	1,991		3.1%
2000	1,930		−3.1%
2010	1,762		−8.7%
2020	1,656		−6.0%
2021 (est.)	1,634		−1.3%
U.S. Decennial Census

As of the census of 2000, there were 1,930 people, 755 households, and 526 families residing in the town. The population density was 59.7 inhabitants per square mile (23.1/km^{2}). There were 865 housing units at an average density of 26.8 per square mile (10.3/km^{2}). The racial makeup of the town was 96.79% White, 0.57% African American, 0.52% Native American, 0.16% Asian, 0.05% Pacific Islander, 0.62% from other races, and 1.30% from two or more races. Hispanic or Latino of any race were 0.98% of the population.

There were 755 households, out of which 33.9% had children under the age of 18 living with them, 53.0% were married couples living together, 12.1% had a female householder with no husband present, and 30.2% were non-families. 23.8% of all households were made up of individuals, and 9.4% had someone living alone who was 65 years of age or older. The average household size was 2.54 and the average family size was 3.00.

In the town, the population was spread out, with 26.7% under the age of 18, 7.7% from 18 to 24, 27.7% from 25 to 44, 26.0% from 45 to 64, and 12.0% who were 65 years of age or older. The median age was 37 years. For every 100 females, there were 98.8 males. For every 100 females age 18 and over, there were 97.1 males.

The median income for a household in the town was $36,207, and the median income for a family was $41,979. Males had a median income of $29,191 versus $24,327 for females. The per capita income for the town was $16,496. About 10.4% of families and 11.6% of the population were below the poverty line, including 18.9% of those under age 18 and 6.4% of those age 65 or over.

== Notable people ==
- Alexander S. Diven, former US Army Office and Congressman
- William Terry Jackson, former US Congressman

== Communities and locations in the Town of Catharine ==
- Alpine – A hamlet in the southeast part of the town on NY-224 and Cayuta Creek.
- Catharine – The hamlet of Catharine in the western part of the town on County Road 15, south of Odessa. It was once called "Johnsons Settlement."
- Cayuta Creek – the outlet of Cayuta Lake, flowing from its south end.
- Cayuta Inlet – a stream entering Cayuta Lake through a marsh at the north end.
- Cayuta Lake – A small lake in the northeast part of the town, east of NY-228.
- Odessa – The Village of Odessa is in the west part of the town on NY-224.
