= Elmira Heights Village Hall =

- U.S. National Register of Historic Places
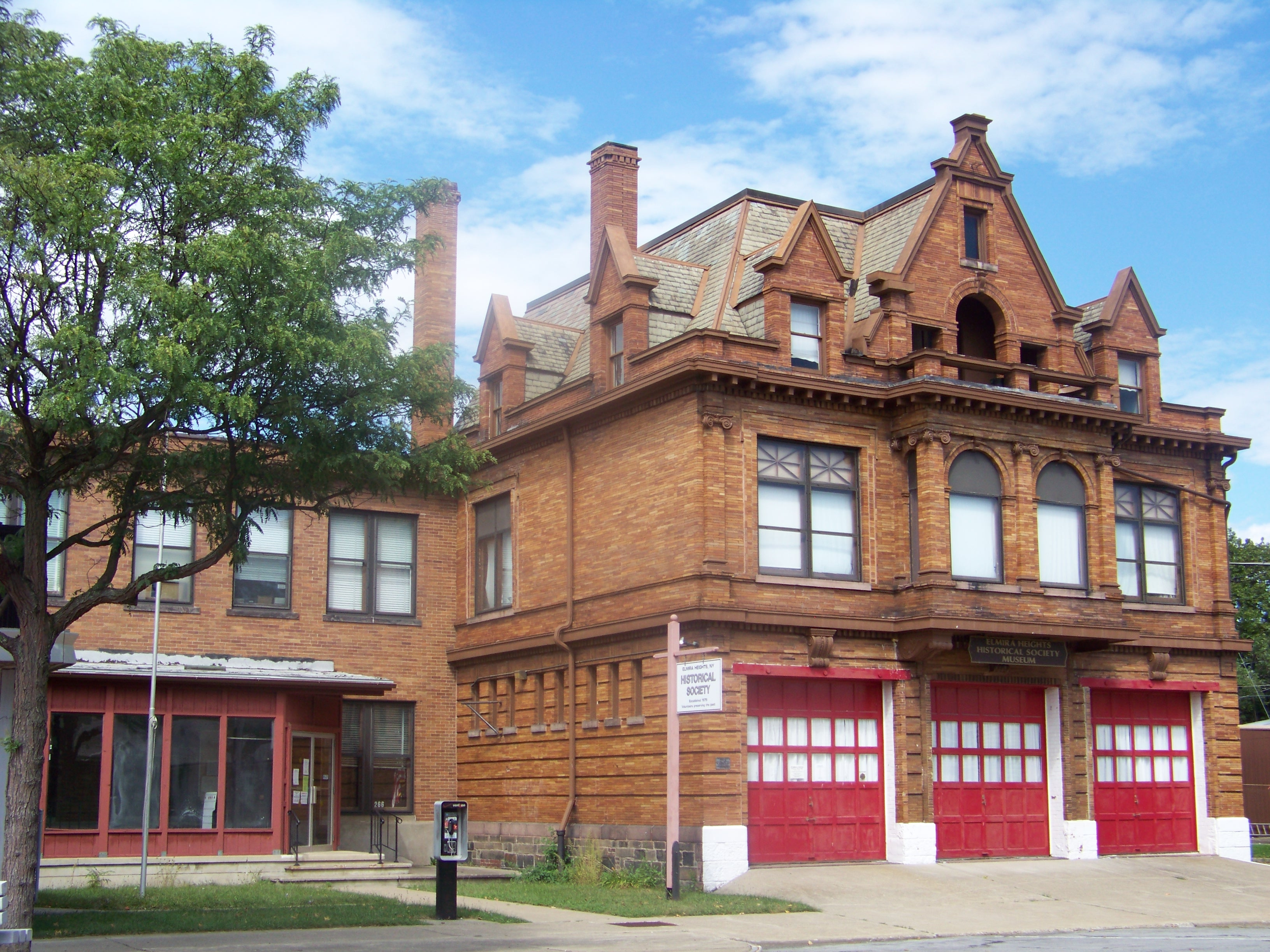
- Elmira Heights Village Hall, September 2008

- Location within New York Location within the United States
- Location: 268 E. 14th St., Elmira Heights, New York
- Coordinates: 42°7′46″N 76°49′18″W
- Area: 0.2 acres (0.081 ha)
- Built: 1896
- Architect: Pierce & Bickford
- Architectural style: Late 19th And 20th Century Revivals, Chateauesque
- NRHP reference No.: 82003349
- Added to NRHP: May 6, 1982

The Elmira Heights Village Hall, located in Elmira Heights, New York, was built in 1896. It was designed by local architects Pierce & Bickford. It is significant architecturally as an example of the Chateauesque or Northern Renaissance Revival style of the period. It is significant historically for its role in local government. The building was added to the National Register of Historic Places in 1982.
