= Veteran, New York =

- Town
- Location within New York Location within the United States
- Coordinates: 42°15′23″N 76°48′29″W
- Country: United States
- State: New York
- County: Chemung

Government
  - Type: Town Council
  - Town Supervisor: William Winkky
  - Town Council: Members' List: • Louis F. DeCicco; • Lance Blakemore; • David Lewis; • Francis G. Henke

Area
  - Total: 38.47 sq mi (99.64 km^{2})
  - Land: 38.33 sq mi (99.27 km^{2})
  - Water: 0.14 sq mi (0.37 km^{2})
- Elevation: 1,306 ft (398 m)

Population (2020)
  - Total: 3,363 ▲
  - Estimate (2021): 3,302
  - Density: 84.0/sq mi (32.43/km^{2})
- Time zone: UTC-5 (Eastern (EST))
  - Summer (DST): UTC-4 (EDT)
- ZIP Codes: 14845 (Horseheads); 14864 (Millport); 14872 (Pine Valley); 14805 (Alpine); 14816 (Breesport); 14824 (Cayuta)
- FIPS code: 36-015-77310
- GNIS feature ID: 0979583
- Website: townofveteranny.gov

Veteran is a town in Chemung County, New York, United States. The population was 3,363 at the 2020 census. The name of the town honors the first settler, a veteran of two wars.

The town is on the county's northern border and is north of Elmira. Veteran is part of the Elmira Metropolitan Statistical Area.

== History ==
The Sullivan Expedition of 1779 passed through this area.

The first settler was Green Bentley, a veteran of both the American Revolution and the French and Indian War, who arrived circa 1798. The town of Veteran was formed in 1823 from the town of Catharine, which became part of Schuyler County.

The former Chemung Canal passed through the town.

== Geography ==
According to the United States Census Bureau, the town has a total area of 38.5 square miles (99.6 km^{2}), of which 38.3 square miles (99.3 km^{2}) is land and 0.15 square miles (0.4 km^{2}), or 0.37%, is water.

The northern town line is the border of Schuyler County.

== Demographics ==
Historical population
Census	Pop.	Note	%±
1830	1,616		—
1840	2,279		41.0%
1850	2,698		18.4%
1860	2,171		−19.5%
1870	2,479		14.2%
1880	2,263		−8.7%
1890	1,816		−19.8%
1900	1,652		−9.0%
1910	1,470		−11.0%
1920	1,471		0.1%
1930	1,515		3.0%
1940	1,582		4.4%
1950	1,856		17.3%
1960	2,729		47.0%
1970	3,543		29.8%
1980	3,651		3.0%
1990	3,468		−5.0%
2000	3,271		−5.7%
2010	3,313		1.3%
2020	3,363		1.5%
2021 (est.)	3,302		−1.8%
U.S. Decennial Census

As of the census of 2000, there were 3,271 people, 1,261 households, and 948 families residing in the town. The population density was 85.1 inhabitants per square mile (32.9/km^{2}). There were 1,331 housing units at an average density of 34.6 per square mile (13.4/km^{2}). The racial makeup of the town was 97.98% White, 0.43% African American, 0.15% Native American, 0.24% Asian, 0.24% from other races, and 0.95% from two or more races. Hispanic or Latino of any race were 0.86% of the population.

There were 1,261 households, out of which 32.0% had children under the age of 18 living with them, 63.0% were married couples living together, 8.0% had a female householder with no husband present, and 24.8% were non-families. 20.2% of all households were made up of individuals, and 8.6% had someone living alone who was 65 years of age or older. The average household size was 2.58 and the average family size was 2.96.

In the town, the population was spread out, with 25.0% under the age of 18, 5.7% from 18 to 24, 27.1% from 25 to 44, 27.9% from 45 to 64, and 14.2% who were 65 years of age or older. The median age was 41 years. For every 100 females, there were 98.0 males. For every 100 females age 18 and over, there were 96.2 males.

The median income for a household in the town was $44,521, and the median income for a family was $50,972. Males had a median income of $31,490 versus $26,027 for females. The per capita income for the town was $20,522. About 6.8% of families and 10.6% of the population were below the poverty line, including 15.9% of those under age 18 and 2.6% of those age 65 or over.

== Communities and locations in the town of Veteran ==
- Midway – A hamlet south of Millport on Route 14 and next to Catherine Creek.
- Millport – The village of Millport is in the northwestern part of the town on Catherine Creek and Route 14. It was once called "Millvale".
- Pine Valley – A hamlet and census-designated place on the western town line in the southwestern corner of the town. It extends west into the town of Catlin.
- Rush Run – A hamlet in the eastern part of the town on Route 13.
- Slabtown – Part of the hamlet of Slabtown is within the southern town line.
- Sullivanville – A hamlet northeast of Slabtown in the southern part of the town on Route 13. It was formerly called "Deans Corners".
