= Cayuta Lake =

Lake in Schuyler County, New York, US

- Location within New York
- Location: Schuyler County, New York
- Coordinates: 42°22′04″N 076°44′05″W
- Primary inflows: Cayuta Lake Inlet
- Primary outflows: Cayuta Creek
- Basin countries: United States
- Max. length: 2 mi (3.2 km)
- Surface area: 380 acres (150 ha)
- Average depth: 14 ft (4.3 m)
- Max. depth: 26 ft (7.9 m)
- Surface elevation: 1,316 ft (401 m)
- Settlements: Catharine

Cayuta Lake is a small lake located in Schuyler County, New York, United States. It is within the Town of Catharine, about three miles (4.8 km) north of Odessa. The lake is also referred to locally as Little Lake.

== Name origin ==
The name "Cayuta" is of Native American origin, and is shared with a nearby stream, town, and hamlet. The name may have been derived from the word geihate ("a river"), or it may be a corrupted form of kanyatiye ("a lake"). Additional possibilities for the name's origin include keunton ("prickly ash") or an abbreviated form of kayahtane ("mosquito"). The lake was also known to Native Americans as Ganiatarenge ("at the lake").

By legend the lake is named after a Seneca princess, who was kidnapped by another tribe, causing her mother's tears to form the lake. An older spelling, still sometimes used, is "Kayutah".

== Description ==
Cayuta Lake is an approximately two-mile-long (3.2 km) lake with a surface area of about 380 acres (150 ha). It reaches a maximum depth of 26 feet (7.9 m) and has an average depth of 14 feet (4.3 m).

The lake is linked to the Susquehanna River by Cayuta Creek, which flows out the south end of the lake. A major feeder stream for Cayuta Lake is Cayuta Lake Inlet, which enters the lake through a marsh area on the north end. Much of this northern shore of the lake is within the Allen Preserve.

Cayuta Lake contains a heavy growth of submerged aquatic vegetation along most all shoreline areas, but especially in the shallow water near the south end of the lake. Fish species include walleye, chain pickerel, largemouth bass, yellow perch, bluegill, pumpkinseed, black crappie, rock bass, brown bullhead, chubsucker, golden shiner, white sucker, common carp.

== Fishing ==
Cayuta Lake provides warmwater fishing opportunities. Largemouth bass and chain pickerel are the primary predators found in the lake. A recent angler survey revealed largemouth bass five pounds (2.3 kg) and larger are occasionally caught. In addition to bass and pickerel, walleye populations provide added diversity to angler catches. Bluegills, yellow perch, and black crappie are plentiful and dominate the panfish catch. In addition to the open water fishery, ice fishing opportunities exist within Cayuta Lake with anglers targeting pickerel and panfish species.

In the past, a small, naturally occurring walleye population has periodically been supplemented with hatchery-reared fish resulting in a sizeable walleye fishery. However, an abundant alewife population has negatively impacted both walleye recruitment and angler success for walleye with only a few anglers catching an occasional large walleye. More recently, a research project looking at controlling alewife populations from a predator level resulted in the stocking of over 250,000 walleye fingerlings over a 5-year period ending in 2006. Although the desired results have not yet been achieved, these fish have reached the 18 inches (46 cm) minimum size limit and are quite abundant, but still difficult to catch.

=== Access ===
Much of the shoreline is private property, however a state-owned public boat launch is located on the north end of Cayuta Lake on Loch Heid Road off of Cayutaville Road. There is a concrete ramp, seasonal dock, and parking for 15 cars and trailers.
