= Elmira Heights, New York =

- Village
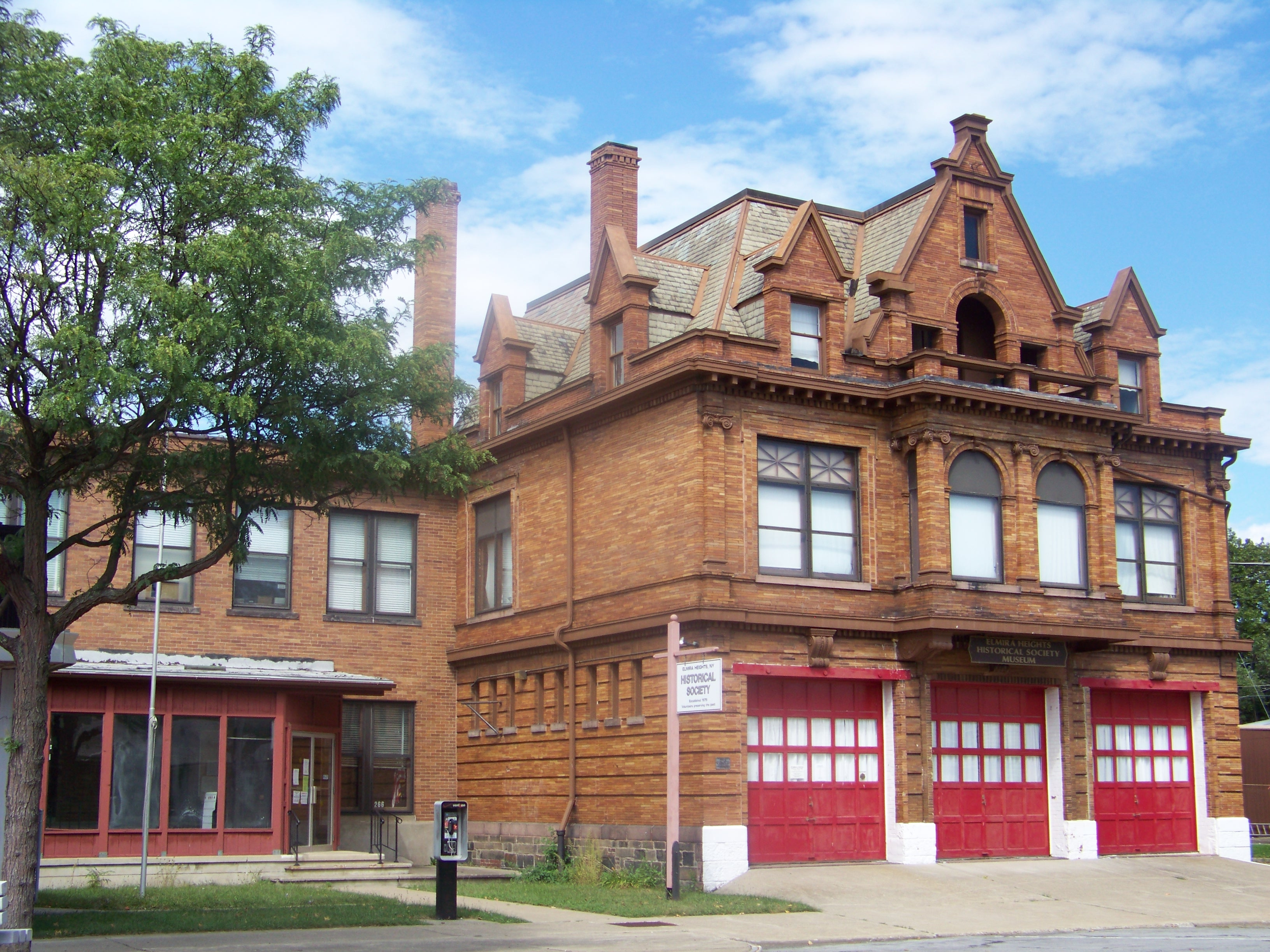
- Village Hall

- Location within the state of New York
- Coordinates: 42°7′38″N 76°49′27″W
- Country: United States
- State: New York
- County: Chemung
- Towns: Horseheads, Elmira

Government
  - Mayor: Margaret Smith (R)

Area
  - Total: 1.15 sq mi (2.97 km^{2})
  - Land: 1.15 sq mi (2.97 km^{2})
  - Water: 0 sq mi (0.00 km^{2})
- Elevation: 879 ft (268 m)

Population (2020)
  - Total: 3,916
  - Density: 3,415.9/sq mi (1,318.87/km^{2})
- Time zone: UTC-5 (Eastern (EST))
  - Summer (DST): UTC-4 (EDT)
- ZIP code: 14903
- Area code: 607
- FIPS code: 36-24251
- GNIS feature ID: 0949579
- Website: www.elmiraheightsvillage.com

Elmira Heights is a village in Chemung County, New York, United States. As of the 2020 census, Elmira Heights had a population of 3,916. The village is primarily within the town of Horseheads, but part of the village is in the town of Elmira. The village is a northern suburb of the city of Elmira. It is part of the Elmira, New York Metropolitan Statistical Area.

== History ==
The Elmira Heights Village Hall was listed on the National Register of Historic Places in 1982. The Lackawanna Railroad once had a stop at Elmira Heights, 250.8 miles from its terminal at Hoboken, NJ.

== Geography ==
Elmira Heights is located at 42°7′38″N 76°49′27″W (42.127298, -76.824214).

According to the United States Census Bureau, the village has a total area of 1.15 square miles (2.97 km^{2}), all land.

Newtown Creek, a tributary of the Chemung River, flows along the east side of the village, outside the village limits.

The Southern Tier Expressway (Interstate 86 and New York State Route 17) passes east of the village on the far side of the Newtown Creek valley. The closest expressway access is from Horseheads to the north or Elmira to the south. New York State Route 14 (College Avenue) and County Road 66 (Grand Central Avenue) are north–south streets through the village.

== Demographics ==
Historical population
Census	Pop.	Note	%±
1900	1,763		—
1910	2,732		55.0%
1920	4,188		53.3%
1930	5,061		20.8%
1940	4,829		−4.6%
1950	5,009		3.7%
1960	5,157		3.0%
1970	4,906		−4.9%
1980	4,279		−12.8%
1990	4,359		1.9%
2000	4,170		−4.3%
2010	4,097		−1.8%
2020	3,916		−4.4%
U.S. Decennial Census

=== 2020 census ===
As of the 2020 census, Elmira Heights had a population of 3,916. The median age was 40.0 years. 22.1% of residents were under the age of 18 and 16.9% of residents were 65 years of age or older. For every 100 females there were 91.7 males, and for every 100 females age 18 and over there were 89.9 males age 18 and over.

100.0% of residents lived in urban areas, while 0.0% lived in rural areas.

There were 1,862 households in Elmira Heights, of which 27.2% had children under the age of 18 living in them. Of all households, 31.8% were married-couple households, 22.3% were households with a male householder and no spouse or partner present, and 34.5% were households with a female householder and no spouse or partner present. About 39.9% of all households were made up of individuals and 16.5% had someone living alone who was 65 years of age or older.

There were 1,990 housing units, of which 6.4% were vacant. The homeowner vacancy rate was 0.9% and the rental vacancy rate was 3.8%.

Racial composition as of the 2020 census
Race	Number	Percent
White	3,418	87.3%
Black or African American	137	3.5%
American Indian and Alaska Native	10	0.3%
Asian	41	1.0%
Native Hawaiian and Other Pacific Islander	0	0.0%
Some other race	40	1.0%
Two or more races	270	6.9%
Hispanic or Latino (of any race)	112	2.9%

=== 2000 census ===
As of the census of 2000, there were 4,170 people, 1,874 households, and 1,053 families residing in the village. The population density was 3,664.5 inhabitants per square mile (1,414.9/km^{2}). There were 2,010 housing units at an average density of 1,766.3 per square mile (682.0/km^{2}). The racial makeup of the village was 97.03% White, 1.03% African American, 0.19% Native American, 0.50% Asian, 0.02% Pacific Islander, 0.19% from other races, and 1.03% from two or more races. Hispanic or Latino of any race were 0.79% of the population.

There were 1,874 households, out of which 29.0% had children under the age of 18 living with them, 39.0% were married couples living together, 12.6% had a female householder with no husband present, and 43.8% were non-families. 37.9% of all households were made up of individuals, and 18.4% had someone living alone who was 65 years of age or older. The average household size was 2.22 and the average family size was 2.96.

In the village, the population was spread out, with 24.6% under the age of 18, 7.9% from 18 to 24, 28.7% from 25 to 44, 20.5% from 45 to 64, and 18.3% who were 65 years of age or older. The median age was 38 years. For every 100 females, there were 87.8 males. For every 100 females age 18 and over, there were 82.5 males.

The median income for a household in the village was $29,015, and the median income for a family was $36,250. Males had a median income of $32,135 versus $21,788 for females. The per capita income for the village was $16,334. About 7.1% of families and 9.8% of the population were below the poverty line, including 11.4% of those under age 18 and 7.6% of those age 65 or over.

== Fire protection ==
=== Fire department history ===
The Elmira Heights Volunteer Fire Department was founded in 1896. When it began it was composed of two companies, the Chemical and Hose Company and the Independent Hook and Ladder Company. These later combined into one department. The first fire chief was William Monroe, and the first fire bell was purchased from Grace Church in Elmira. The original fire station was across the street from its present location on the northeast corner of Scottwood and Fourteenth Street. It was merely a shed in which to store equipment. Throughout the Heights three hose carts were placed. In case of a fire, this was the procedure used: Someone ran to ring the fire bell while everyone else near the fire ran to the hose cart to fasten the hose to the nearest hydrant. When the fire bell rang, firemen from every part of the village raced to the fire station. The hook and ladder truck was hand-drawn. The hose carts and chemical engine were horse-drawn.

Anyone with a team of horses made a bee-line for the station. The first team that appeared to pull the apparatus received three dollars for his services and the second team received two dollars for the use of his team. The race to see what man would get his team to the fire station first was almost as exciting as the fire itself. At the fire, the hose was connected to the hose already connect to the hydrant and the real fire fighting began.

The fire department had its social side as well. The two companies were as separate as it was possible to be. You either belonged to one or the other, but never both. You might walk to the door of the building with your friend of the other company, but once inside the door friendship ceased until you came back out. Benefit dances, card parties, and social gatherings were held and things went fine until it was time to divide the money. This rivalry and animosity continued until one night a new fire chief, tired of the bickering, ordered the door to be opened between the parlors of the two companies.

=== Fire department today ===
Today the Elmira Heights Fire Department is located next door to the Elmira Heights Village Hall. Although the roster remains all-volunteer, the Village funds a 24/365 "Paid First Responder" program. There is a qualified duty responder within the station at all times, ready to respond to alarms. The department continues to offer Fire, Rescue and EMS services to the village of Elmira Heights and the towns of Elmira and Horseheads.

=== Elmira Heights Fire Company #1 ===
The membership of the Elmira Heights Fire Department is made up of the Elmira Heights Fire Company. This is a private, not for profit social entity that supports the department from within the all-volunteer roster. They are housed within the department and operate as volunteer employees of the department during alarms. The department is responsible for day-to-day operations, apparatus maintenance, training & education, alarm response, etc. Whereas the company manages all fund raising efforts and social engagements. The Elmira Heights Fire Company solely funds the department EMS program.

=== Can and bottle drive ===
In 2011, the Elmira Heights Fire Company began a program encouraging the local public to donate their empty deposit cans and bottles. With the assistance of a local recycling company and a few dedicated members, the company has been able to collaborate with the village board to rehab their heavy rescue apparatus. They have since also donated two more apparatus to the village. One being a quick response EMS apparatus and also a wild land "brush" suppression vehicle. Due to an overwhelming response from the public, this program continues to fund EMS and other operations that may otherwise not continue without an additional tax levy on the residents.

=== Former fire apparatus manufacturer ===
Elmira Heights was once the location of the Ward LaFrance Truck Corporation's manufacturing facility.

== Police services ==
The Elmira Heights Police Department is a small full-service agency consisting of a force of eleven men which offers 24/7 police protection to the village of Elmira Heights. The department investigates all offenses that take place within the boundaries of the village. The Police Department shares their operations facility with the Elmira Heights Fire Department.

== Education ==
It is in the Elmira Heights Central School District.
