= Cayuta Creek =

River in the United States of America

Cayuta Creek Shepahards Creek, Shepards Creek, Shepherd Creek

Location
- Country: United States
- State: Pennsylvania

Physical characteristics
- Source: Cayuta Lake
  - location: Catharine, New York
  - coordinates: 42.3578514°N 76.7427297°W
- Mouth: Susquehanna River
  - location: Sayre, Pennsylvania
  - coordinates: 41.9834075°N 76.5066097°W
- Length: 35.2 mi (56.6 km)

Cayuta Creek (Kay-YOO-tuh) is a tributary of the Susquehanna River that flows through Schuyler, Chemung and Tioga counties in New York state, and Bradford County, Pennsylvania.

It is 35.2 miles (56.6 km) long, rising at Cayuta Lake, sometimes locally referred to as "Little Lake", near Alpine in the town of Catherine, in eastern Schuyler County.

The creek flows from the lake in a southeasterly direction, roughly parallel to New York State Route 224, past Alpine Junction and the hamlet of Cayuta. It then crosses into Chemung County and flows through the village of Van Etten.

At Van Etten, the creek turns southward and runs through the western edge of Tioga County. It flows through Lockwood and Reniff in the town of Barton, and through the eastern part of the village of Waverly, where it passes beneath the Southern Tier Expressway.

Immediately south of the highway, the creek crosses into Pennsylvania in the borough of Sayre. It then flows southeastward through the borough's Milltown section before emptying into the Susquehanna.

There is a 2.5-mile-long (4.0 km) hiking trail through the gorge near Alpine. The trail is particularly beautiful in summer and fall and is an easy hike with slight rises and falls, according to the Schuyler County Chamber of Commerce.

== See also ==
- List of New York rivers
- List of rivers of Pennsylvania
