= Crandall Houses =

Historic house in Utah, United States

- U.S. National Register of Historic Places
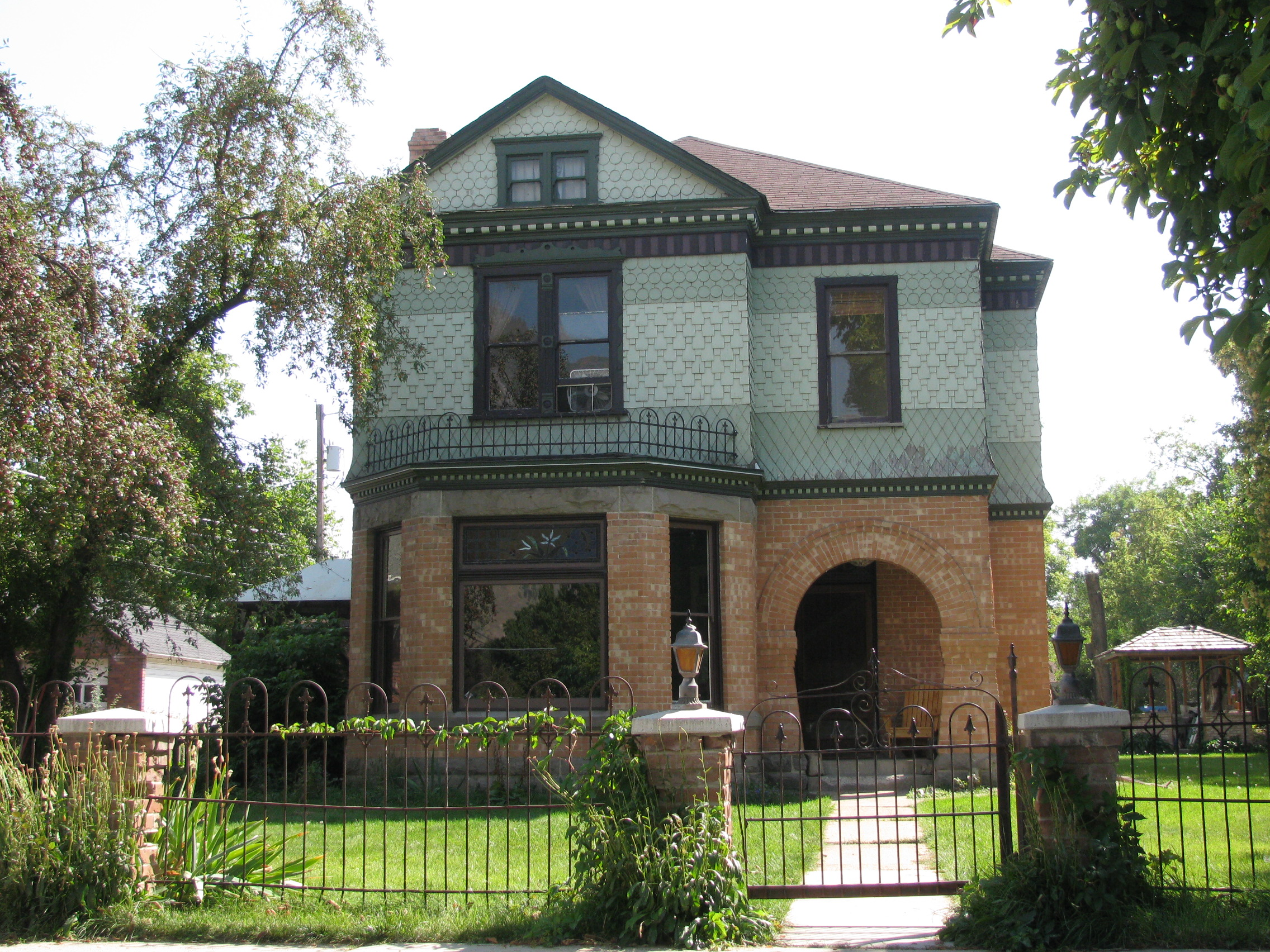
- 136 E. 200 North

- Location within Utah Location within the United States
- Location: 112 and 136 E. 200 North, Springville, Utah
- Coordinates: 40°10′9″N 111°36′28″W
- Area: less than one acre
- Built: 1900
- Architectural style: Late Victorian
- NRHP reference No.: 83003196
- Added to NRHP: January 19, 1983

The Crandall Houses at 112 and 136 E. 200 North in Springville, Utah are listed on the National Register of Historic Places. They are the Clarence L. Crandall House and the Nelson D. Crandall House. The houses were both built in 1900, and are twin houses that look virtually identical. The designs appear to be adapted from pattern books circulating around that time. The design of the houses reflects the Victorian ideal of adapting high-style architecture to vernacular style homes. The Queen Anne-style trim, in particular, is unique within Springville.
