= Louis A. Crandall House =

Historic house in Oregon, United States

- Lewis A. Crandall House
- U.S. National Register of Historic Places
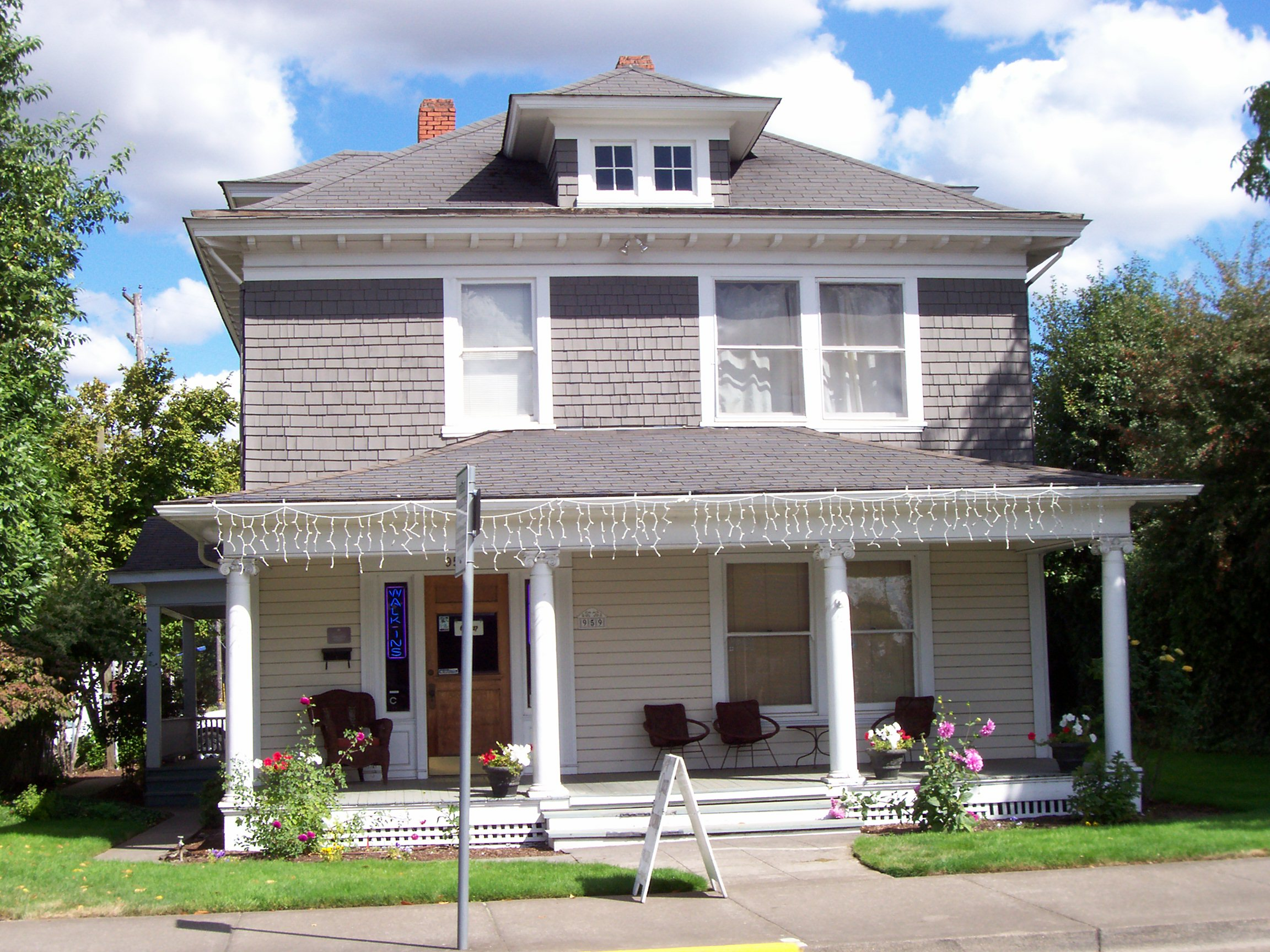

- Location within Oregon Location within the United States
- Location: 959 Main St., Lebanon, Oregon
- Coordinates: 44°32′13″N 122°54′20″W
- Area: less than one acre
- Built: c.1906
- Built by: Crandall, Lewis, Albert I. et al.
- Architect: Crandall, Albert I.
- Architectural style: Colonial Revival, Bungalow/Craftsman
- NRHP reference No.: 90001588
- Added to NRHP: October 25, 1990

The Louis A. Crandall House at 959 Main St. in Lebanon, Oregon was built in about 1906. It was listed on the National Register of Historic Places in 1980.

It is a 2 1/2-story house that is the "only example of high style American Foursquare architecture in Lebanon". It was designed by Albert I. Crandall. It was built by the Crandall Brothers Planing Mill, a company including brothers Louis, Albert, and Ira Crandall.
