= Lattin-Crandall Octagon Barn =

- U.S. National Register of Historic Places
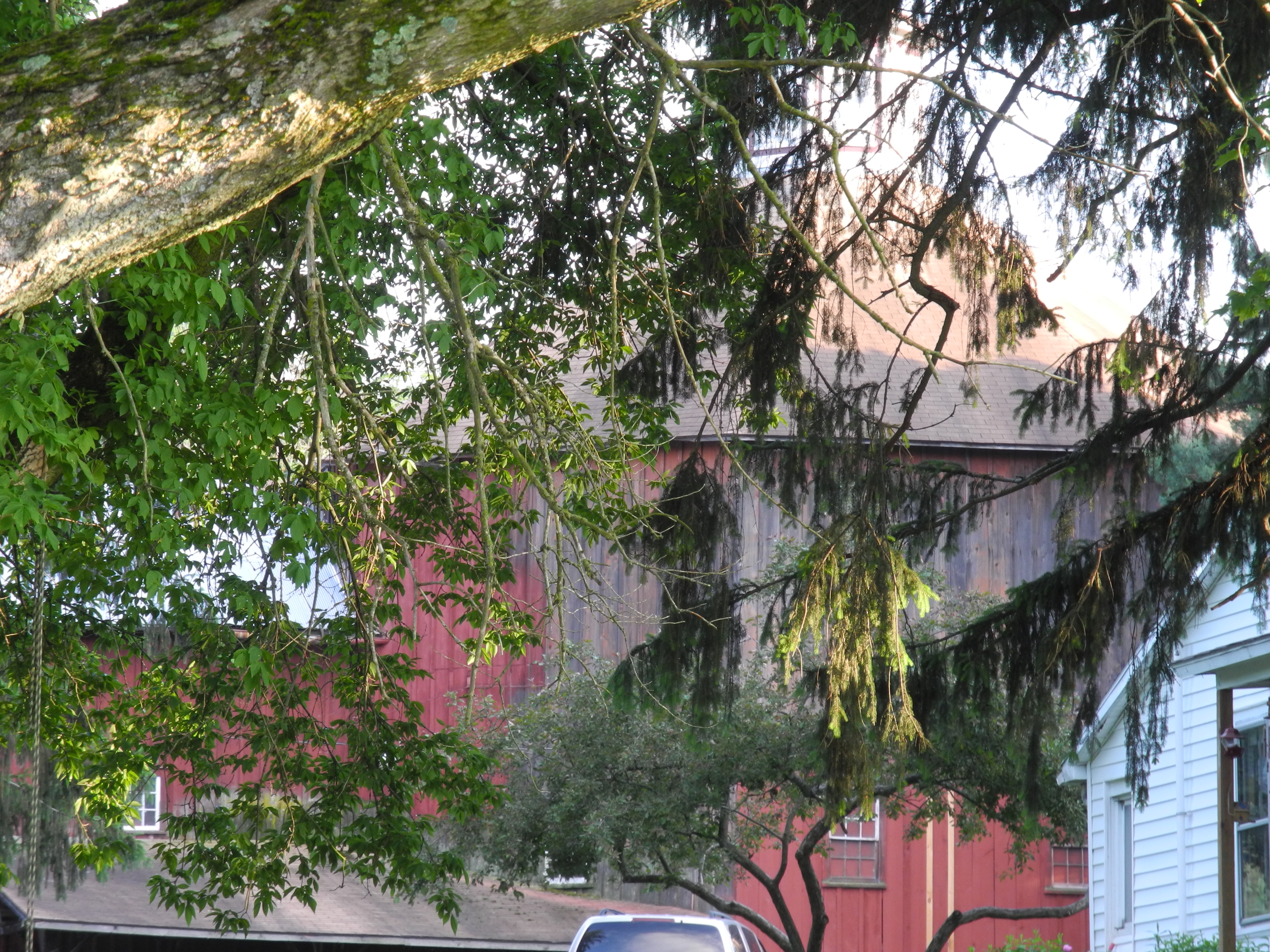
- Lattin-Crandall Octagon Barn, June 2013

- Location within New York Location within the United States
- Location: E of Catherine, near Catharine, New York
- Coordinates: 42°18′43″N 76°46′4″W
- Area: less than one acre
- Built: 1893
- Architect: Stewart, George
- Architectural style: Octagon Mode
- MPS: Central Plan Dairy Barns of New York TR
- NRHP reference No.: 84002970
- Added to NRHP: September 29, 1984

Lattin-Crandall Octagon Barn is a historic octagonal barn located near Catharine in Schuyler County, New York. It was built in 1893 and is significant as an early example in New York State of the octagon prototype popularized by Elliot Stewart in the 1870s. It is a frame structure with cupola that features a self-supporting roof without intervening members.

It was listed on the National Register of Historic Places in 1984.
