= Elmira (town), New York =

Town of Elmira, New York
- Town
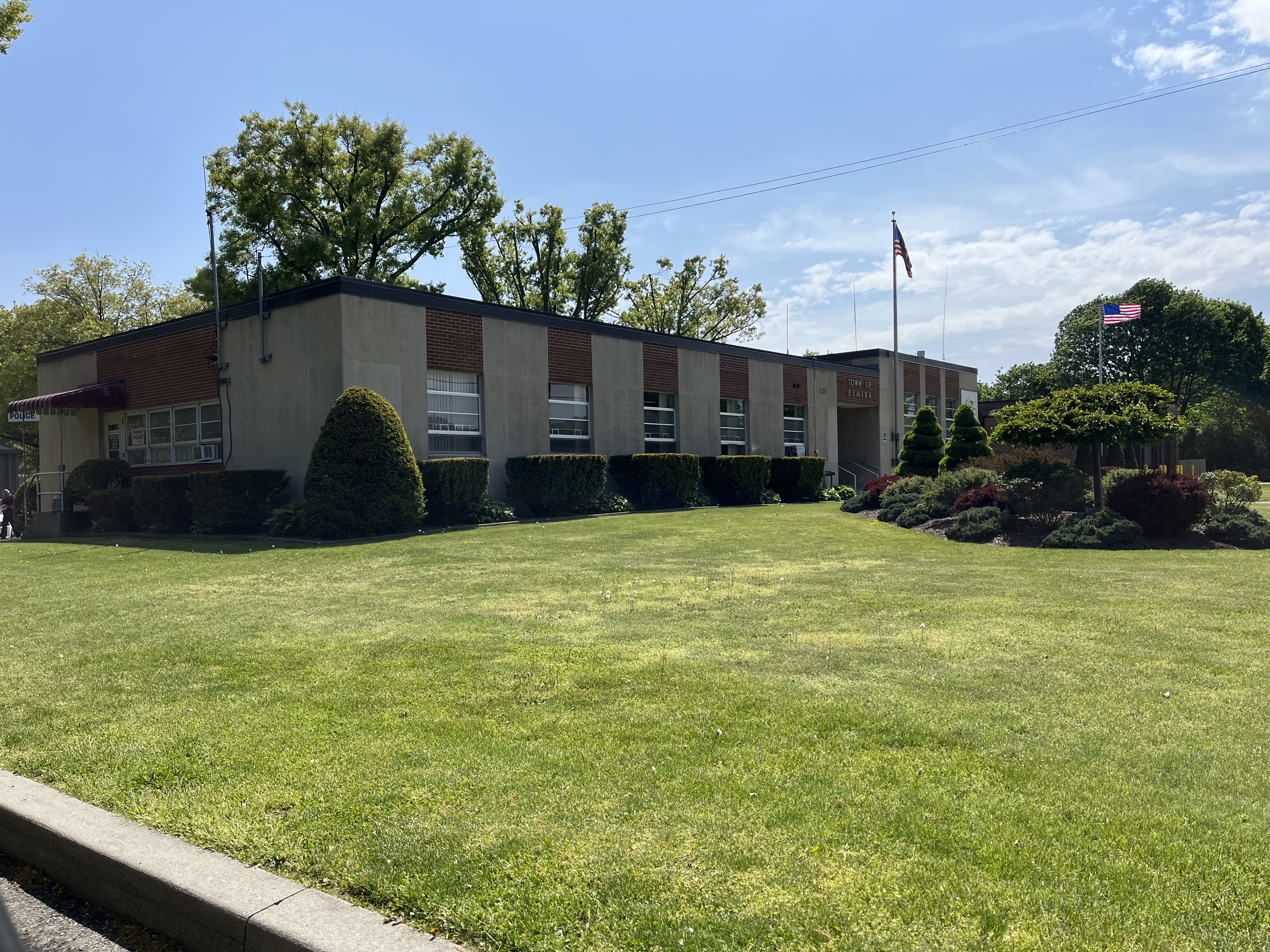
- Elmira town hall
- Motto: "A Great Place to Live"
- Location within New York Location within the United States
- Coordinates: 42°5′30″N 76°50′2″W
- Country: United States
- State: New York
- County: Chemung

Government
  - Type: Town Council
  - Town Supervisor: David P. Sullivan
  - Town Council: Members' List: • Scott Bush; • Albert Lucarelli; • Thomas Milliken; • Ronald E. Allison

Area
  - Total: 22.54 sq mi (58.37 km^{2})
  - Land: 22.21 sq mi (57.52 km^{2})
  - Water: 0.33 sq mi (0.85 km^{2})
- Elevation: 1,178 ft (359 m)

Population (2020)
  - Total: 6,872 ▼
  - Estimate (2021): 6,740
  - Density: 301.3/sq mi (116.32/km^{2})
- Time zone: UTC-5 (Eastern (EST))
  - Summer (DST): UTC-4 (EDT)
- ZIP codes: 14901 (Elmira); 14903 (Elmira Heights); 14905 (Elmira); 14861 (Lowman)
- Area code: 607
- FIPS code: 36-24240
- GNIS feature ID: 0978939
- Website: townofelmira.gov

Elmira is a town in Chemung County, New York, United States. It surrounds the city of Elmira on three sides. The town's population was 6,872 at the 2020 census. The town is in the south-central part of the county, in the Southern Tier of New York. It is part of the Elmira Metropolitan Statistical Area.

== History ==
The Sullivan Expedition of 1779 passed through the area and fought the British at the Battle of Newtown in the southern part of the current town.

The town of Elmira was formed from the town of Chemung in 1792 as the town of Newtown. In 1808, the town changed its name to Elmira.

In 1798, the town of Catharine was formed from Elmira. (It is now in Schuyler County.) Other towns formed from the town of Elmira are Big Flats (1822), Southport (1822), and Catlin (1823).

The main settlement of Elmira set itself off from the town in 1828, becoming the Village of Elmira. The village, absorbing more of the town over the years, became the City of Elmira in 1864.

== Geography ==
According to the United States Census Bureau, the town has a total area of 22.5 square miles (58.4 km^{2}), of which 22.2 square miles (57.5 km^{2}) is land and 0.35 square miles (0.9 km^{2}), or 1.46%, is water. The Chemung River, a tributary of the Susquehanna River, forms part of the southern town line, and Newtown Creek partly divides the town from the city of Elmira.

The Southern Tier Expressway (Interstate 86 and NY Route 17) passes through the town in a northwest-southeast direction. New York State Route 352 passes through the south part of the town and into the city of Elmira.

== Demographics ==
Historical population
Census	Pop.	Note	%±
1820	2,975		—
1830	2,962		−0.4%
1840	4,791		61.7%
1850	8,166		70.4%
1860	8,682		6.3%
1870	1,190		−86.3%
1880	1,986		66.9%
1890	890		−55.2%
1900	1,260		41.6%
1910	1,605		27.4%
1920	2,651		65.2%
1930	5,084		91.8%
1940	5,290		4.1%
1950	6,346		20.0%
1960	8,413		32.6%
1970	8,408		−0.1%
1980	7,635		−9.2%
1990	7,440		−2.6%
2000	7,199		−3.2%
2010	6,934		−3.7%
2020	6,872		−0.9%
2021 (est.)	6,740		−1.9%
U.S. Decennial Census

As of the census of 2000, there were 7,199 people, 3,019 households, and 2,049 families residing in the town. The population density was 323.0 inhabitants per square mile (124.7/km^{2}). There were 3,183 housing units at an average density of 142.8 per square mile (55.1/km^{2}). The racial makeup of the town was 96.31% White, 1.49% Black or African American, 0.11% Native American, 1.22% Asian, 0.15% from other races, and 0.72% from two or more races. Hispanic or Latino of any race were 0.43% of the population.

There were 3,019 households, out of which 28.8% had children under the age of 18 living with them, 56.4% were married couples living together, 8.4% had a female householder with no husband present, and 32.1% were non-families. 28.3% of all households were made up of individuals, and 15.2% had someone living alone who was 65 years of age or older. The average household size was 2.37 and the average family size was 2.90.

In the town, the population was spread out, with 23.4% under the age of 18, 5.4% from 18 to 24, 24.4% from 25 to 44, 27.0% from 45 to 64, and 19.8% who were 65 years of age or older. The median age was 43 years. For every 100 females, there were 89.5 males. For every 100 females age 18 and over, there were 85.0 males.

The median income for a household in the town was $46,641, and the median income for a family was $56,772. Males had a median income of $37,676 versus $29,473 for females. The per capita income for the town was $26,335. About 3.1% of families and 5.5% of the population were below the poverty line, including 7.1% of those under age 18 and 0.7% of those age 65 or over.

== Communities and locations in the Town of Elmira ==
- East Elmira – A hamlet in the southeastern corner of the town at the junction of County Roads 1 and 2.
- Elmira – The city of Elmira, occupying the former western part of the town.
- Elmira Heights – The southern part of the village of Elmira Heights.
- Newtown Battlefield State Park – An historical park in the southeastern part of the town.
- West Elmira – A hamlet southwest of the city of Elmira on NY 352, next to the Chemung River.

== Notable people ==
- Elmira is the birthplace of film director Hal Roach (1892–1992).
