= Breesport, New York =

- Census-designated place
- Location within New York Location within the United States
- Coordinates: 42°10′24″N 076°44′02″W
- Country: United States
- State: New York
- County: Chemung County
- Town: Horseheads

Area
  - Total: 1.64 sq mi (4.25 km^{2})
  - Land: 1.63 sq mi (4.22 km^{2})
  - Water: 0.012 sq mi (0.03 km^{2})
- Elevation: 1,099 ft (335 m)

Population (2020)
  - Total: 629
  - Density: 386.2/sq mi (149.12/km^{2})
- Time zone: UTC-5 (Eastern (EST))
  - Summer (DST): UTC-4 (EDT)
- ZIP Codes: 14816 (Breesport); 14838 (Erin)
- Area code: 607
- FIPS code: 36-08004
- GNIS feature ID: 944682

Breesport is a hamlet and census-designated place in the town of Horseheads in Chemung County, New York, United States. As of the 2020 census, Breesport had a population of 629.

== Geography ==
Breesport is located on the eastern side of the town of Horseheads at 42°10′24″N 076°44′02″W (42.173408, -76.733841). Its elevation is 1,099 feet (335 m). Its eastern edge is the border between Horseheads and the town of Erin. New York State Route 223 passes through the center of Breesport, leading west 3 miles (5 km) to NY-13 near the village of Horseheads and east 3.5 miles (5.6 km) to Erin.

According to the United States Census Bureau, Breesport has a total area of 1.640 square miles (4.25 km^{2}), of which 1.628 square miles (4.22 km^{2}) is land and 0.012 square miles (0.03 km^{2}) is water.

== Demographics ==
Historical population
Census	Pop.	Note	%±
2020	629		—
U.S. Decennial Census

== History ==
As early as 1816 there were two log cabins on the land that would eventually become a part of Breesport. The majority of the early settlers came from two areas: Orange County, Connecticut and Lancaster County, Pennsylvania. From Orange County, came the Staples, Treat, Harding, and Crandall families, and from Lancaster County came the Heller family. The Heller family is credited with building the first sawmill in 1830, only two years after settling. In the early nineteenth-century, many other people, including Silas Breese, A. Schoonover, Benjamin Smith, Israel Boyer, and David, Joel, and Israel Heller settled on Breesport land. It was not until 1854 that land was surveyed for village plots by Azariah Breese. Shortly after, in the fall of that year, a frame building was built on land that was later used for the Rodbourn House. The Rodbourn House was a hotel that officially opened in January 1855. In the spring of that year, Ulysses and William R. Breese (brothers and nephews of Azariah Breese) created the first store across the street from the hotel.

=== Breesport industry ===
During the second half of the nineteenth century, Breesport experienced a period of rapid growth and prosperity, which is largely attributed to the Rodbourns. The first steam-powered mill in Breesport (which produced 3,000,000 feet of lumber yearly) was built by Joseph Rodbourn in 1857. The mill was located between the school and railroad right of way until it burned in 1898. Several years later, in 1860, Rodbourn also constructed the first grist mill. Furthermore, he constructed the “Rodbourn House” and funded the UI&E railroad (Utica, Ithaca, and Elmira Railroad) with Ezra Cornell. For several years a railroad car repair shop was even located in Breesport, until it was devastated by fire in 1883. Years later, on December 22, 1894, Rodbourn died.

Adam Kinley was another economic leader in Breesport during the late nineteenth century. He was instrumental in the development of numerous brickyards along Newton Creek. This included the Losie Yard and the Weir and Kinley yard. Both yards had their own boarding house and railroad spur line. Kinley also bought the Breesport tannery in 1890 and ran it with his two sons, Charles and Ward. However, in 1911 the tannery was devastated by two fires. The February fire took the life of employee William Amberg, and the May fire left eighty men without jobs. Two years later, at the age of 89, Adam Kinley died.

In the late nineteenth century and early twentieth century, there were also numerous grist mills. The Hull-less Oatmeal Co. specialized in grinding buckwheat and was operated by G.A. Campbell. There was also a feed mill owned by Otis Kinley, grandson of Adam Kinley. In 1922, it was ruined by fire, but was rebuilt soon after. However, when the railroad no longer ran through Breesport, the mill closed.

=== Stores and hotels ===
During this time, there were numerous stores and small hotels as well. At one time, there were two stores, John Van Gorden & Co. and the Harding Brothers. The Harding Brothers store was established in 1870 at the intersection of Jackson Creek Road and Route 223. Prior to being the Harding Brothers general store, the wood structure was a store named “Creed’s.” Like many of the other buildings in Breesport, the Harding Brother's General store was devastated by fire. However, with the help of Elmira Banker, John Arnot, the store was reconstructed. There were also two hotels at one point during Breesport's early history, the Rodbourn House, run by Charles E. Breese, and the Batterson House, run under the direction of James Batterson. Prior to becoming the Batterson House, the hotel changed names and hands several times. During the Civil War, it was operated by Warren Lincoln. Afterwards, Barzella Burgess turned the hotel into a store and post office. After becoming the Batterson house, it changed hands once again, and was named the Harden Hotel.

=== Summary ===
Now, in the twenty-first-century there is very little evidence of the prosperous industries that populated the area. At one time during its early history, Breesport had two creameries, two blacksmiths, three brickyards, one custom wool and carding mill, one carriage and repair shop, two custom boot and shoe shops, one harness shop, a drug store, an undertaking establishment, and a cheese box factory. By the 1950s, according to the Elmira Sunday Telegram (local newspaper), only a post office, one garage, one dry cleaning establishment, two churches, and two general stores remained.

== Education ==
The school district is Horseheads Central School District.

== Railroad ==
The railroad was an important economic factor in Breesport during the late nineteenth-century and early twentieth century. It provided transportation to Ithaca, Elmira, and numerous other places for residents. During its many years of operation, it was also the social gathering place for people. The EC&N Railroad connected Erin, Van Etten, and Breesport together. Breesport relied heavily on the railroad, and many of the changes in Breesport were linked to changes in the railroad. In 1872, the Utica, Ithaca and Elmira Railroad (UI&E Railroad) began operation. Two years later, in 1874, numerous shops were built by the UI&E Railroad in Breesport. These shops were eventually moved to Cortland by the new Elmira, Cortland, and Northern railroad company after they burned in 1883. The Elmira, Cortland and Northern was created from the UI&E Railroad and several others in 1884. Years later, in 1896, this railroad became a part of the Lehigh Valley Railroad.

The railroad carried its first passenger in 1872, and the last train passed through Breesport on June 24, 1938. Afterwards, trains traveled from Sayre to Horseheads by the Erie. It was not long until deconstruction of the tracks began.

== Breese Family ==
Breesport was named after the Breese family, specifically brothers Ulysses and William, who are credited with creating the village during the 1800s. They are related to the original settler in Horseheads, John Breese, and are the sons of Silas Breese, one of the early settlers in what would become Breesport. Ulysses Breese is also responsible for establishing the first post office in Breesport on November 19, 1853. Moses P. Breese was the first person to assume the position of postmaster.
