= Elmira High School (New York) =

Location
- 777 South Main Street; Elmira, New York 14904
- Coordinates: 42°04′07″N 76°47′46″W

Information
- School type: Public, high school
- Motto: Express Yourself
- School district: Elmira City School District
- NCES School ID: 361056000824
- Principal: Christopher Reger
- Staff: 60.74 (FTE)
- Grades: 10–12
- Enrollment: 1,255 (2023-2024)
- Student to teacher ratio: 20.66
- Colors: red, black, and white
- Athletics conference: Southern Tier Athletic Conference; Section IV NYSPHSAA
- Mascot: The Conductor
- Website: elmirahighschool.elmiracityschools.com

Elmira High School, commonly referred to as EHS, is a high school in Elmira, New York, United States. It is a part of the Elmira City School District and serves portions of Chemung County. It occupies the campus of Southside High School, which was one of two public high schools operated by the district, alongside Elmira Free Academy, before the two merged into its current state in 2014.

== History ==
The concept to create Southside High School was in a plan released in 1921. On August 1922 the groundbreaking ceremony occurred. Southside High School's first building opened on January 28, 1924. The first principal was Frank M. Edson (died on November 28, 1932). The school district spent $520,376.85 to have the building built. Generally, in the school's history, it took students south of the Chemung River, while Elmira Free Academy took students north of the Chemung River. The school colors were green and white.

The school owned a house across the street that was used for home economics classes. There was a controversy in the 1920s over the price of the student cafeteria being exorbitantly high relative to other cafeterias. In 1935 the school yearbook was renamed the Edsonian after Edson.

In its time of existence, which came shortly after EFA, Southside High had two different buildings in use. Currently, it is using a newly renovated building on South Main Street on Elmira's southside. Prior to the merger, its school colors had been green and white since the establishment of the high school as well as its sports teams, called the Green Hornets.

Southside High stopped using the practice home economics house in the 1950s.

In 1974 the board of trustees decided that Elmira Free Academy should get a recreation center, and this made members of the Southside High community upset that their school did not receive such a facility. The student council decided to hold a protest regarding this. The reaction spurred the board into having a new facility for Southside High.

The last Southside High facility, on a 28.3-acre (11.5 ha) plot of land, opened in fall 1979, with the old building no longer used. The old building became the Chemung County Human Resource Center. The school district acquired the land from Westinghouse Electric Corp; the district paid the company $80,000. The land was formerly used for industrial purposes. James Hare of the Elmira Star-Gazette wrote that at the time, "The matter of exposure to hazardous waste with the construction of a new school in 1977 was a nonissue." Jeff Murray, of the same newspaper, stated "At the time, nobody seemed concerned the property was polluted from more than a century of heavy industrial activity." The site had been used for industrial purposes for around 100 years. The property was formerly used by Remington Rand. Westinghouse initially asked for $400,000 as a purchase price, but lowered it to $80,000, an action that Garth Wade of the Star Gazette stated made the construction of the school possible.

In the 1990s public concern about the former industrial use of the school grounds became widespread.

Until the 2011–2012 school year, Elmira Free Academy would play Southside High School in football for the Erie Bell, a trophy donated to the two schools by a local railroad company. In 2011, it was announced that the long-standing rivalry between the schools would come to an end and they would combine. The two high schools combined their sports teams by the 2011–12 school year. A community vote was taken to determine what new mascot and colors people were interested in. On May 25, 2011, the district officially announced that the new team would be called the Elmira Express, a common nickname for Elmiran legend Ernie Davis, the first African-American to ever win the Heisman Trophy in the sport of football. The team colors became red, black, and white.

The Southside High School cafeteria had 8,379 square feet (778.4 m^{2}) of space.

Circa 2012 the district began changing the building to be the sole high school of the school district. The change to Elmira High School was effective July 1, 2014. The signage began to change around that time. The cafeteria was given a 9,546-square-foot (886.9 m^{2}) expansion, with a cost of $7,000,000. The anticipated enrollment for fall 2014 was 1,450.

The Decker Bell replaced the 64-year Erie Bell tradition. The new Elmira Express combined team has begun somewhat of a new rivalry with the Corning Hawks from two recently combined schools in Corning, New York. Both team combinations were due to severe budget issues that are still imminent and pose a threat to combine the schools altogether. The Elmira budget problem also jeopardizes the education of the students in the district, as well as the futures of the employed staff.

By 2018 there was an industrial waste cleanup effort at Elmira High. A 2018 newspaper article in the Star-Gazette put attention on the industrial past of the site. Unisys is funding the cleanup. Remington Rand, one of the companies that became Unisys, once owned the site. 6,500 tons of soil had been removed from the school grounds that had been deemed contaminated in summer 2017.

In 2022 a new sports complex for Elmira High School was scheduled to open.

== Principals ==
Southside High School:

- Frank M. Edson (1924–1932)
- Clifford McNaught (1932–1952)
- Wallace Howell (1952–1955)
- Arnold Greene (1955–1966)
- Martin Harrigan (1966–1973)
- Jerome O'Dell (1973–1991)
- Kenneth Thomas (1991–1996)
- Daile Rose (1996–January 1999)
- Arline Ely (January 1999 – 2000)
- Lisa Kelly (2000–2003)
- Theresa Armstrong (interim, 2003)
- James Snyder (interim, 2004)
- Christopher Krantz (2004–2014)

Elmira High School:

- Christopher Krantz (2014–2020)
- Christopher Reger (2020–present)

== Notable alumni ==
- Kevin B. Winebold – musical director, actor
