= Ernie Davis Academy =

Location
- 933 Hoffman Street; Elmira, New York 14905
- 42.0962°N 76.8305°W

Information
- School type: Public, high school
- School district: Elmira City School District
- NCES School ID: 361056000814
- Principal: Colin Werfelman
- Grades: 7-8
- Enrollment: 802 (2022–23)
- Colors: Maroon and White
- Mascot: Elmira Express
- Athletic conferences: Southern Tier Athletic Conference; Section IV NYSPHSAA
- Website: erniedavis.elmiracityschools.com

Ernie Davis Academy is the junior high school in Elmira, New York, United States. It occupies the building formerly used by the Elmira Free Academy, a high school, which merged with Southside High School to become Elmira High School in September 2014. It has 855 students in grades 7–8 with a student-teacher ratio of 13 to 1. According to state test scores, 18 percent of students are at least proficient in math and 22 percent in reading.

The building used by the previous junior high school for students from the area north of the Chemung River, Ernie Davis Jr. High School, is now used by a charter elementary school.

== Notable alumni of Ernie Davis Academy (Formerly Elmira Free Academy) ==
- William E. Tuttle Jr. (1887) – U.S. Representative from New Jersey
- Hal Roach (1908) – Film and TV producer with a career spanning much of the 20th century. In 1984, he won the honorary Academy Honorary Award for Lifetime Achievement.
- Ernie Davis (1958) – First African American to win the Heisman Trophy, and two time All-American. Drafted by Washington Redskins and traded to Cleveland Browns before he died from leukemia in 1963.
- Bob DeLaney (1942) – Sports announcer
- Tommy Hilfiger (1969) – Fashion designer and creator of the eponymous "Tommy Hilfiger" and "Tommy" brands.
- Eileen Collins (1974) – Retired Astronaut, first female pilot, commander of the Space Shuttle

== Principals of Elmira Free Academy/Ernie Davis Academy ==
- Colin Werfelman: 2022–Present
- Carrie Rollins: 2014–2021
- John Wood: 2013–2014 (beginning of Ernie Davis Academy)
- Chris Krantz: 2012–2013 (end of Elmira Free Academy)
- John Wood: 2008–2012
- Scott Williams: 2006–2008
- Robert Bailey III: 2000–2006
- John Walker: 1996–2000
- Theodore V. Faber: 1995–1996
- Cynthia H. Haigh: 1994–1995
- Joseph H. Nikiel: 1988–1994
- Daile Rose: 1984–1988
- Dr. William J Doran: 1981–1984
- Martin Harrigan: 1973–1980
- G. Ellsworth Bradley: 1969–1973
- Kenneth S. Weaver: 1954–1969
- Albert Helmkamp: 1936–1954
- Francis Parker: 1906–1936
- Howard Conant: 1900–1906
- Charles Evans: 1895–1900
- Herbert Lovell: 1887–1895
- James Monks: 1872–1887
- Joel Dorman Steele: 1866–1872
- G.W. Timlow: 1865–1866
- Isaac Mortimer Wellington: 1860–1865
- Moses Summer Converse: 1859–1860
