= Erin, New York =

- Town
- Location within New York Location within the United States
- Coordinates: 42°11′1″N 76°40′31″W
- Country: United States
- State: New York
- County: Chemung

Government
  - Type: Town Council
  - Town Supervisor: Donald N. Bower, Jr. (D)
  - Town Council: Members' List: • James E. Leonard; • Kenneth Austin; • Merton T. Burlew; • Daniel Cleveland

Area
  - Total: 44.47 sq mi (115.17 km^{2})
  - Land: 44.25 sq mi (114.60 km^{2})
  - Water: 0.22 sq mi (0.57 km^{2})
- Elevation: 1,243 ft (379 m)

Population (2020)
  - Total: 1,820 ▼
  - Estimate (2021): 1,788
  - Density: 42.8/sq mi (16.54/km^{2})
- Time zone: UTC-5 (Eastern (EST))
  - Summer (DST): UTC-4 (EDT)
- ZIP code: 14838 (Erin); 14816 (Breesport); 14824 (Cayuta); 14861 (Lowman)
- Area code: 607
- FIPS code: 36-015-24636
- GNIS feature ID: 0978942
- Website: townoferinny.gov

Erin is a town in Chemung County, New York, United States. The population was 1,820 at the 2020 census. The town was named by early settlers from Ireland.

The town is east of Elmira and is along the county's northern border. It is part of the Elmira Metropolitan Statistical Area.

== History ==
The area that would become the town was first settled before 1816. The town of Erin was formed in 1822 from the town of Chemung.

The Scotchtown Cemetery was listed on the National Register of Historic Places in 2008.

The Erin Volunteer Fire Department was founded on May 5, 1955. Land donated by the late Merton Schanbacker was used to build the first fire station. Later in 1998 the current fire station was built adjacent to the original fire station. The current fire department operates with roughly 25 all volunteer members and 6 well equipped apparatus which include an EMS ambulance (882), a rescue truck (881), an Engine (831), a Tanker (861), a brush truck (871) and a UTV (872).

== Geography ==
According to the United States Census Bureau, the town has a total area of 44.5 square miles (115.2 km^{2}), of which 44.2 square miles (114.6 km^{2}) is land and 0.23 square miles (0.6 km^{2}), or 0.50%, is water. Newtown Creek, a tributary of the Chemung River, flows westward through the town.

The northern town line is the border of Schuyler County.

Park Station is a 384 acre county park on the north side of town with a 95 acre non motorized lake for fishing, swimming, non motorized boating, ice fishing, ice skating, camping, hiking, picnicking, snow shoeing and cross country skiing. The county charges entrance to the main entrance of the park by the car during summer months. There are 40 camper friendly campsites, 20 of which are private lakeside sites. MOre information can be found on the county's website Park Station Info Page

The town's government is located along New York State Route 223, which passes through Erin.

== Demographics ==
Historical population
Census	Pop.	Note	%±
1830	976		—
1840	1,441		47.6%
1850	1,833		27.2%
1860	1,339		−27.0%
1870	1,392		4.0%
1880	1,562		12.2%
1890	1,289		−17.5%
1900	996		−22.7%
1910	889		−10.7%
1920	761		−14.4%
1930	774		1.7%
1940	789		1.9%
1950	930		17.9%
1960	1,175		26.3%
1970	1,669		42.0%
1980	2,037		22.0%
1990	2,002		−1.7%
2000	2,054		2.6%
2010	1,962		−4.5%
2020	1,820		−7.2%
2021 (est.)	1,788	▼	−1.8%
U.S. Decennial Census

As of the census of 2000, there were 2,054 people, 751 households, and 608 families residing in the town. The population density was 46.3 inhabitants per square mile (17.9/km^{2}). There were 794 housing units at an average density of 17.9 per square mile (6.9/km^{2}). The racial makeup of the town was 98.59% White, 0.15% African American, 0.39% Native American, 0.39% Asian, and 0.49% from two or more races. Hispanic or Latino of any race were 0.44% of the population.

There were 751 households, out of which 37.2% had children under the age of 18 living with them, 64.7% were married couples living together, 9.5% had a female householder with no husband present, and 19.0% were non-families. 14.9% of all households were made up of individuals, and 5.1% had someone living alone who was 65 years of age or older. The average household size was 2.74 and the average family size was 2.97.

In the town, the population was spread out, with 26.0% under the age of 18, 7.5% from 18 to 24, 30.2% from 25 to 44, 27.0% from 45 to 64, and 9.3% who were 65 years of age or older. The median age was 37 years. For every 100 females, there were 105.8 males. For every 100 females age 18 and over, there were 99.3 males.

The median income for a household in the town was $41,795, and the median income for a family was $44,032. Males had a median income of $31,635 versus $21,520 for females. The per capita income for the town was $16,747. About 4.6% of families and 7.5% of the population were below the poverty line, including 9.7% of those under age 18 and 8.9% of those age 65 or over.

== Communities and locations in the town of Erin ==
- Erin – The hamlet (and census-designated place) of Erin is in the south-central part of the town, located on NY 223 and Newtown Creek and County Road 4.
- Herringtons Corners – A former location in the southern part of the town.
- Langdon Hill – An elevation in the southwestern corner of the town.
- Park Station – A location near the northern town line.
- South Erin – A hamlet in the southern part of the town.
