= Millport, New York =

- Village
- Location within the state of New York
- Coordinates: 42°16′3″N 76°50′10″W
- Country: United States
- State: New York
- County: Chemung
- Town: Veteran

Area
  - Total: 0.35 sq mi (0.90 km^{2})
  - Land: 0.35 sq mi (0.90 km^{2})
  - Water: 0 sq mi (0.00 km^{2})
- Elevation: 719 ft (219 m)

Population (2020)
  - Total: 301
  - Density: 865.1/sq mi (334.02/km^{2})
- Time zone: UTC-5 (Eastern (EST))
  - Summer (DST): UTC-4 (EDT)
- ZIP code: 14864
- Area code: 607
- FIPS code: 36-47427
- GNIS feature ID: 0957345
- Website: millportny.gov

Millport is a village in Chemung County, New York, United States. As of the 2020 census, Millport had a population of 301. The name comes from its former status as a canal port.

Millport is in the northwest quadrant of the town of Veteran and is north of Elmira. The mail ZIP code is 14864. It is part of the Elmira Metropolitan Statistical Area.

== History ==
The Sullivan Expedition of 1779 passed through the area.

The town's first settler, Green Bently, purchased and developed farmland on the site of the village in 1798. The community was once known as "Millvale" after the village was laid out in 1825. The name was changed to "Millport" in 1829 to recognize its new status by the Chemung Canal which passed by the village. The presence of the canal helped raise the population about 1,000 for a time. Catharine Creek, a north-flowing tributary of Seneca Lake, flows through the village.

In the 1840s, several epidemics reduced the population of Millport.

== Geography ==
Millport is located in northwestern Chemung County at 42°16′3″N 76°50′10″W (42.267634, -76.836122).

According to the United States Census Bureau, the village has a total area of 0.35 square miles (0.9 km^{2}), all land.

New York State Route 14 passes through the village, which is at the junction of County Road 6A.

== Demographics ==
Historical population
Census	Pop.	Note	%±
1880	500		—
1930	389		—
1940	340		−12.6%
1950	362		6.5%
1960	425		17.4%
1970	480		12.9%
1980	440		−8.3%
1990	342		−22.3%
2000	297		−13.2%
2010	312		5.1%
2020	301		−3.5%
U.S. Decennial Census

As of the census of 2000, there were 297 people, 118 households, and 77 families residing in the village. The population density was 821.0 inhabitants per square mile (317.0/km^{2}). There were 132 housing units at an average density of 364.9 per square mile (140.9/km^{2}). The racial makeup of the village was 96.97% White, 1.01% Native American, 0.34% from other races, and 1.68% from two or more races. Hispanic or Latino of any race were 2.02% of the population.

There were 118 households, out of which 32.2% had children under the age of 18 living with them, 44.9% were married couples living together, 13.6% had a female householder with no husband present, and 33.9% were non-families. 28.8% of all households were made up of individuals, and 15.3% had someone living alone who was 65 years of age or older. The average household size was 2.52 and the average family size was 3.03.

In the village, the population was spread out, with 25.6% under the age of 18, 5.7% from 18 to 24, 33.0% from 25 to 44, 23.6% from 45 to 64, and 12.1% who were 65 years of age or older. The median age was 38 years. For every 100 females, there were 100.7 males. For every 100 females age 18 and over, there were 97.3 males.

The median income for a household in the village was $31,250, and the median income for a family was $40,500. Males had a median income of $26,875 versus $17,500 for females. The per capita income for the village was $15,739. About 6.1% of families and 12.8% of the population were below the poverty line, including 17.0% of those under the age of eighteen and 12.8% of those 65 or over.
