= Chemung County, New York =

County in New York, United States

- County
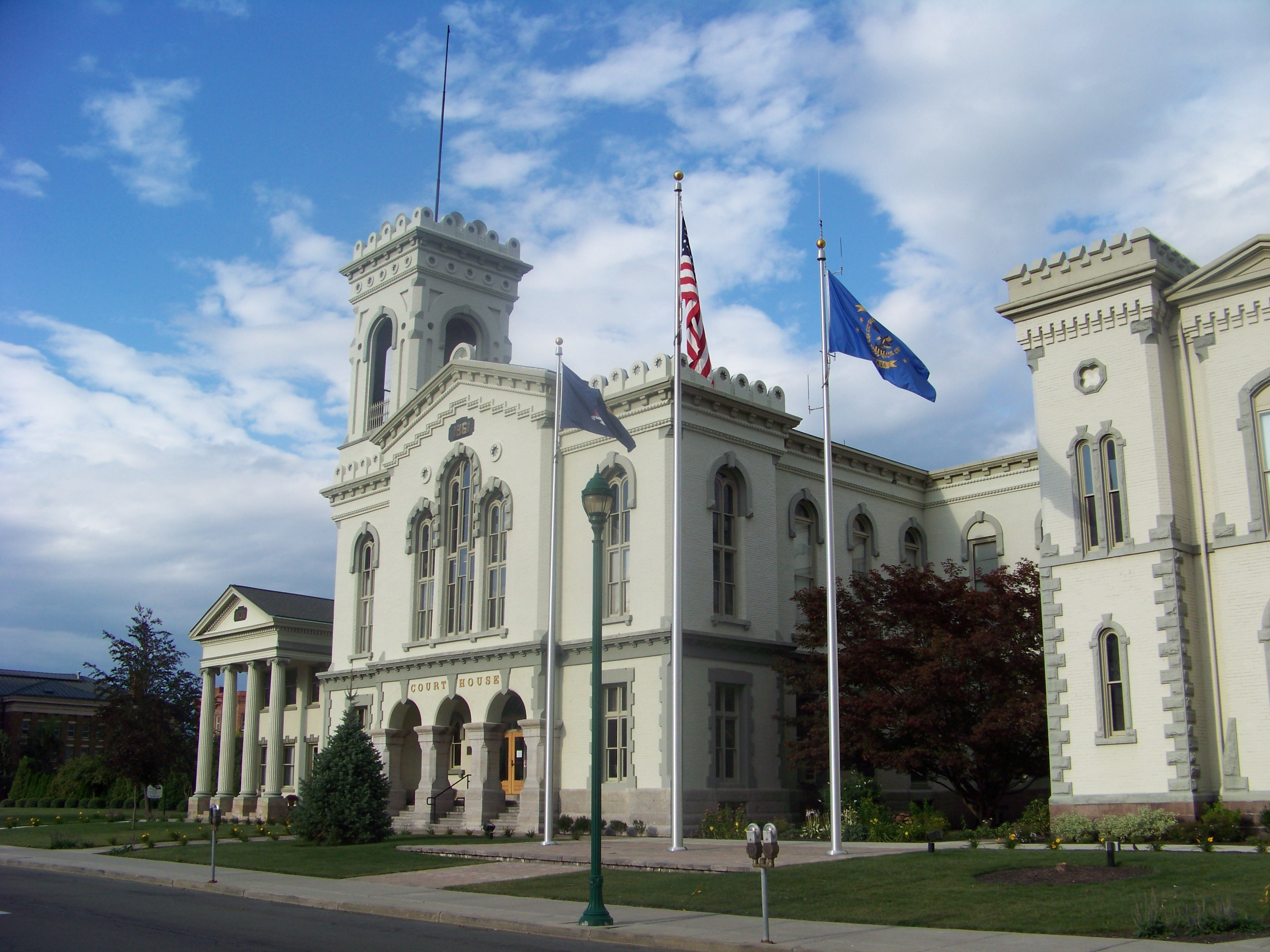
- Chemung County Courthouse

- Seal

- Location within the U.S. state of New York
- Coordinates: 42°08′N 76°46′W
- Country: United States
- State: New York
- Founded: March 29, 1836
- Named for: Unami for "big horn"
- Seat: Elmira
- Largest city: Elmira

Government
  - Executive: Christopher J. Moss

Area
  - Total: 411 sq mi (1,060 km^{2})
  - Land: 407 sq mi (1,050 km^{2})
  - Water: 3.4 sq mi (8.8 km^{2}) 0.8%

Population (2020)
  - Total: 84,148
  - Estimate (2025): 80,415 ▼
  - Density: 207/sq mi (79.8/km^{2})
- Time zone: UTC−5 (Eastern)
  - Summer (DST): UTC−4 (EDT)
- Congressional district: 23rd
- Website: www.chemungcountyny.gov

Chemung County is a county in the U.S. state of New York. The population was 84,148 as of the 2020 census. Its county seat is Elmira. Its name is derived from a Delaware Indian village whose name means "big horn" in a Lenape language. The county is part of the Southern Tier region of the state.

Chemung County comprises the Elmira, NY Metropolitan Statistical Area, which is also included in the Elmira-Corning, NY Combined Statistical Area.

Many signs posted along roads in Chemung County refer to the area as "Mark Twain Country," because the noted author summered and wrote for many years in Elmira.

== History ==
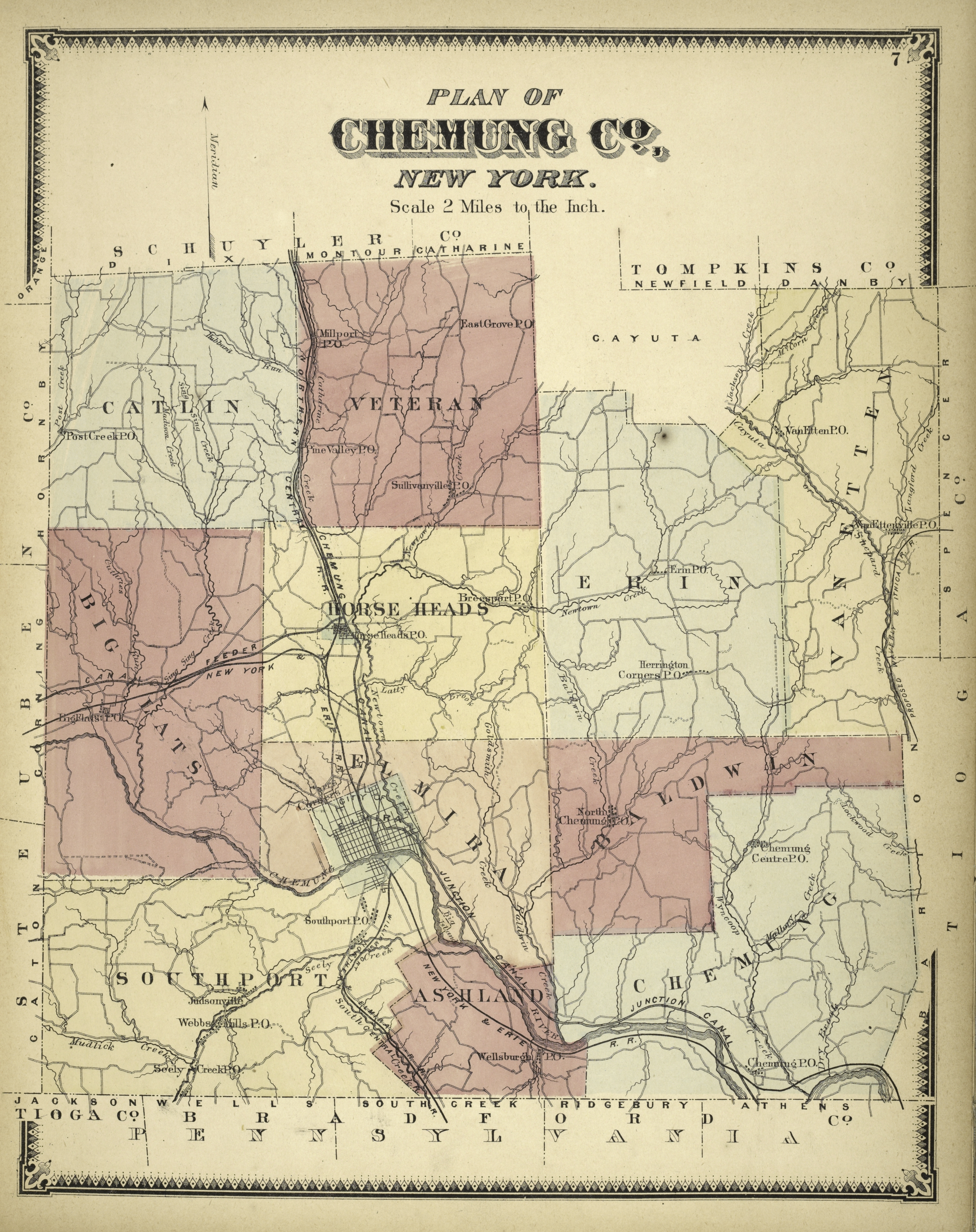
1869 map of Chemung County

Chemung County was formed from 520 square miles (1,300 km^{2}) of Tioga County in 1836.

In 1854, Chemung County was divided and 110 square miles (280 km^{2}) became Schuyler County, reducing Chemung to 410 square miles (1,100 km^{2}), its current size.

In the late 1870s, the Greenback Party became prominent in Chemung and nearby counties in western New York. Here it was primarily allied with labor in a critique of capital, reaching its peak in 1878, the year following the Great Railroad Strike of 1877 and the Scranton general strike in Pennsylvania. There were also strikes that year in Albany, Syracuse and Buffalo, starting with the railroad workers. In Steuben and Chemung counties, Greenbackers were elected to county councils in 1878 instead of Democrats, and others were elected from there and nearby counties to the state legislature, gaining votes of more than 25 percent in several of the Southern Tier counties. It gradually declined after that, due to internal dissension and the strength of the two major parties.

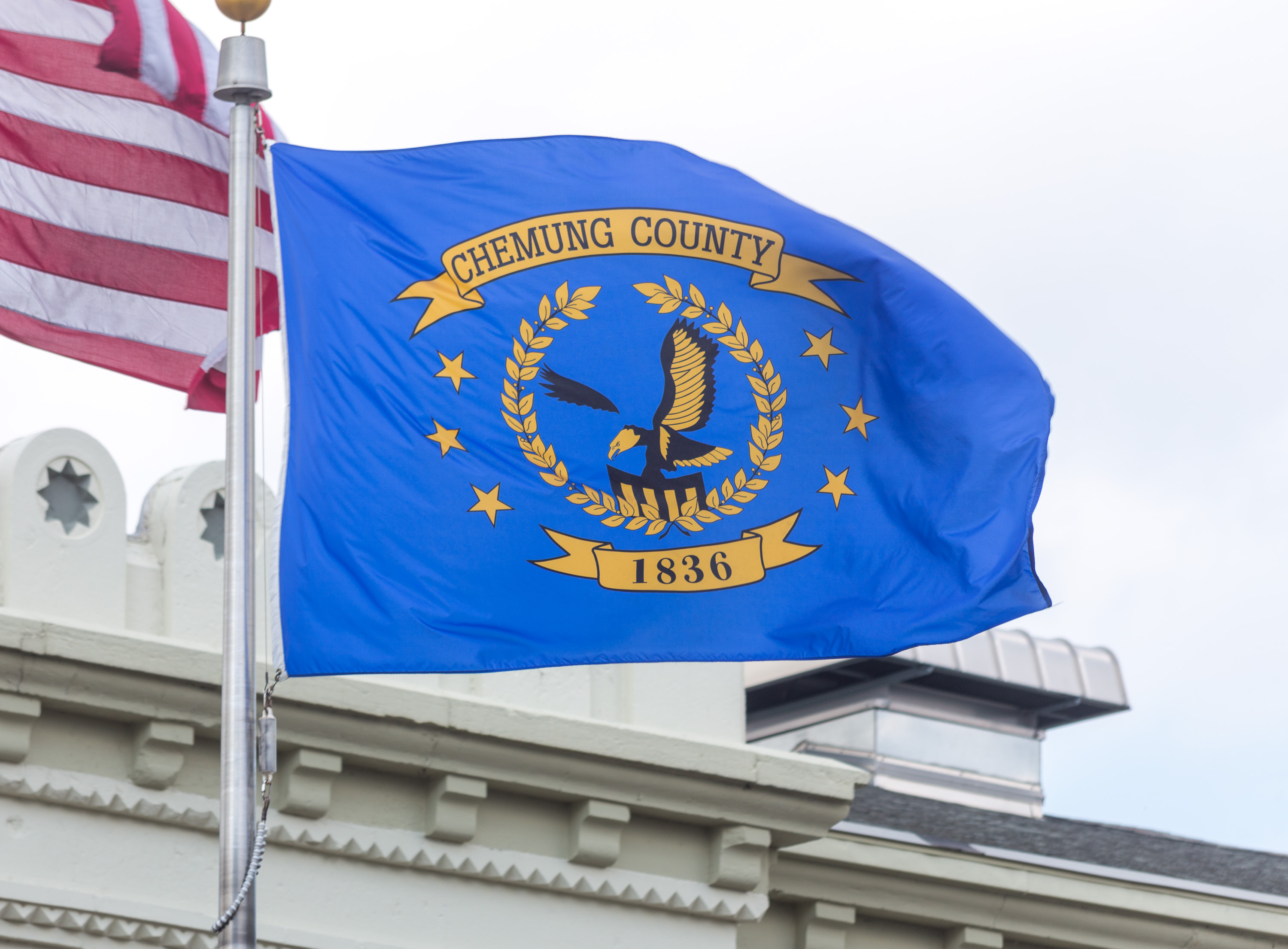
Flag of Chemung County, at the Chemung County Courthouse

== Geography ==
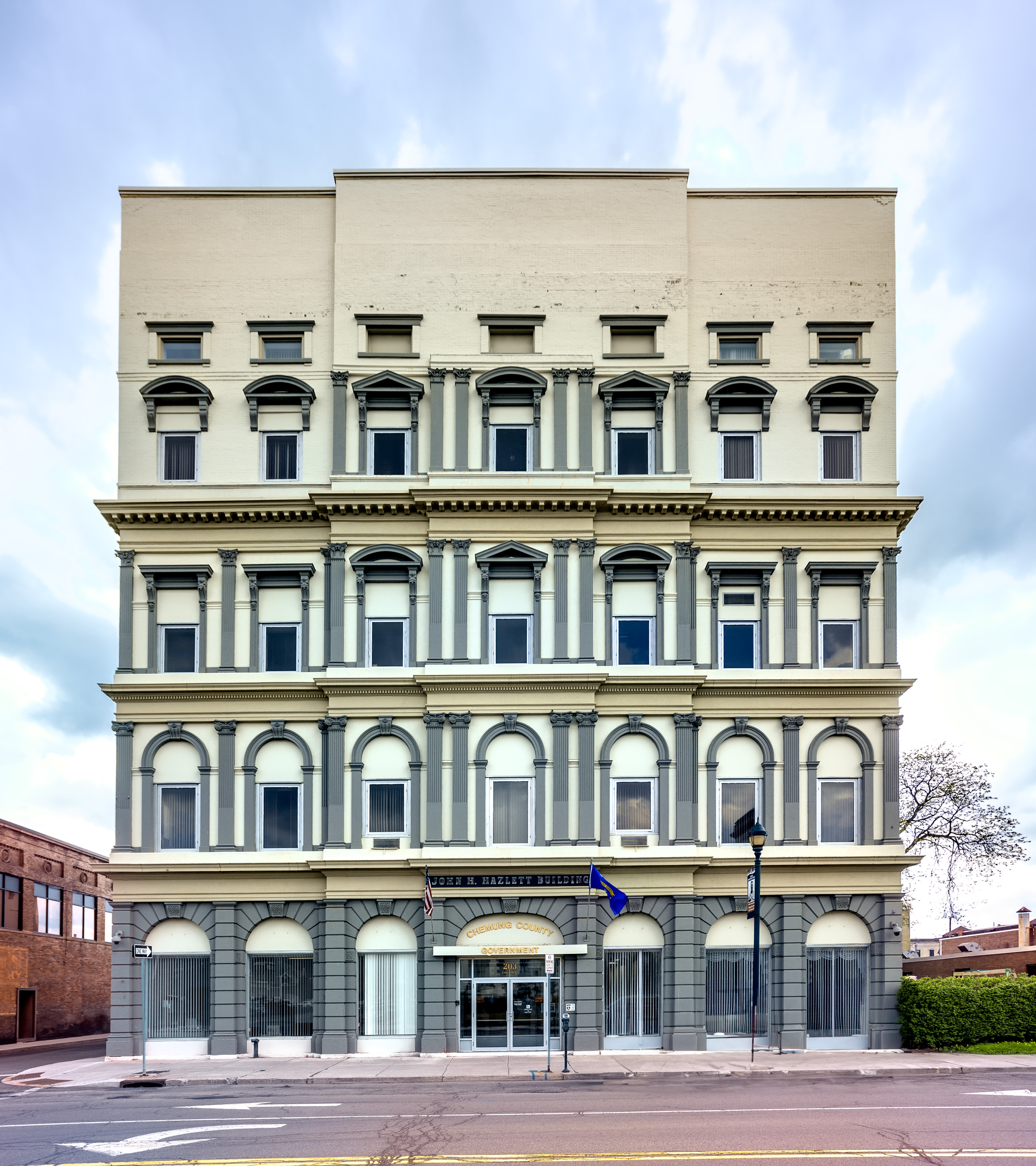
The Chemung County Government Building in Elmira

According to the U.S. Census Bureau, the county has a total area of 411 square miles (1,060 km^{2}), of which 407 square miles (1,050 km^{2}) is land and 3.4 square miles (8.8 km^{2}) (0.8%) is water.

Chemung County is in the southwestern part of New York State, along the Pennsylvania border, in a part of New York called the Southern Tier and is also part of the Finger Lakes Region.

The Southern Tier Expressway runs through the County east-west near the Pennsylvania border, between Waverly, New York and Corning, New York via Elmira, New York.

== Transportation ==
=== Major highways ===
- Interstate 86 / New York State Route 17 (Southern Tier Expressway)
- New York State Route 13
- New York State Route 14
- New York State Route 34
- New York State Route 223
- New York State Route 328
- New York State Route 352
- New York State Route 367
- New York State Route 414
- New York State Route 427

=== Airport ===
- Elmira Corning Regional Airport

== Demographics ==
Historical population
Census	Pop.	Note	%±
1840	20,732		—
1850	28,821		39.0%
1860	26,917		−6.6%
1870	35,281		31.1%
1880	43,065		22.1%
1890	48,265		12.1%
1900	54,063		12.0%
1910	54,662		1.1%
1920	65,872		20.5%
1930	74,680		13.4%
1940	73,718		−1.3%
1950	86,827		17.8%
1960	98,706		13.7%
1970	101,537		2.9%
1980	97,656		−3.8%
1990	95,195		−2.5%
2000	91,070		−4.3%
2010	88,830		−2.5%
2020	84,148		−5.3%
2025 (est.)	80,415	▼	−4.4%
U.S. Decennial Census; 1790-1960 1900-1990; 1990-2000 2010-2020

=== 2020 census ===
Chemung County, New York – Racial and ethnic composition Note: the US Census treats Hispanic/Latino as an ethnic category. This table excludes Latinos from the racial categories and assigns them to a separate category. Hispanics/Latinos may be of any race.
Race / Ethnicity (NH = Non-Hispanic)	Pop 1980	Pop 1990	Pop 2000	Pop 2010	Pop 2020	% 1980	% 1990	% 2000	% 2010	% 2020
White alone (NH)	92,196	87,800	82,131	77,643	69,559	94.41%	92.23%	90.18%	87.41%	82.66%
Black or African American alone (NH)	3,883	4,913	5,150	5,528	5,009	3.98%	5.16%	5.65%	6.22%	5.95%
Native American or Alaska Native alone (NH)	149	189	188	206	198	0.15%	0.20%	0.21%	0.23%	0.24%
Asian alone (NH)	397	649	707	1,041	1,426	0.41%	0.68%	0.78%	1.17%	1.69%
Native Hawaiian or Pacific Islander alone (NH)	x	x	15	14	15	x	x	0.02%	0.02%	0.02%
Other race alone (NH)	163	203	111	96	228	0.17%	0.21%	0.12%	0.11%	0.27%
Mixed race or Multiracial (NH)	x	x	1,159	2,062	4,775	x	x	1.27%	2.32%	5.67%
Hispanic or Latino (any race)	868	1,441	1,609	2,240	2,938	0.89%	1.51%	1.77%	2.52%	3.49%
Total	97,656	95,195	91,070	88,830	84,148	100.00%	100.00%	100.00%	100.00%	100.00%

=== 2000 Census ===
As of the 2000 census, there were 91,070 people, 35,049 households and 23,272 families residing in the county. The population density was 223 people per square mile (86 people/km^{2}). There were 37,745 housing units at an average density of 92 units per square mile (36/km^{2}). The racial makeup of the county was 90.96% White, 5.82% Black or African American, 0.23% Native American, 0.78% Asian, 0.02% Pacific Islander, 0.75% from other races, and 1.44% from two or more races. 1.77% of the population were Hispanic or Latino of any race. 16.4% were of German, 15.7% Irish, 12.5% English, 11.8% Italian, 7.8% American and 6.3% Polish ancestry according to Census 2000 . Most of those claiming to be of "American" ancestry are of English descent and, in upstate New York, also in some cases of Dutch descent, but have family that has been in the country for so long, in many cases since the early seventeenth century, that they choose to identify simply as "American". 96.2% spoke English and 1.6% Spanish as their first language.

There were 35,049 households, of which 31.00% had children under the age of 18 living with them, 49.80% were married couples living together, 12.40% had a female householder with no husband present, and 33.60% were non-families. 27.90% of all households were made up of individuals, and 12.20% had someone living alone who was 65 years of age or older. The average household size was 2.44 and the average family size was 2.97.

Age distribution was 24.40% under the age of 18, 8.80% from 18 to 24, 28.30% from 25 to 44, 22.90% from 45 to 64, and 15.60% who were 65 years of age or older. The median age was 38 years. For every 100 females there were 97.70 males. For every 100 females age 18 and over, there were 95.30 males.

The median household income was $36,415, and the median family income was $43,994. Males had a median income of $35,076 versus $24,215 for females. The per capita income for the county was $18,264. About 9.10% of families and 13.00% of the population were below the poverty line, including 18.40% of those under age 18 and 6.80% of those age 65 or over.

== Government ==
Before 1974, Chemung County was governed by a board of supervisors. On January 1, 1974, executive and legislative powers were split between a county executive and a 15-seat legislature. All 15 members are elected from single-member districts. As of 2024, the Chemung County Legislature includes 13 Republicans and 2 Democrats. Chemung County is a part of the 23rd congressional district, represented by Republican Nick Langworthy.

Chemung County Executives
Name	Party	Term
John H. Hazlett	Republican	January 1, 1974 – 1975
Morris E. Blostein	Republican	1975 – 1979
R. Stanley Benjamin	Republican	1979 – 1983
Robert G. Densberger	Republican	1983 – 1991
G. Thomas Tranter Jr.	Republican	1991 – 2000
Thomas J. Santulli	Republican	2000 – 2019
Christopher J. Moss	Republican	2019 –

United States presidential election results for Chemung County, New York
Year	Republican		Democratic		Third party(ies)	
Year	No.	%	No.	%	No.	%
1884	5,198	48.51%	4,719	44.04%	798	7.45%
1888	5,467	45.95%	6,037	50.74%	394	3.31%
1892	5,410	48.41%	4,661	41.71%	1,104	9.88%
1896	7,926	58.34%	5,259	38.71%	401	2.95%
1900	6,921	49.45%	6,531	46.66%	545	3.89%
1904	7,282	53.29%	5,641	41.28%	741	5.42%
1908	7,410	53.11%	5,966	42.76%	576	4.13%
1912	3,317	25.54%	6,008	46.27%	3,660	28.19%
1916	6,409	43.59%	7,461	50.74%	834	5.67%
1920	17,864	68.53%	7,060	27.08%	1,144	4.39%
1924	18,599	64.66%	7,162	24.90%	3,004	10.44%
1928	25,029	67.00%	12,189	32.63%	136	0.36%
1932	20,152	57.99%	13,825	39.78%	773	2.22%
1936	20,515	56.68%	15,542	42.94%	138	0.38%
1940	22,156	59.08%	15,203	40.54%	140	0.37%
1944	22,198	59.42%	15,064	40.32%	97	0.26%
1948	22,754	61.63%	13,352	36.17%	813	2.20%
1952	30,188	68.62%	13,729	31.21%	79	0.18%
1956	33,270	74.16%	11,592	25.84%	0	0.00%
1960	26,469	59.62%	17,899	40.32%	28	0.06%
1964	14,716	35.82%	26,332	64.10%	34	0.08%
1968	20,693	52.32%	15,820	40.00%	3,040	7.69%
1972	26,200	67.28%	12,650	32.48%	94	0.24%
1976	20,640	54.28%	17,207	45.25%	179	0.47%
1980	19,674	52.87%	14,565	39.14%	2,970	7.98%
1984	24,909	62.83%	14,638	36.92%	100	0.25%
1988	20,951	56.41%	15,966	42.99%	222	0.60%
1992	16,088	41.11%	15,099	38.58%	7,948	20.31%
1996	14,287	39.89%	16,977	47.40%	4,549	12.70%
2000	18,779	49.80%	17,424	46.21%	1,507	4.00%
2004	21,321	54.56%	17,080	43.71%	674	1.72%
2008	19,364	50.04%	18,888	48.81%	443	1.14%
2012	17,612	50.31%	16,797	47.98%	601	1.72%
2016	20,097	55.64%	13,757	38.09%	2,265	6.27%
2020	21,922	55.63%	16,636	42.21%	852	2.16%
2024	21,861	58.20%	15,572	41.46%	127	0.34%

In presidential elections, Chemung County tends to vote Republican. Only two Democrats (Lyndon B. Johnson in 1964 and Bill Clinton in 1996) have carried the county since 1920. It voted for George W. Bush in 2004 by a 10.85% margin. In 2008, the margin was much closer, but voters still gave John McCain a 1.23% win over Barack Obama. In 2012, Mitt Romney carried the county by 2.33%. In 2016, Donald Trump carried Chemung County with 55.64% of the vote compared to Hillary Clinton's 38.09%. Trump carried the county again in 2020 with over 55% of the vote.

== Education ==
Education in Chemung County is provided by various private and public institutions. High school students and adults have access to GST BOCES. BOCES provides vocation-style training in a wide range of fields as well as adult education and special education.

=== Public school districts ===
School districts with any portion of territory in the county, even if the schools and/or administrative offices are elsewhere, include:

- Corning City School District
- Elmira City School District
- Elmira Heights Central School District
- Horseheads Central School District
- Odessa-Montour Central School District
- Spencer-Van Etten Central School District
- Watkins Glen Central School District
- Waverly Central School District

=== Private schools ===
- Chemung Valley Montessori School
- Elmira Christian Academy
- Holy Family Middle School
- Saint Mary Our Mother School
- Notre Dame High School
- Twin Tiers Christian Academy

=== Higher education ===
- Arnot Ogden School of Nursing
- Corning Community College (off-campus sites)
- Elmira College
- Elmira Business Institute

=== Public libraries ===
Chemung County Library District

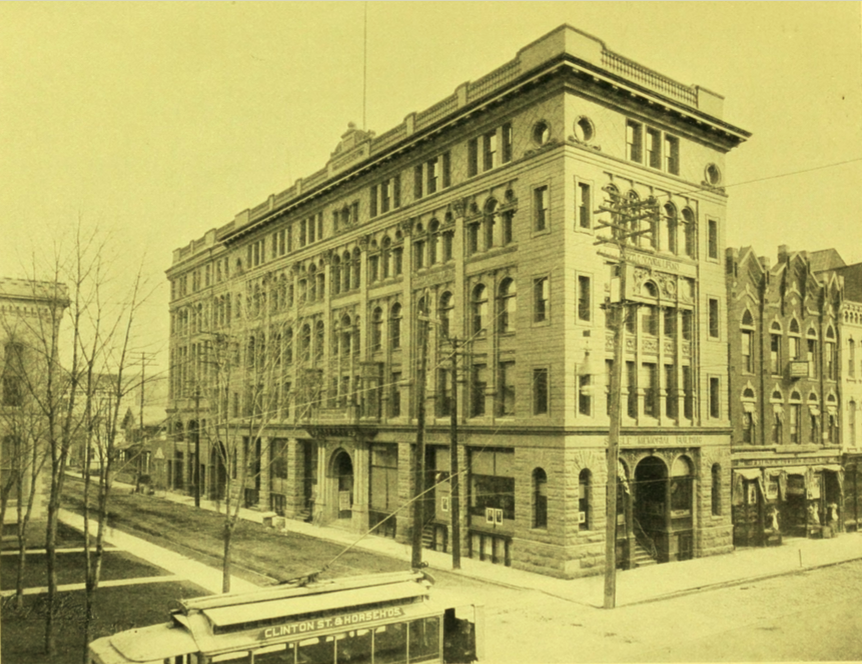
Steele Memorial Library

- Steele Memorial Library
- Horseheads Free Library
- Big Flats Library
- West Elmira Library
- Van Etten Library
- Chemung County Bookmobile

== Communities ==
=== Larger Settlements ===
#	Location	Population	Type	Area
1	†Elmira	29,200	City	Elmira-Horseheads
2	Southport	7,238	CDP	Elmira-Horseheads
3	Horseheads	6,461	Village	Elmira-Horseheads
4	Big Flats	5,277	CDP	West
5	West Elmira	4,967	CDP	Elmira-Horseheads
6	Elmira Heights	4,097	Village	Elmira-Horseheads
7	Horseheads North	2,843	CDP	North
8	Pine Valley	813	CDP	North
9	Breesport	626	CDP/Hamlet	Northeast
10	Wellsburg	580	Village	Southeast
11	††Van Etten	537	CDP/Hamlet	Northeast
12	Erin	483	CDP	Northeast
13	Millport	312	Village	North

† - County Seat

†† - Former Village

=== Towns ===
- Ashland
- Baldwin
- Big Flats
- Catlin
- Chemung
- Elmira
- Erin
- Horseheads
- Southport
- Van Etten
- Veteran

=== Hamlet ===
- Lowman

== See also ==
- List of counties in New York
- National Register of Historic Places listings in Chemung County, New York
