= Keuka College =

Private college in Keuka Park, New York, US

- Seal of Keuka College
- Former names: Keuka College and Institute (1890–1915); Keuka College for Women (1921–1985)
- Motto: Believe in What We Can Do Together
- Type: Private college
- Established: 1890; 136 years ago
- Accreditation: Middle States Commission on Higher Education
- President: Amy Storey
- Academic staff: 58 FT/ 132 PT (2024)
- Students: 1,366 (2024)
- Undergraduates: 968 (2024)
- Postgraduates: 398 (2024)
- Location: Keuka Park, New York, United States; 42°36′55″N 77°05′26″W
- Campus: 288 acres (1.17 km^{2}); Rural
- Colors: Green and Gold
- Nickname: Wolves
- Website: keuka.edu

Keuka College is a private college in Keuka Park, New York, United States, founded in 1890.

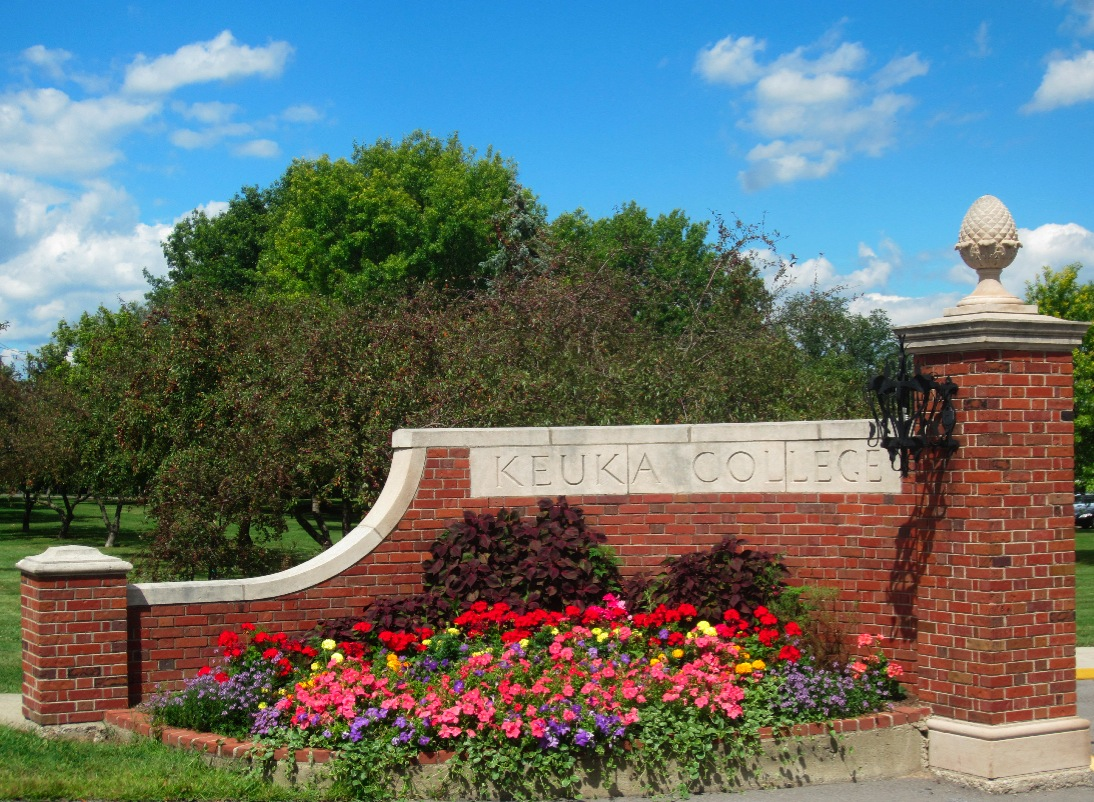
Entrance to Keuka College

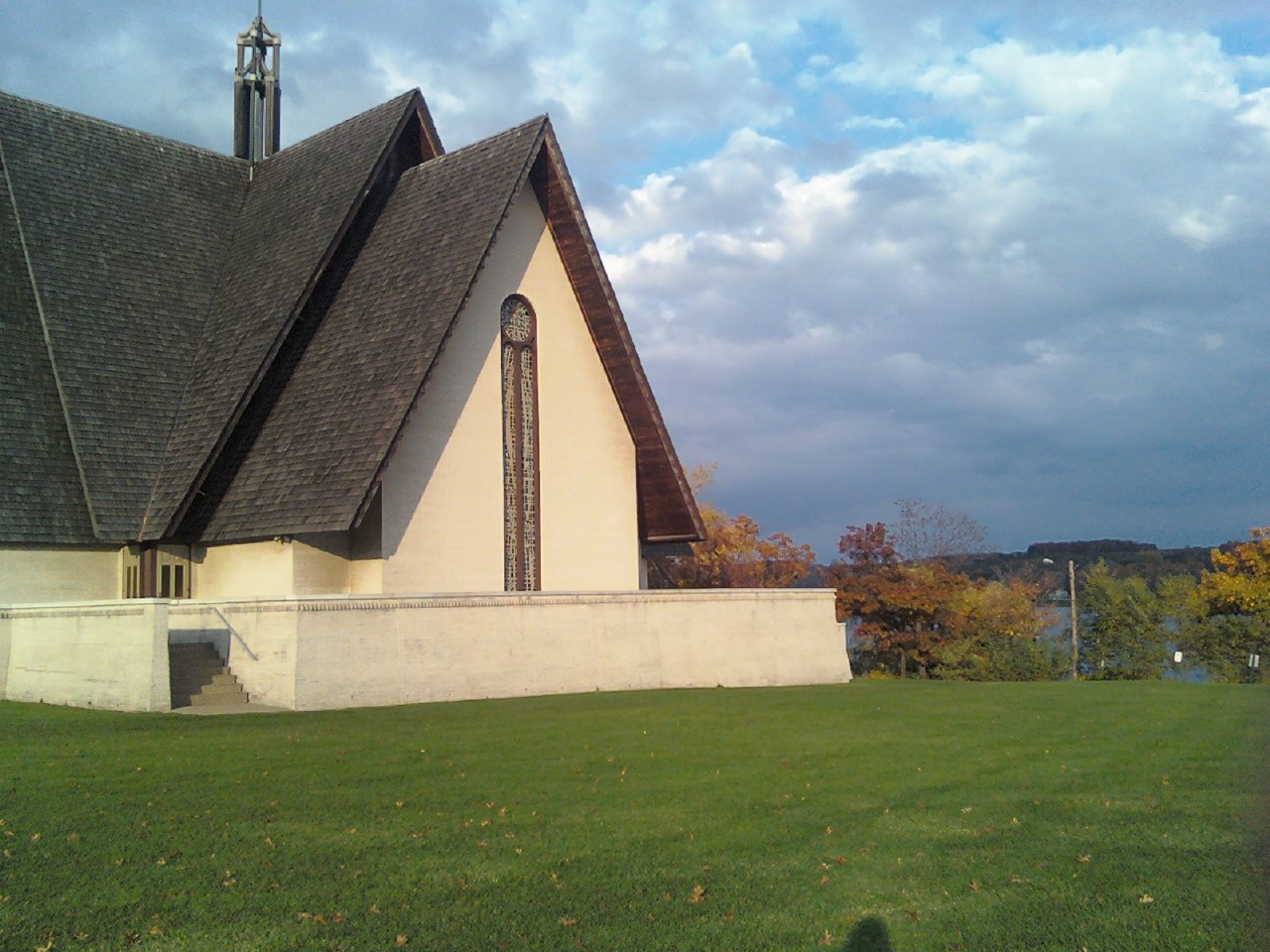
Norton Chapel, Keuka College

== History ==
Keuka College was founded in 1890 by George Harvey Ball, who envisioned a college that would provide a high-level education to all deserving students, regardless of economic background. The first academic building was dedicated on August 14, 1890. In an article published the next day, The New York Times noted that the hall was built on "one of the most beautiful locations on the Keuka Lake," and that it was "a firm-looking building, four stories in height, of brick and stone." The freshman class in Fall 1890 consisted of eighty students.

The college faced financial troubles and decided to suspend active instruction in 1915.

=== Reopening ===
In 1919, Arthur H. Norton, after whom the Norton Chapel is named, was chosen as the President of Keuka. Under Norton, who would serve as president for the next 16 years, Keuka resumed instruction in 1921 as Keuka College for Women. During this trying time, Norton personally wrote more than 3,000 letters, published and mailed at least 10,000 pamphlets, made 66 speeches, and surveyed 76 colleges in order to advance Keuka's cause. Gertrude Martin, former dean of women at Cornell University, became a Keuka trustee and advised the now women's college.

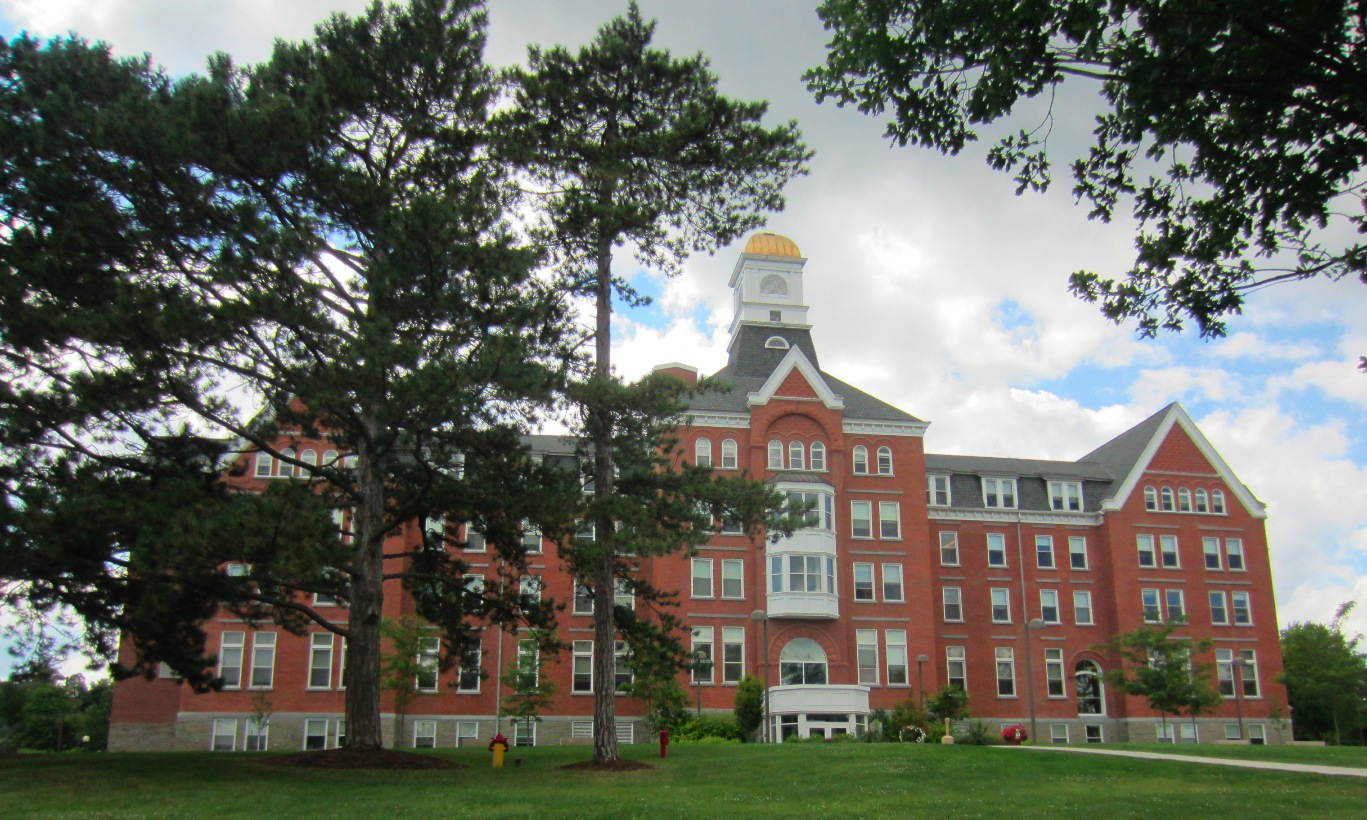
Ball Hall (Built in 1890)

The Ball brothers—founders of what would become the Ball Corporation, a S&P 500 company, and benefactors of Ball State University—were among the key supporters of Keuka at this time. Years earlier, with their father in poor health, the young Ball brothers "found a friend and confidant in their uncle," George Harvey Ball. When the Ball brothers' father, Lucius Styles Ball, died, Uncle George provided financial support and some measure of stability to the young Ball brothers. George Harvey Ball also provided his nephews with funds that helped launch their successful enterprise. The Ball brothers expressed their gratitude to their uncle by supporting Keuka College, donating land and providing funds. In recognition of this, the first academic building was renamed Ball Hall in 1921 after founder and first President George Harvey Ball and the Ball Brothers In 1924, Hegeman Hall and Richardson Hall (later renamed Harrington Hall) were built.

During World War II, Keuka College expanded its nursing program in order to provide professionally trained nurses for the war effort, due in no small part to the personal correspondence between Keuka President J. Hillis Miller and the First Lady, Eleanor Roosevelt. Keuka's emphasis on experiential learning meant that it had a nursing program combining "academic study in the classroom and clinical work at the hospital."

=== Coeducation ===
Keuka remained a women's college until 1985, when declining enrollment at that time, from 536 total students in 1979 to 407 students in 1984, caused the board of trustees to vote in favor of admitting men. Since then, enrollment has increased to over 1,200 students as of 2021.

In the late 2000s, with the help of donations from alumni and friends of the college, the original building, Ball Hall, was restored. The three-year renovation of the historical centerpiece of the campus received a Citation Award from the American Institute for Architects-Central New York (AIA CNY) in 2008.

In 2016, the Keuka Commons was dedicated. This new building houses the Division of Business and Management, the Center for Professional Studies, the Wertman Office of Digital Education, the Center for Business Analytics and Health Informatics, a state-of-the-art trading room, classrooms, study spaces, the campus bookstore, and the Wolf Den Café.

In 2021, the college was sanctioned by the American Association of University Professors "for infringement of governance standards".

== Academics ==
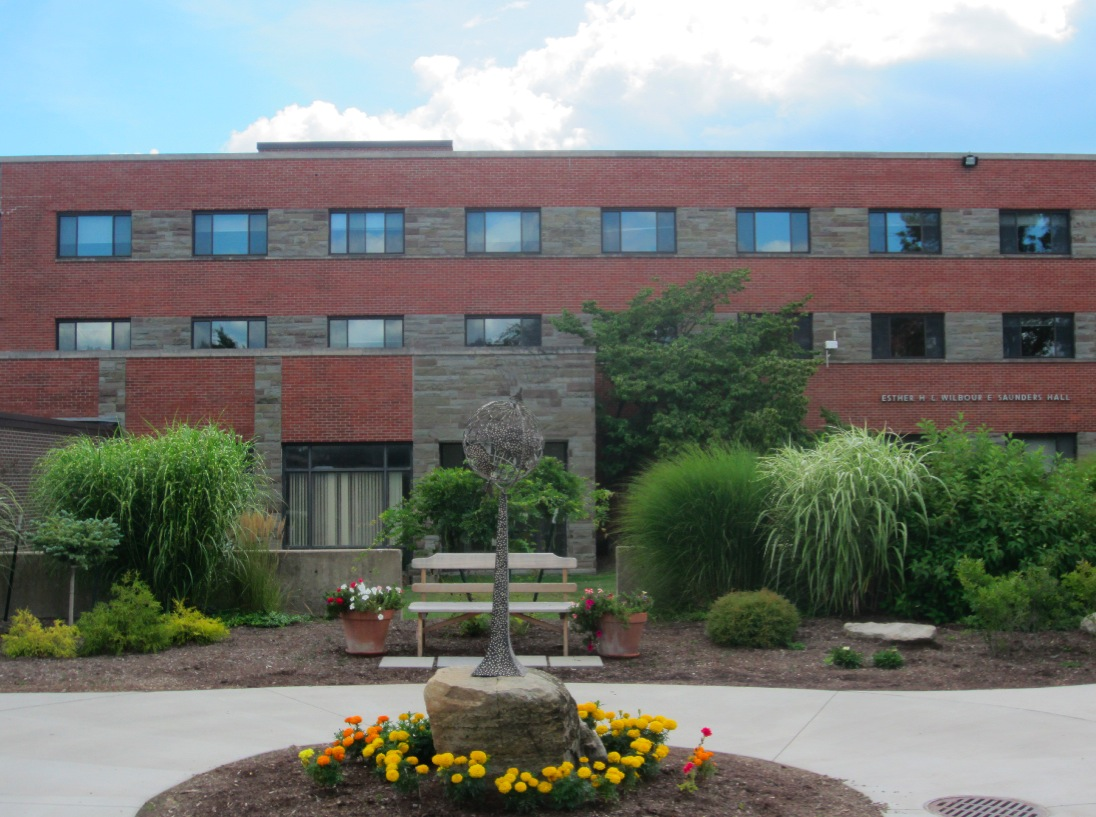
Saunders Hall

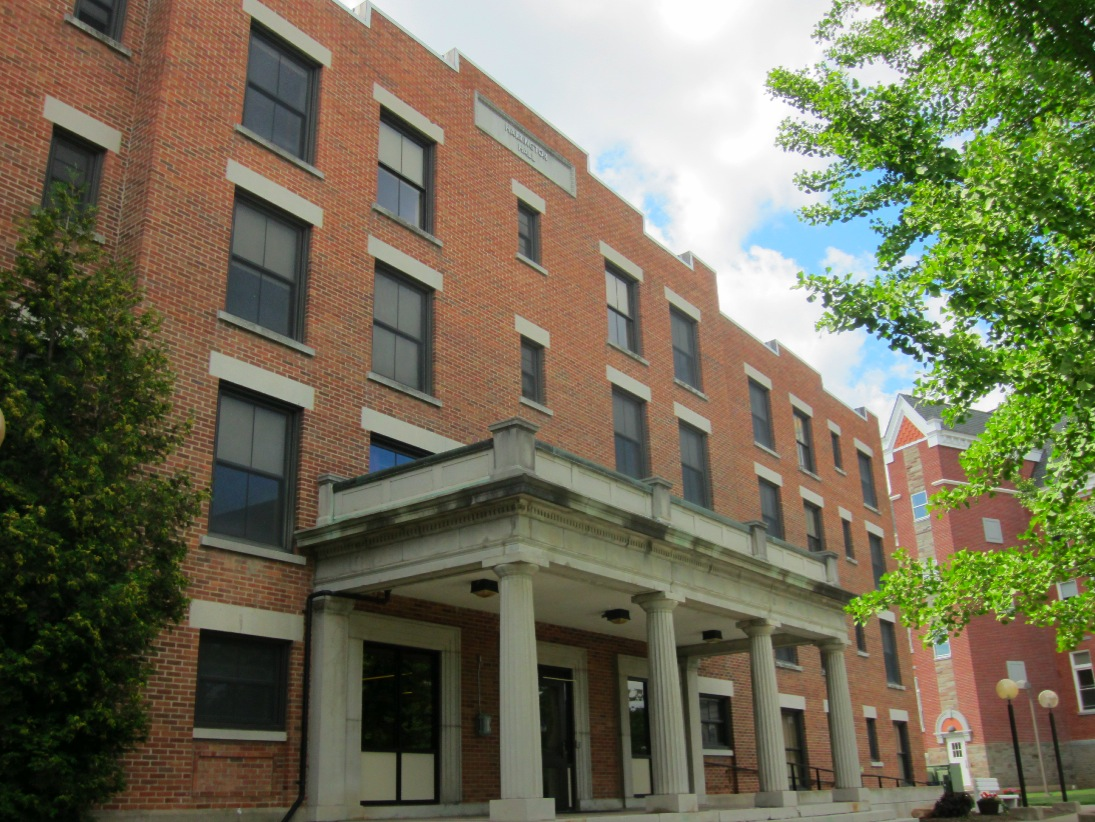
Harrington Hall (built in 1924)

Keuka College offers 29 bachelor's degree programs and 27 minors and self-designed majors. In addition, Keuka offers five master's degree programs.

Keuka has a presence in China, with around 2,200 Chinese students pursuing Keuka degrees at three partner universities, namely Yunnan University of Finance and Economics, Jimei University, and Anyang Normal University. The Keuka-China international educational partnership has the approval of the Office of Academic Degrees Committee for the State Council in China.

Additional students are completing Keuka degrees at partner universities in Vietnam, namely Vietnam National University - International School (VNU-IS) in Hanoi, and Ho Chi Minh City University of Economics and Finance.

More than 110 international students from different countries study on the home campus.

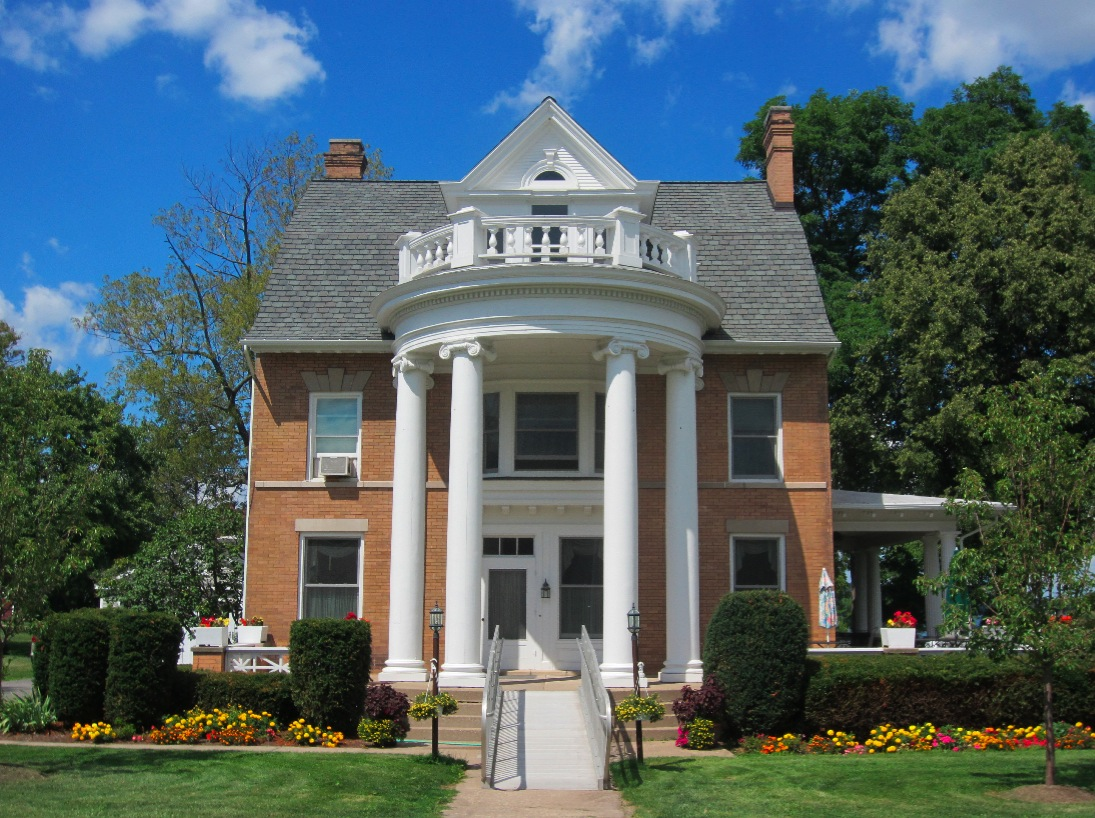
The Lucina, home to the president of Keuka College

=== Academic Success at Keuka (ASK) ===
In addition to providing services to students with disabilities, ASK is also available to help all students enhance study skills, improve time management, and earn better grades through peer and professional tutoring in writing and other subjects.

=== Adult education ===
The Keuka College Center for Professional Studies Accelerated Studies for Adults Program (ASAP) offers degree completion and master's programs for working students. Classes are held one evening a week at community college and hospital locations throughout Upstate New York, including Syracuse, Auburn, Corning, Rochester, and other locations. Bachelor's degrees can be earned in management, criminal justice, nursing for RNs, and social work. Master's degrees are available in criminal justice administration, management, and nursing.

Keuka's Accelerated Studies for Adults Program (ASAP) offers degree completion at more than 20 sites throughout Upstate New York, as well as through online courses. Keuka has partnered with universities in China and Vietnam, with more than 3,000 students pursuing Keuka degrees.

=== Center for Aquatic Research (CAR) ===
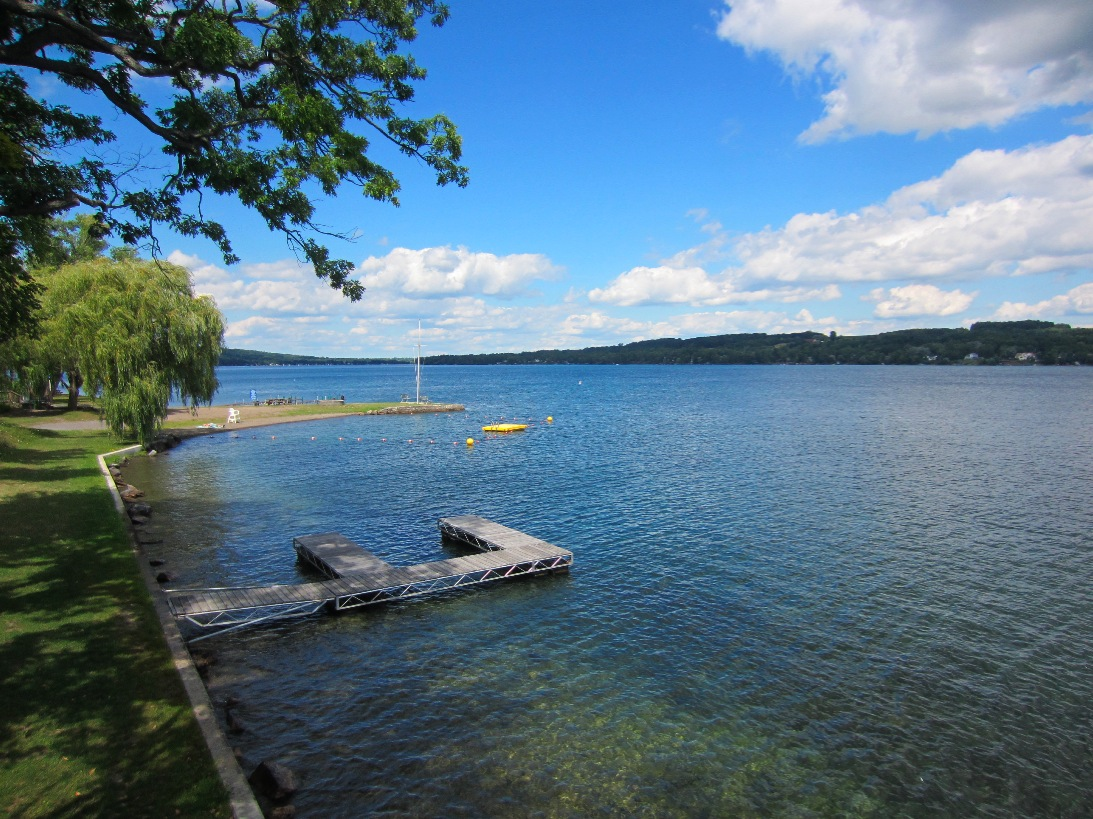
Point Neamo and the Keuka Lake front from the college

The Center capitalizes on Keuka College's excellent location on the shore of Keuka Lake and engages in research, teaching, and outreach. Research has been conducted on the ecological impacts from deep chlorophyll layers (DCL) in Keuka Lake. CAR researchers have worked with researchers from Cornell University, Hobart and William Smith Colleges, and Finger Lakes Community College and other institutions on a state-funded project that investigates water quality issues on Owasco Lake. CAR researchers have also presented their findings at regional and national scientific conferences. In addition, the center hosts summer workshops for area high school science teachers as well as people interested in the aquatic ecology of Keuka Lake and of the larger Finger Lakes region. CAR has had an international aquatic research partnership with Wenzhou University on the east coast of China.

=== Center for Experiential Learning ===
The Center for Experiential Learning serves as a bridge, connecting internships, the classroom and co-curricular activities, into a mutually reinforcing learning network. Interns have worked in local and out-of-state hospitals, schools, day care centers, set up Web sites for nonprofit groups, connecting lessons in video art with the digital nuts and bolts of the workplace; accounting majors have helped with auditing at major companies, including KPMG, one of the "Big Four" auditors in the world. Experiential Learning is the central focus of the student experience, which gives students the Keuka advantage, namely, real-world experience for the 21st century, enabling them to build up ties, skill sets, and experiences even before they graduate and enter the world force or graduate or professional programs. Experiential learning at Keuka occurs in the classroom, co-curricular activities, the workplace, and the community. It is integrated and weaves throughout the four years, and begins day one.

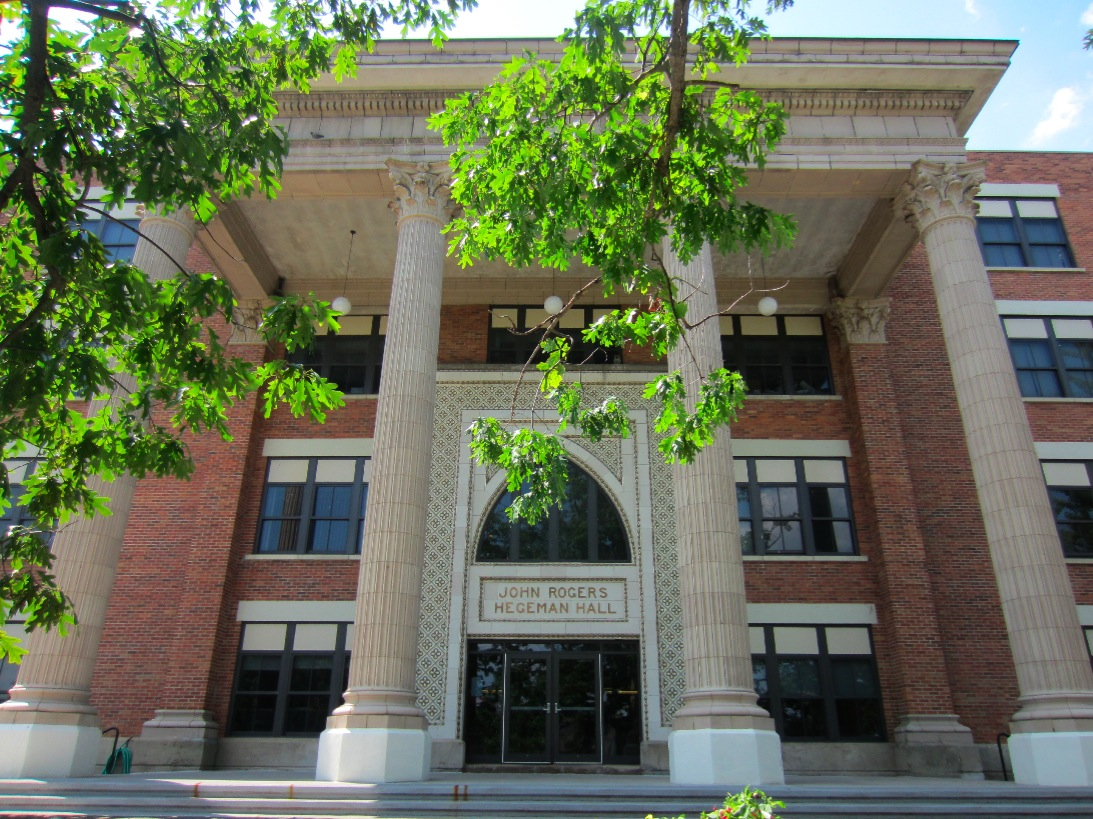
Hegeman Hall (Built in 1924)

==== Field Period ====
In 1942, Edith Estey, a 1933 Keuka graduate and administrator, created the Field Period program, which continues to be a major component of a Keuka College education as administered through the Center for Experiential Learning. During a Field Period, each Keuka student is required to spend 140 hours per year or approximately one month in a self-directed learning experience. This can involve a work internship, a community service project, spiritual exploration, personal development, cross-cultural diversity exploration, or a group cultural experience to another city or country.

The student is graded on a pass and fail basis with the potential to earn three credits. The Field Period can be completed over summer break or winter break, as students have the month of January off. Students design a learning contract with the site of their choice that outlines learning goals and objectives that must be met. Each student's site supervisor evaluates the student's work ethic and progress and reports back to Keuka College's Experiential Learning office. Upon completion, students meet with their academic advisors to present unique documentation of the experience and hand in a recap paper and reflective journal.

=== Center for Global Education ===
The Center serves Keuka students on the Keuka Lake home campus who look for opportunities to study abroad, or for information about the college's many international ties. It also serves international students looking to study at Keuka College in the United States, and Keuka China or Keuka Vietnam students interested in Keuka College's exchange programs.

=== Lightner Library and the Aben and Lightner Art Galleries ===
The Lightner Library houses books, journals, computer labs, and electronic resources. It is also home to two art galleries. The Robert S. & Rebecca Bannan Aben Gallery features the work of world-renowned artist Yankel Ginzburg. The Ginzburg art was donated to the college by the Aben Family. The Lightner Art Gallery has showcased the works of local and regional artists, as well as those of Keuka students, on a rotating, monthly basis for the past 25 years.

== Athletics ==
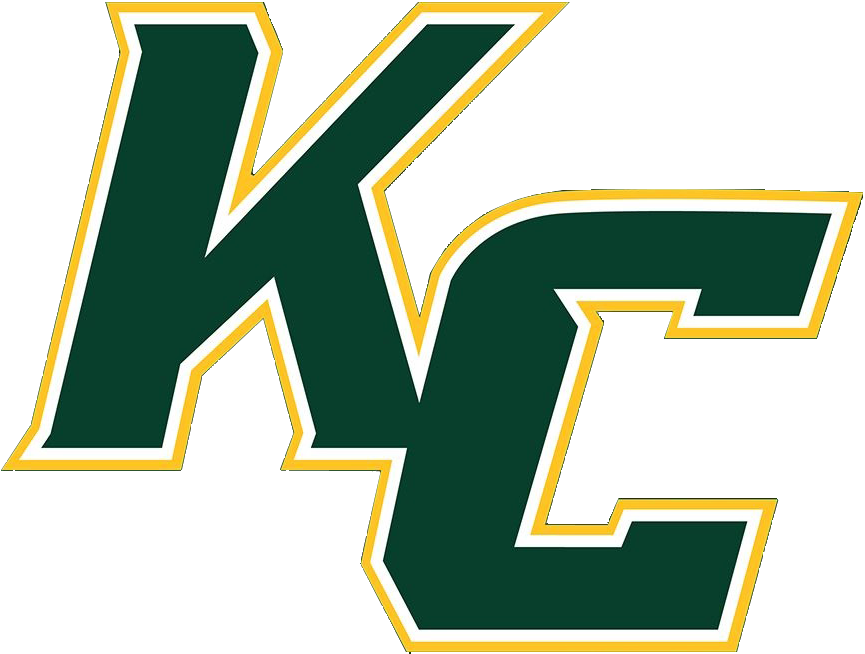
Keuka athletics mark

Keuka College teams participate as a member of the National Collegiate Athletic Association's Division III. They are a member of the Empire 8 Conference and of the Eastern College Athletic Conference (ECAC). They formerly competed as a member of the North Eastern Athletic Conference (NEAC), now known as the United East Conference. Men's sports include baseball, basketball, cross country, golf, lacrosse, soccer, tennis and volleyball; while women's sports include basketball, cross country, golf, lacrosse, soccer, softball, tennis, field hockey and volleyball.

They were known as the Storm until 2014, and then adopted the nickname the "Wolfpack". Following the 2016 threat of a lawsuit by North Carolina State University, Keuka College decided to forego litigation and discontinue the "Wolfpack" name, renaming themselves the "Wolves."
