= The Bluff Point Stoneworks =

Prehistoric structure in the town of Jerusalem, New York

Coordinates: 42°33′45″N 77°07′27″W

The Bluff Point Stoneworks are a prehistoric structure located in the town of Jerusalem, New York, between the arms of Keuka Lake in the Finger Lakes region of western New York State. Though they were studied many times throughout the 20th century, the structure has been mostly destroyed, and it is still uncertain who built the structure.

Most who researched the Stoneworks were amateurs, not professional archaeologists; as a result, their conclusions led to an even greater uncertainty as to the nature of the structure.

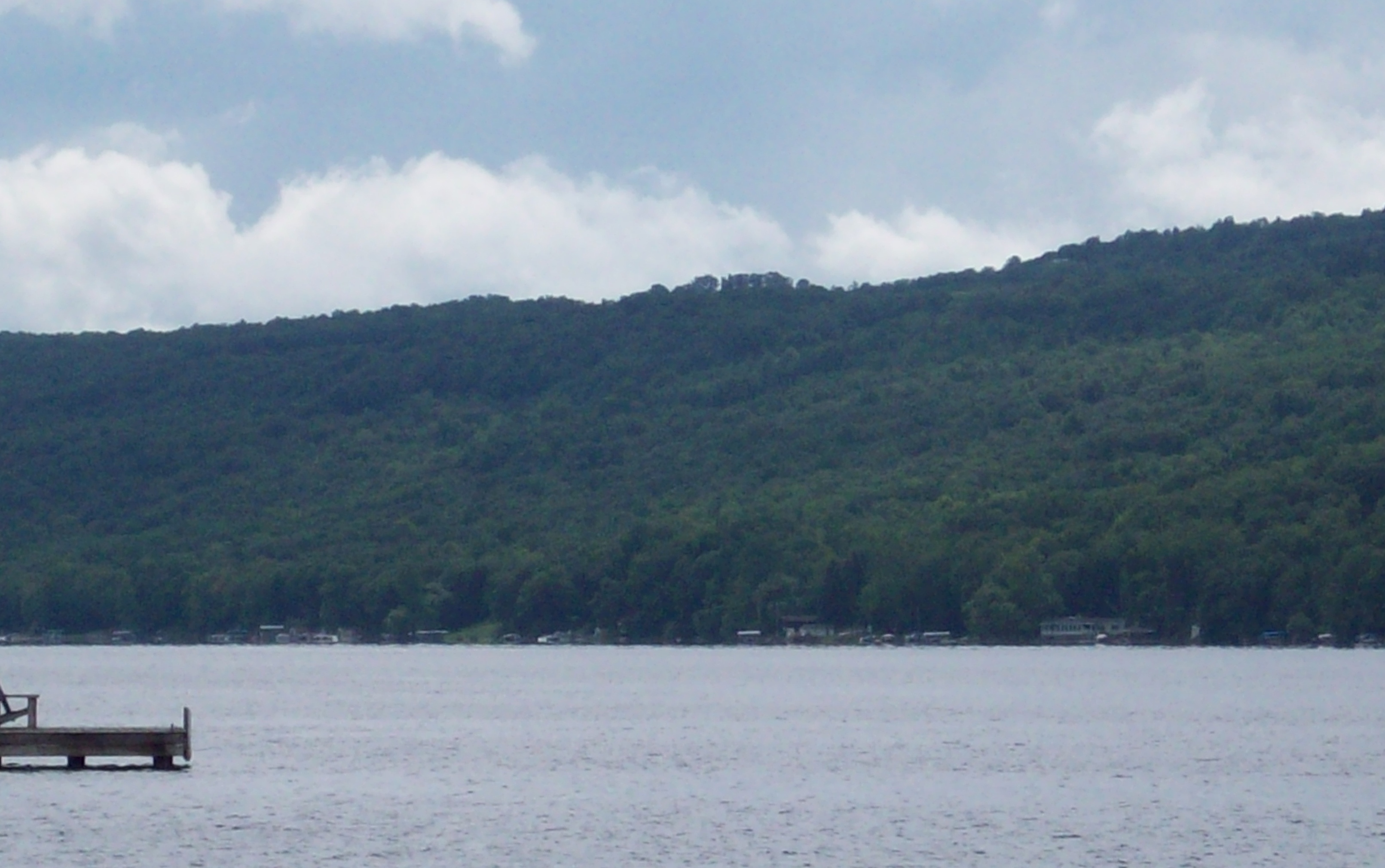
Bluff Point on Keuka Lake

== S. Hart Wright ==
S. Hart Wright, in "The Aboriginal work on Bluff Point, Yates County, N.Y." - included in the 35th Annual Report of the New York State Museum of Natural History - described the Stoneworks as he saw them in 1879 and 1880. They were located on 7 acres (28,000 m^{2}) of land, he said, from the top of the bluff point ridge westward. Wright described "Graded Ways", three to eight feet wide and one foot high. He went on to state that the "rectilinear divisions...are made with almost mathematical accuracy, and indicate a skill we can hardly attribute to the red man." He later admitted that the structure "may belong to the age of the mound-builders." Summing up, S. Hart Wright stated that the Stoneworks were "one of the strangest structures in the state. I find nothing similar to it figured in any work on archaeology."

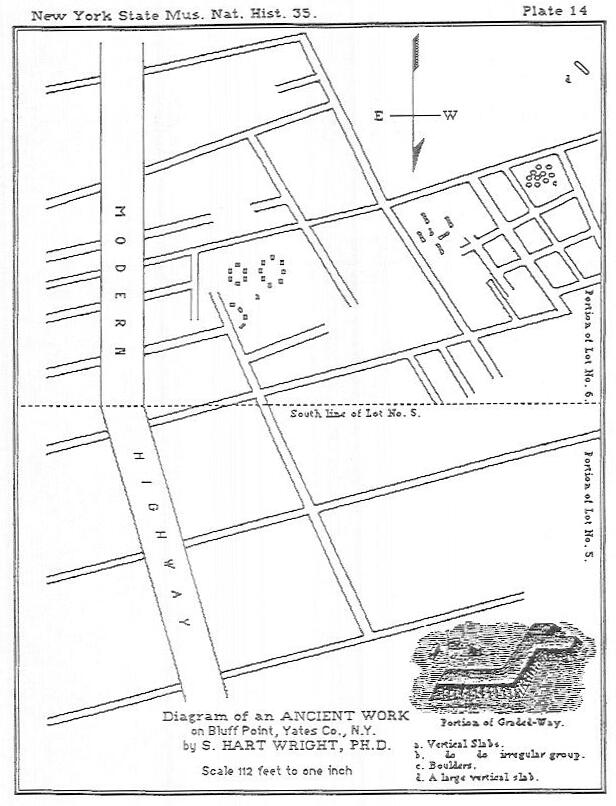
S. Hart Wright's drawing of the Stoneworks

== Who built the Stoneworks? ==
A Democrat and Chronicle article on Sunday, 31 July 1966, written by Daniel C. Riker, was titled "Did Norse Explore Lakes Before Columbus?" Riker tells of an Haudenosaunee legend of a "great canoe, manned by men with flowing hair, and carrying shining shields on its side." Indeed, the Seneca Indians who lived on the land had many legends, such as "stone men" and "dark people", but Riker claims that their legend of these Norse-sounding men is evidence that the Stoneworks were built by these Nordic visitors.

Another newspaper article, "Sees Norsemen Early Dwellers In This Country", states that Norse records indicate that in 1347 there were several expeditions to a new land in the West.

Yet another article claims that the engravings at the Stoneworks of "human and animal heads are arranged in amazing patterns" that were similar to those made by the Etruscans. A different article indicated that an engraving of the face of a veiled woman, like Isis, may have appeared on the rocks.

In The Crooked Lake Review # 68, November 1993, David D. Robinson argues that the Hopewells who used to live in Western New York were too primitive to build a structure like the Stoneworks.

Eric Buetens wrote an article in the Summer of 1980 which claimed that the Celts built similar structures that were used for archeo-astronomy or as a signal beacon.

A. Glen Rogers wrote a book titled Forgotten Stories of the Finger Lakes in which he stated that the layout of the Stoneworks were not suitable for a fort. He suggests that Jesuits might have built the Stoneworks, but admits that this is inconsistent with the fact that the Jesuits tended to keep very detailed written records.

== Ownership of the land ==
Christopher A. Wright wrote "The Bluff Point Stoneworks" for the Yates County Historical Society in April 1980.

He described how in 1876, Howland Hemphill owned a farm upon which the Stoneworks were later discovered. John Finch had originally purchased the main lot (lot 6) in 1813, and sold it to Hemphill in 1830. Hemphill removed many of the stones in order to build his own home, as well as "the Wagener house at the end of the Point."

Though most of the structure had disappeared by 1980, Christopher Wright illustrated that "some of the excavation pits [from the 1940 dig by Gilbert Brewer] are still visible from Skyline Drive, in a thicket of deer brush and poplar."

By 1985, the remnants of the Stoneworks were obliterated by "vineyards, drainage ditches, hay fields, farm work roads, and a pine plantation."(David D. Robinson, The Crooked Lake Review, #68, Nov. 1993, 17.) The remnants of the Stoneworks, some of which may exist underground, are located about four miles (6 km) south of Keuka Park, just off Route 54-A.

== David B. Kelley and Virginia Gibbs ==
Kelley, who held a Ph.D. in Linguistics, teamed up with Gibbs, the Yates County historian, to write "Ancient Earth & Stone Ruins in Yates County, New York", published in Hamatsu, Japan on 9 April 1991. Though they described other stone ruins around the county - in Jerusalem, Middlesex, Milo, and Italy - their main focus was on the Stoneworks at Bluff Point. Because the Stoneworks were almost entirely vanished by the 1990s Kelley and Gibbs summarized the work of other scholars. Quoting S. Hart Wright's 1879-80 work, they, too, described "graded ways...bordered by large flat stones edgeways leaning toward the center of the ways; compartments or rooms which varied in dimensions; rectilinear division of structure into units, some of which exceeded 500 feet (150 m) in length; upright stone slabs arranged in circles, squares, and arcs; and eight-foot-high monolith; depressions which indicated possible roof portholes."

== Attempts at preservation ==
At present, the Stoneworks are completely nonexistent. Occasionally a group of amateur archaeologists travels to Bluff Point in order to attempt another excavation.

Berlin Hart Wright, writing in 1938, complained, "We surveyed the ruin and, at that time, an earnest plea was made to State authorities for the preservation of this unique remnant of a great aboriginal structure. However, nothing came of it and today all is gone."
