= Keuka Inlet =

Location
- Country: United States
- State: New York

Physical characteristics
- Mouth: Keuka Lake
  - location: Hammondsport, New York, United States
  - coordinates: 42°24′22″N 77°13′08″W
- Basin size: 25 mi^{2} (65 km^{2})

Keuka Inlet is a river located in Steuben County, New York. It flows into Keuka Lake by Hammondsport, New York.
