= Glen Brook (Keuka Lake) =

Location
- Country: United States
- State: New York

Physical characteristics
- Mouth: Keuka Lake
  - location: Hammondsport, New York, United States
  - coordinates: 42°24′40″N 77°13′02″W
- Basin size: 5.42 mi^{2} (14.0 km^{2})

Glen Brook is a river located in Steuben County, New York. It flows into Keuka Lake by Hammondsport, New York.
