= Wagener Glen Creek =

Location
- Country: United States
- State: New York

Physical characteristics
- Mouth: Keuka Lake
  - location: Pulteney, New York, United States
  - coordinates: 42°31′51″N 77°09′10″W
- Basin size: 4.09 sq mi (10.6 km^{2})

Wagener Glen Creek is a river located in Steuben County, New York. It flows into Keuka Lake by Pulteney, New York.
