= The Lake Gun =

Short story by James Fenimore Cooper

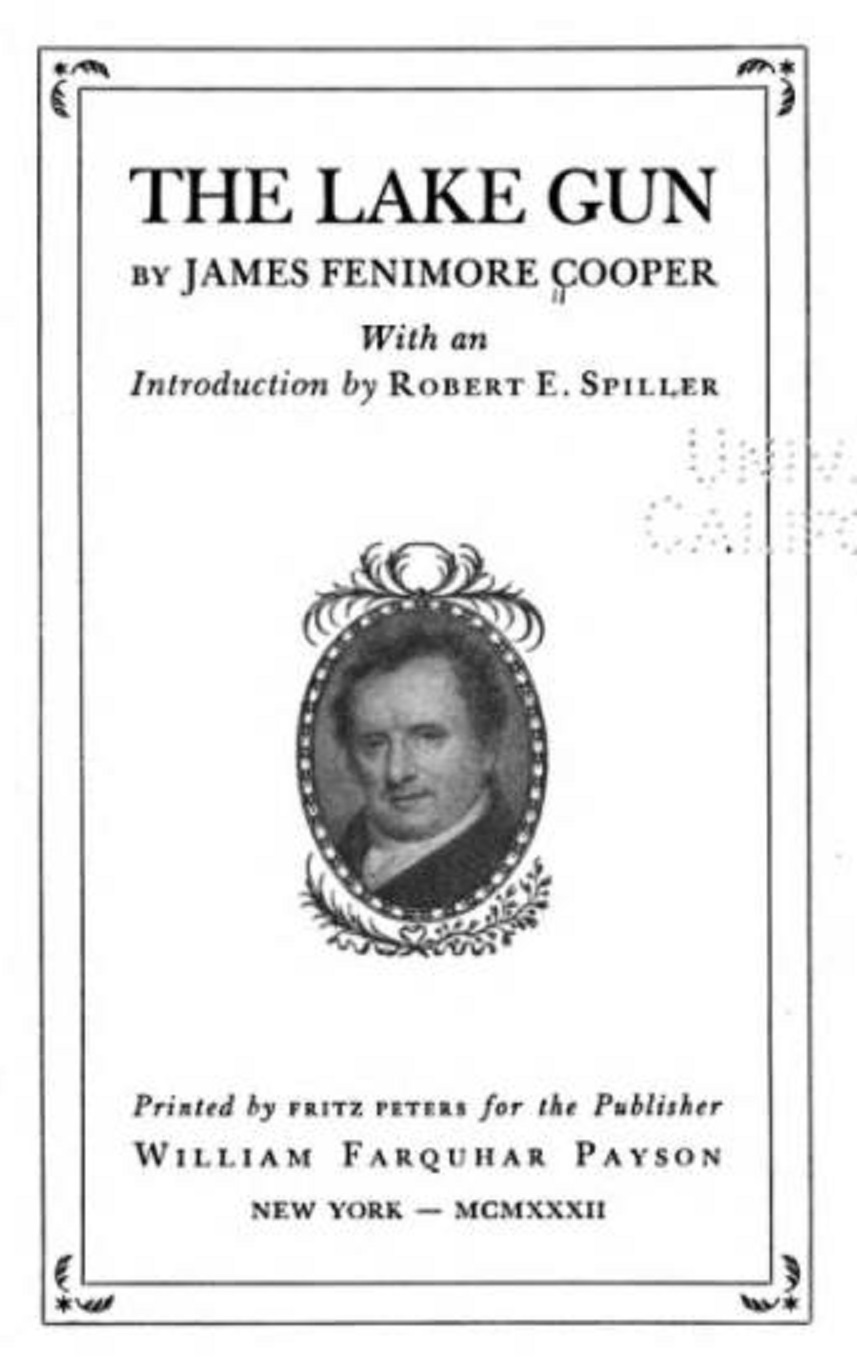
1932 reprint by William Farquhar Payson, New York.

"The Lake Gun" is a satirical short story by James Fenimore Cooper first published in 1850. The short story was commissioned by George E. Wood for $100, and published in a miscellany titled The Parthenon. It was reprinted in Specimens of American Literature in New York in 1866. The short story satirizes political demagoguery, focused on William Henry Seward.

The story was reprinted in 1932 by publisher William Farquhar Payson in a limited edition with illustrations.

The title of the story comes from a mysterious loud exploding sound coming from Seneca Lake, called "The Lake Gun" by European American settlers to the area, and known today as the Seneca Guns. These sounds remain unexplained to this day, with no clear or agreed-upon cause.

== Plot summary ==
The story takes place on Seneca Lake in Central New York in the early nineteenth century. On Seneca Lake could be heard loud explosions which observers labeled "The Lake Gun." The source is unknown but the Native Americans consider it the voice of the Manitou, their god. There is also the "Wandering Jew," a tree trunk that floats on the lake blown by winds and currents.

Fuller, a traveler to the Finger Lakes, after hearing accounts of the "lake gun" and the "Wandering Jew", hires a boat with which he explores the mysteries accompanied by Peter.

Fuller notices an Iroquois of the Seneca tribe gazing at the lake one morning. He is college-educated. Wearing buckskin leggings and a blanket, he has returned to visit his ancestral home. He looks at the Swimming Seneca, the "Wandering Jew". They hear the "lake gun" sound. The Iroquois explains their origin.

There was once a demagogue, a chief, See-wise, who did not follow the traditions of the Seneca as established by the Great Spirit, Manitou. He decided that fishing could be done whenever people wanted. This went against the dictates of Manitou. But he was able to get youthful supporters for his cause. He then disappeared without a trace.

He was changed into a trunk of a tree floating in the lake according to the account. He would float for a thousand years. When he dived to fish, Manitou would warn him to stop, which was the "lake gun" explosion heard.

The Iroquois explains the lasting impression made upon him by the legend: "I cannot say. The things learned in childhood remain the longest on the memory. They make the deepest marks. I have seen the evil that a demagogue can do among the pale-faces; why should I not believe the same among my own people!"

When Peter sails close to the trunk, he points out its appearance, a shape that resembles a human face. It appears like a retreating forehead and a hatchet-shaped face. These are features that mimic William Henry Seward's appearance as noted by Robert E. Spiller.

The story concludes with a warning against demagoguery: "The man or the people that trust in God will find a lake for every See-wise"

== 1932 republication ==
The story was republished in 1932 as a limited edition stand-alone book by publisher William Farquhar Payson with an introduction by Robert E. Spiller. This edition was printed by Fritz Peters and contained illustrations.
