= Seneca Lake (New York) =

Lake in New York, United States of America

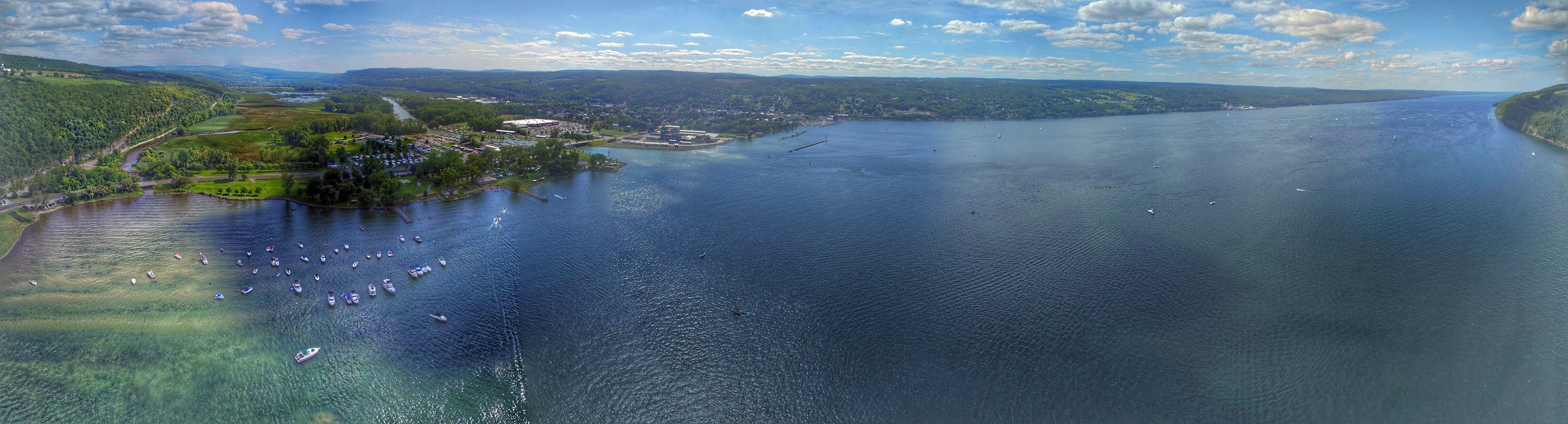
- Aerial view from the southern part of Seneca Lake.

- Location within New York Seneca Lake (the United States)
- Location: Schuyler, Seneca, Yates, and Ontario counties, New York, United States
- Group: Finger Lakes
- Coordinates: 42°39′20″N 76°53′51″W
- Type: Ground moraine
- Primary inflows: Catharine Creek, Keuka Lake Outlet, underwater sources
- Primary outflows: Seneca River/ Cayuga-Seneca Canal
- Basin countries: United States
- Max. length: 38 mi (61 km)
- Surface area: 66.9 mi^{2} (173 km^{2})
- Average depth: 292 ft (89 m)
- Max. depth: 618 ft (188 m)
- Water volume: 3.81 cu mi (15.9 km^{3})
- Shore length^{1}: 75.4 miles (121.3 km)
- Surface elevation: 446 ft (136 m)
- Settlements: Watkins Glen, Geneva
- ^{1} Shore length is not a well-defined measure.

The eleven Finger Lakes of New York State.

Seneca Lake is a Finger Lake in central New York state. Spanning four counties—Schuyler, Seneca, Yates, and Ontario—it is the largest of the eleven lake glacial chain, and the deepest glacial lake entirely within the state.

Seneca Lake is 38 miles (61 km) long, has a surface area of 66.9 square miles (173 km^{2}), a maximum depth of over 618 feet (188 m), and holds the most water of all the Finger Lakes (estimated at 3.81 cubic miles (15.9 km^{3}), roughly half that of the entire chain).

Seneca is celebrated as the lake trout capital of the world and hosts the National Lake Trout Derby. Its significant depth and accessibility enable the US Navy to conduct testing and evaluation of range on equipment such as sonar.

The lake takes its name from the Seneca people, who inhabited the land until driven off it by westward colonial expansion. At the north end is the city of Geneva, home of Hobart and William Smith Colleges and the New York State Agricultural Experiment Station, a division of Cornell University. At the south end of the lake is the village of Watkins Glen, famed for auto racing (hosting Watkins Glen International racetrack) and waterfalls.

Seneca Lake's macroclimate makes it home to over 50 wineries, many of them farm wineries, and is the location of the Seneca Lake AVA and the Seneca Lake wine trail.

== Description ==
At 38 miles (61 km) long, it is the second longest of the Finger Lakes and has the largest volume, estimated at 3.81 cubic miles (15.9 km^{3}), roughly half of the water in all the Finger Lakes. It has an average depth of 291 feet (89 m), a maximum depth of 618 feet (188 m), and a surface area of 66.9 square miles (173 km^{2}).

Seneca's two main inlets are Catharine Creek at the southern end and the Keuka Lake Outlet. Seneca Lake drains into the Seneca River/ Cayuga-Seneca Canal, which joins Seneca and Cayuga Lakes at their northern ends.

It is fed by underground springs and replenished at a rate of 328,000 US gal (1,240 m^{3}) per minute. These springs keep the water moving in a circular motion, giving it little chance to freeze over. Because of Seneca Lake's great depth temperature near the bottom remains a near-constant 39 °F (4 °C).

== Ecology ==
Seneca lake has a typical aquatic population for large deep lakes in the northeast, with coldwater fish such as lake trout and Landlocked Atlantic salmon inhabiting the deeper waters, and warmwater fish such as smallmouth bass and yellow perch inhabiting shallower areas. The lake is also home to a robust population of "sawbellies," the local term for alewife shad.

== History ==
Looking south on Seneca Lake in the city of Geneva, New York

Seneca Lake was formed at least two million years ago by glacial carving of streams and valleys. Originally it was a part of a series of rivers that flowed northward. Around this time many continental glaciers moved into the area and started the Pleistocene glaciation also known as the Ice Age. It is presumed that the Finger Lakes were created by many advances and retreats of massive glaciers that were up to 2 miles (3 km) thick.

Over 200 years ago, there were Iroquois villages on Seneca Lake's surrounding hillsides. During the American Revolutionary War, their villages, including Kanadaseaga ("Seneca Castle"), were wiped out during the 1779 Sullivan Expedition.

After the war, the Iroquois were forced to cede their land when Britain was defeated. Their millions of acres were sold and some lands in this area were granted to veterans of the army in payment for their military service. A slow stream of European-American settlers began to arrive circa 1790. Initially the settlers were without a market nearby or a way to get their crops to market. The settlers' isolation ended in 1825 with the opening of the Erie Canal.

The canal linked the Finger Lakes Region to the outside world. Steamships, barges and ferries quickly plied the lake. The earlier, short Crooked Lake Canal linked Seneca Lake to Keuka Lake.

Numerous canal barges sank during operations and rest on the bottom of the lake. A collection of barges at the southwest end of the lake, near the village of Watkins Glen, are being preserved and made accessible for scuba diving by the Finger Lakes Underwater Preserve Association.

== Recreation ==
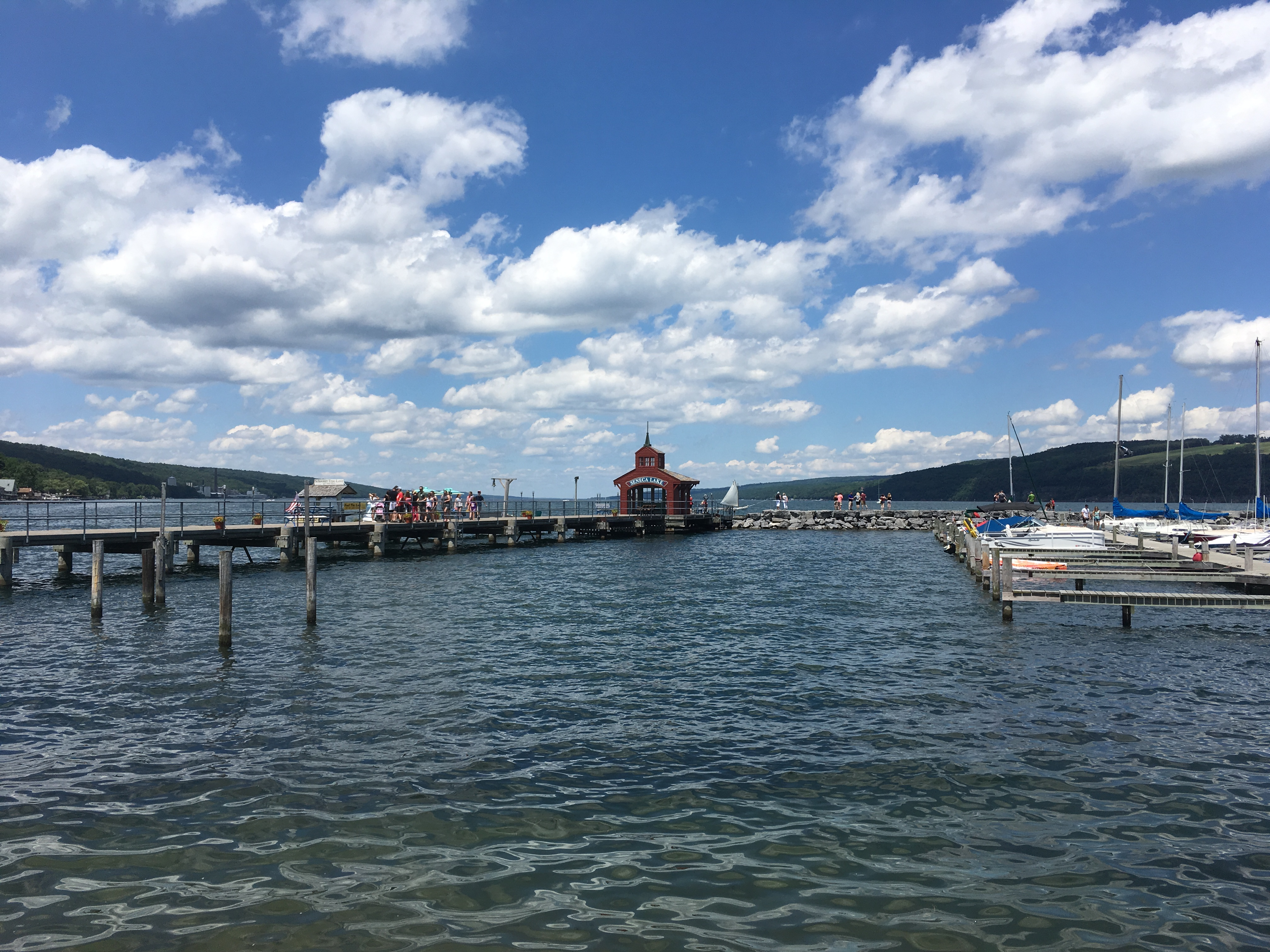
Seneca Lake from Watkins Glen

=== Fishing ===
The lake is a popular fishing destination. Fish species in the lake include lake trout, rainbow trout, brown trout, landlocked salmon, largemouth bass, smallmouth bass, northern pike, pickerel, and yellow perch.

== Folklore ==
=== Sea serpent ===
In July 1900, newspaper reports carried reports that on the evening of 14 July 1899, the steamboat Otetiani, carrying several dozen passengers, encountered a 25-foot-long sea monster with "two rows of sharp, white teeth." The steamer is said to have given chase to the creature and deliberately rammed it at full speed. The creature was struck by the ship's paddle wheel midway between head and tail, it spine broken. It raised its four-foot-long head, then gave a gasp as it died. The ship attempted to rope the monster and tow it back to shore, but it sank to the bottom of Seneca Lake. A report sometime later in the Geneva Gazette suggested that the incident was a hoax.

=== Painted rocks ===
Highly visible painted rocks located at the southern end of the lake on the eastern cliff face depicting an American flag, teepee, and several Native Americans painted in 1929 during the Sullivan Sesquicentennial, celebrating the 150th anniversary of the Sullivan Expedition that drove Native Americans off their land. They contain the errors that peoples in the Seneca Region used longhouses and not tee-pees, and is unfurled to the left, which is never portrayed that way for exhibition.

Some older paintings located on the bottom of the cliff were done somewhat earlier, for tourists on Seneca Lake boat tours, who were given the mythology that they had been done in 1779 after the Senecas escaped from the Sullivan Campaign. Historian Barbara Bell, has cleared this up in her 2005 book.

=== Unexplained booms (Seneca Drums) ===
Seneca Lake is known for occasional unexplained booming sounds, sometimes accompanied by vibrations, which have been reported around the lake for more than a century. The phenomenon is commonly known as the Seneca Drums, Seneca Guns, or Lake Guns. Similar unexplained booming sounds elsewhere in the eastern United States are also sometimes referred to as Seneca Guns. They are an example of a wider class of unexplained sounds sometimes described as skyquakes. The term lake guns was used by James Fenimore Cooper in his 1850 short story "The Lake Gun", which described the phenomenon on Seneca Lake. He characterized the sound as resembling the distant discharge of heavy artillery Reports of similar sounds in the area predate Cooper's account.

Natural gas escaping from beneath the lake has long been proposed as one explanation. In 1934, geologist Herman L. Fairchild of the University of Rochester proposed that natural gas escaping from gas-bearing rock beneath Seneca Lake could rise through the lake sediments and water and produce the booming sounds at the surface. The hypothesis was debated at the time and was not conclusively demonstrated.

Modern surveys have renewed interest in a possible connection with subsurface gas. A high-resolution bathymetric survey identified 144 large pockmarks on the southern lake floor, some up to about 300 metres (1,000 ft) across and 60 feet (18 m) deep. New York State researchers have suggested that some may have been produced by methane or other fluids migrating upward through the lake sediments.

In 2025, researchers from Cornell University, the State University of New York College of Environmental Science and Forestry, and the New York State Department of Environmental Conservation sampled water within and outside the pockmarks. Methane was detected, but concentrations were similar inside and outside the pockmarks, indicating that they are not continuously releasing methane. Researchers have proposed that gas could instead accumulate beneath the sediments and be released episodically. Because a gas bubble rising from the deepest part of the lake could expand by roughly forty times before reaching the surface, large releases have been proposed as a possible explanation for the Seneca Drums. The connection has not been demonstrated, however, and research into the origin of the sounds is continuing.

== Sampson Navy and Air Force bases ==
The east side of Seneca Lake was once home to Sampson Naval Base, a military training ground primarily used during World War II. It became Sampson Air Force Base during the Korean War and was used for basic training. After Sampson AFB closed, the airfield remained as Seneca Army Airfield until closed in 2000. The training grounds of Sampson have since been converted to a civilian picnic area called Sampson State Park.

The Naval Undersea Warfare Center (NUWC) Sonar test facility is a US Navy facility on the west side of the lake. A scale model of the sonar section of the nuclear submarine USS Seawolf (SSN 21) was tested during the ship's development, leading to its launch in June 1995.

== Water quality ==
There is a YSI EMM-2500 Buoy Platform located in the north end of Seneca Lake roughly in the center. Its coordinates are: latitude: 42°41'49.99"N, longitude: 76°55'29.93"W. The buoy has cellular modem communications and measures wind speed and direction, relative humidity, air temperature, barometric pressure, light intensity, and the water's depth and temperature, conductivity, turbidity, and chlorophyll-a levels.

The buoy was initially deployed in June 2006. The water depth where it is located is about 200 feet (60 m).

On June 30, 2022, the New York State Department of Environmental Conservation denied a request for an air permit for a natural gas power plant owned by Greenidge Generation, a bitcoin mining company, on the lake used for powering an 8,000-machine operation which the company argued had no legal basis and would challenge in court in a press statement.

== Wine ==
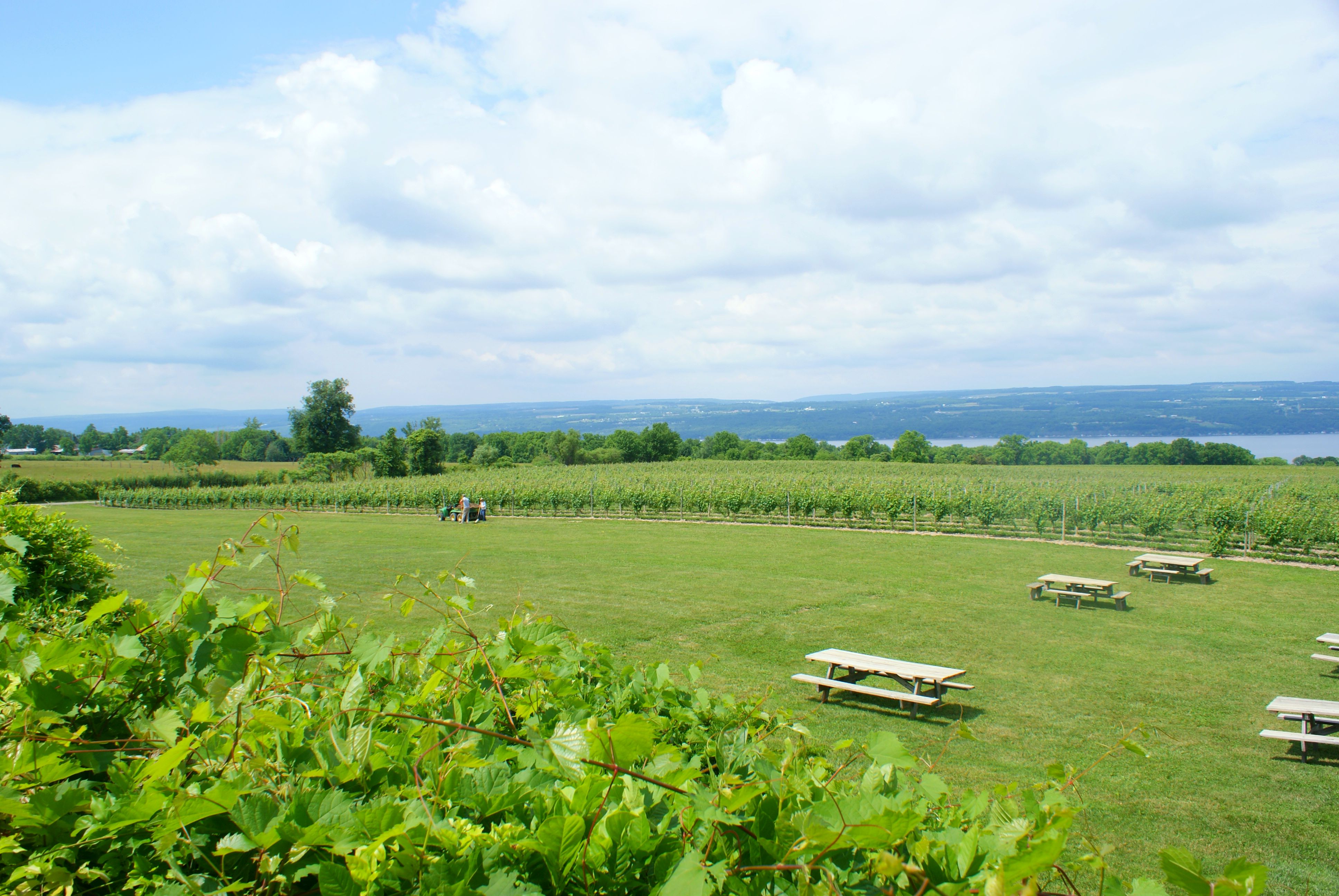
Vineyards in the Seneca Lake AVA

Viticulture and winemaking in the area date back to the 1866 foundation of the Seneca Lake Wine Company, the first major local winery. Modern wine production began in the 1970s with the establishment of several wineries and the passage of the New York Farm Winery Act of 1976. The region was established as an American Viticultural Area in 1988.

The Seneca Lake Wine Trail hosts many events on and around the lake, including the annual winter 'Deck the Halls' event showcasing local wineries' vintages.

== Transport ==
The Elmira & Seneca Lake Railway opened for operation on 19 June 1900 from Horseheads, New York, to Seneca Lake. An active railroad track still runs along the west side of the lake from Watkins Glen to Geneva and beyond, operated by Finger Lakes Railway.
