= Samuel Hart Wright =

Botanist and almanac editor

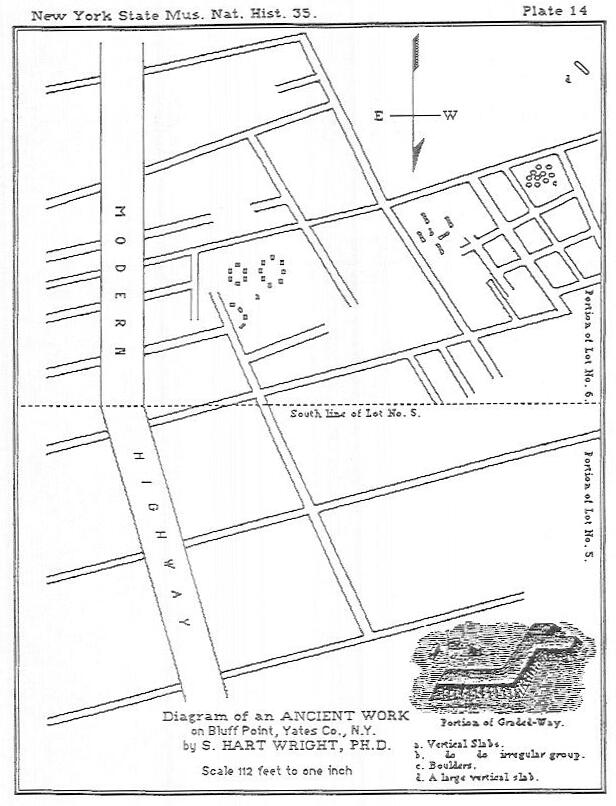
Drawing of Bluff Point Stoneworks by Samuel Hart Wright in 1879

Samuel Hart Wright (c. 1825–1905) was a farmer, astronomer, botanist, teacher, and almanac editor. He accumulated and maintained a large collection of plants. He catalogued Hartwrightia and it is named for him. He served as an editor of the Farmers' Almanac.

Wright was from Peekskill, New York and later lived in Jerusalem, New York. He taught at Dundee Academy.

He helped produce The Illustrated Family Christian Almanac for the United States in 1867.

He corresponded with John Torrey in 1870.

Wright published a regular column including a mathematics problem.

Malacologist Berlin Hart Wright (1851–1940) was his son.

Charles Willison Johnson wrote about him in 1906 in The Nautilus.

The standard author abbreviation S.H. Wright is used to indicate this person as the author when citing a botanical name.
