= Keuka Lake =

Lake on border of Steuben and Yates County, New York, USA

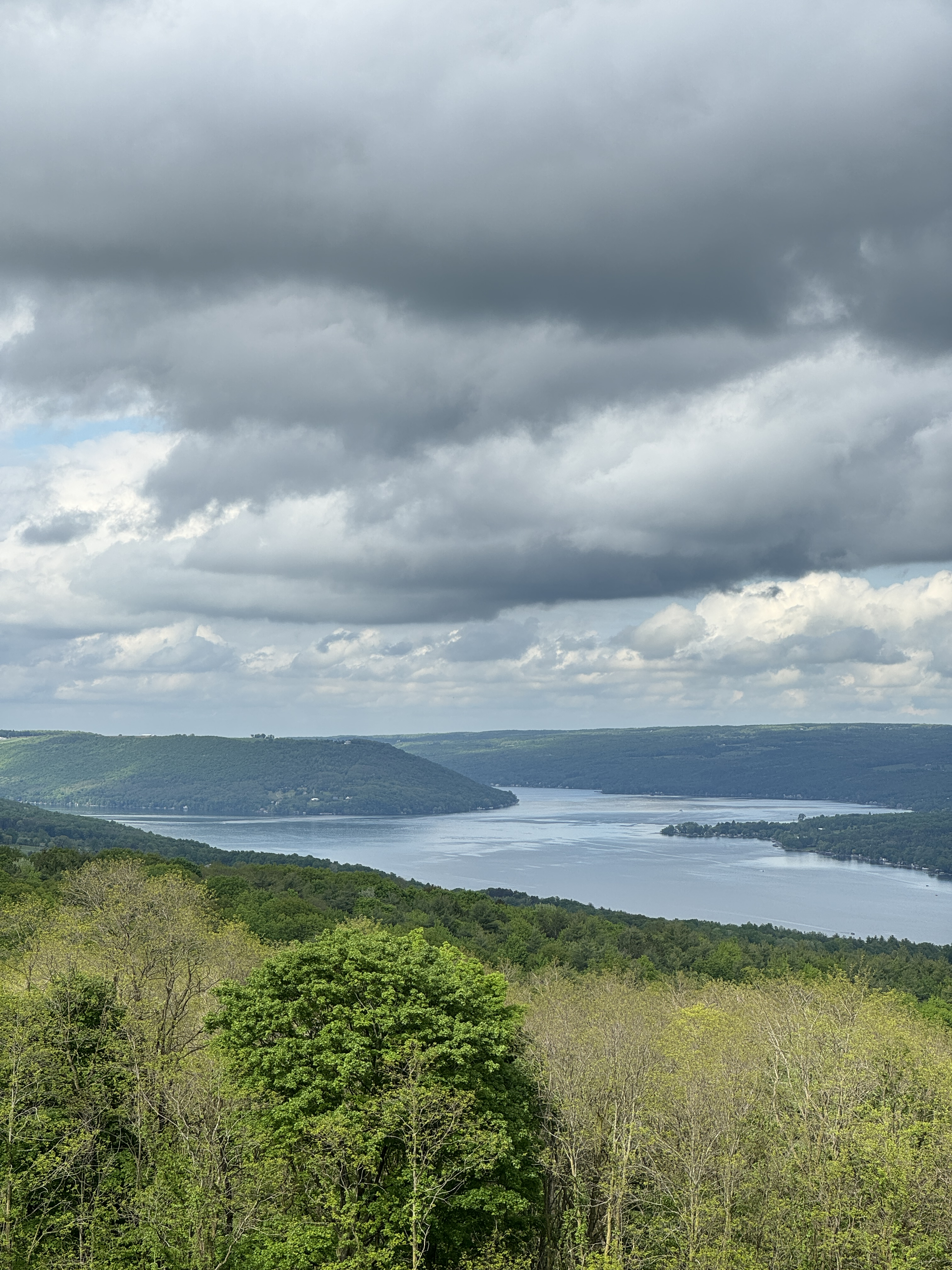
- View of Keuka Lake

- Location within New York Keuka Lake (the United States)
- Location: Steuben / Yates counties, New York, United States
- Group: Finger Lakes
- Coordinates: 42°29′47″N 77°08′46″W
- Type: Ground moraine
- Primary inflows: Keuka Inlet, Sugar Creek, Glen Brook, Wagener Glen Creek
- Primary outflows: Keuka Lake Outlet
- Basin countries: United States
- Settlements: Penn Yan; Hammondsport; Branchport

The eleven Finger Lakes of New York State.

Keuka Lake (/ˈkjuːkə/ KEW-kə) is a Finger Lake in central New York state. Spanning Steuben and Yates counties, it is the third largest in the eleven-lake chain. It is unusual for its Y-shape, which contrasts with the other long and narrow Finger Lakes, earning it the historic name Crooked Lake. Keuka means 'canoe landing' or 'lake with an elbow' in the Seneca language.

The first white settlers to the lake region came after the Sullivan Expedition during the American Revolutionary War. In 1833 the Crooked Lake Canal was completed, connecting Keuka Lake with Seneca Lake, connecting with the Erie Canal. Beginning in the first half of the 19th century many steamboats operated on the lake which largely functioned as transports between Penn Yan and Hammondsport, often in service of the wine industry. In 1872 the Bath & Hammondsport Railroad, connecting to the Erie Railroad, went into operation, replacing the use of the canal.

Beginning in the mid 19th century the lake has since been surrounded by vineyards and wineries which earned it the title, the Cradle of the Wine Industry, in New York. During the beginning of the 20th century the first flying boats were developed and tested on Keuka Lake by aviation pioneer Glenn Curtiss.

== Description ==
Keuka Lake is 20 miles (32 km) long, varies between 0.5 to 2 miles (0.80 to 3.22 km) in width, has a shoreline 60 miles (97 km)long, and covers 11,730 acres (47.5 km^{2}). It sits at an elevation of 715 feet (218 m), has an average depth of 101 feet (31 m), a maximum depth of 187 feet (57 m), and holds .35 cubic miles (1.5 km^{3}) of water.

The Y-shaped lake empties at its northeastern end through a stream in the village of Penn Yan called the Keuka Lake Outlet into Seneca Lake at the village of Dresden.

== History ==
The indigenous Seneca people of the Iroquois, who lived along its shores hundreds of years ago, referred to the two-pronged Keuka Lake as "canoe landing." In the later 18th century, the first white settlers to the area named it "Crooked Lake." In 1779, during the American Revolutionary War, the Sullivan Expedition clashed with and defeated the British who occupied the region, along with the various Iroquois tribes who were allied with them. Upon their return home, troops under the command of John Sullivan carried encouraging reports of the natural beauty and rich soils of the lake region to populations in the east. This encouraged many white settlers to migrate to the region and establish wheat farms about the lake, with grist mills along its outlet.

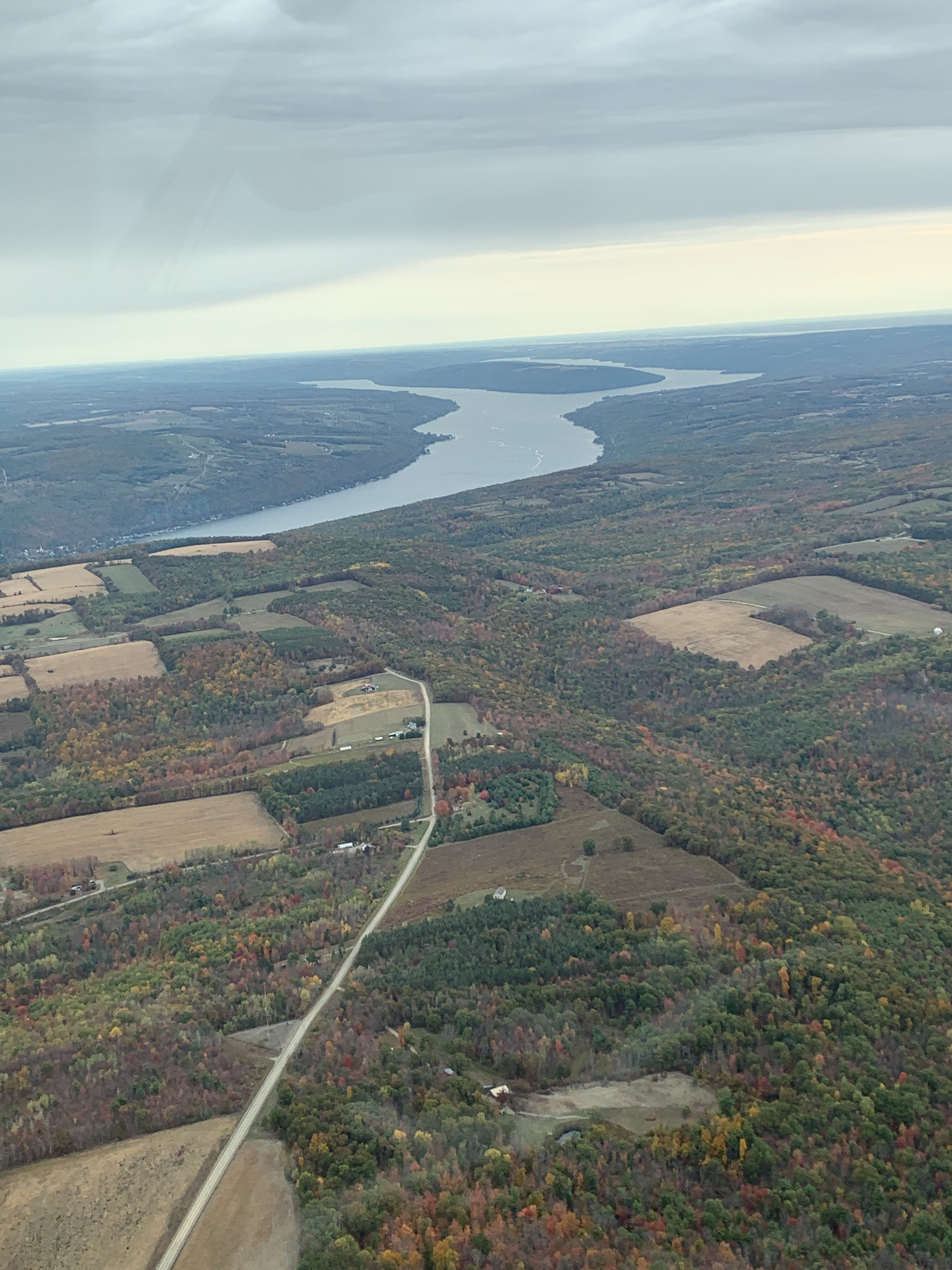
Aerial view of Keuka Lake, New York

In 1788 the township of Jerusalem, New York, was founded by the Public Universal Friend, a preacher of the Society of Universal Friends. The Friend, with a following of twenty-five other settlers, began to clear twenty-five acres of forest and built a number of log cabins along the creek which led from Keuka Lake to Seneca Lake. As the surface elevation of Keuka Lake was more than 260 feet higher than Seneca Lake, it was considered an ideal location for a grist mill, with the outlet creek providing water power. By 1790 the religious congregation numbered two hundred and sixty. Together they built the first frame house on Keuka Lake Outlet for their leader. it was a large two-story structure that housed nine fireplaces about a central chimney. A thirty-foot-square log meeting house for religious services was also built. The Friend and followers remained here from 1790 to 1794. In 1790 the first mill was established at the falls of the creek. In 1794 the first sawmill to emerge inside the village limits of Penn Yan was established by Lewis Birdsall, who commissioned Enoch Malin to oversee its construction on the outlet's north bank. In the following years there was much growth along the length of the outlet. By 1820 there were 14 sawmills, 7 grist mills, several distilleries, an oil mill, 4 carding machines (Note: According to Encyclopelædia Britannica, "Carding, in textile production, is a process of separating individual fibres, using a series of dividing and redividing steps, that causes many of the fibres to lie parallel to one another while also removing most of the remaining impurities."), all of which made use of local raw materials such as wheat, timber, flaxseed, wool and corn.

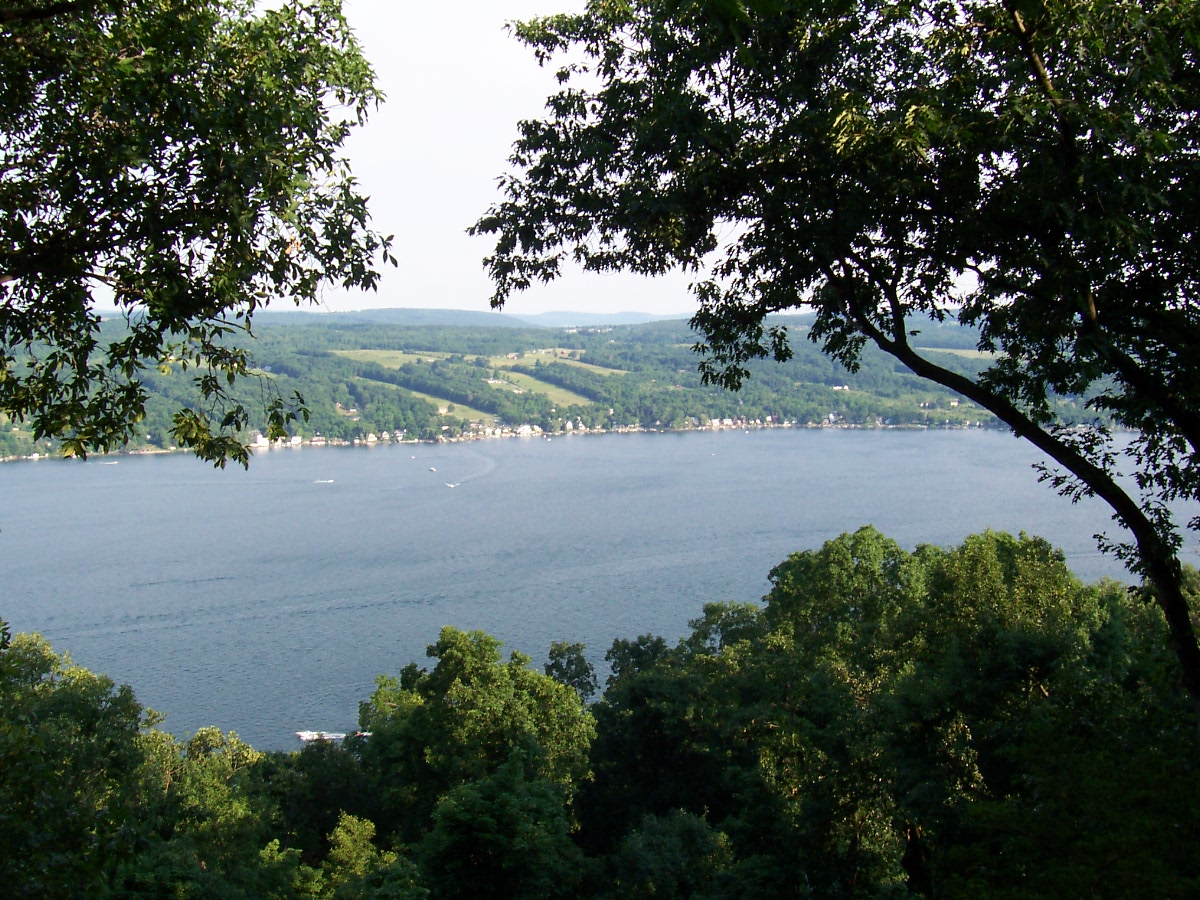
Keuka Lake

The New York State legislature, after many months of deliberation, approved the building of a canal in 1829, connecting Keuka Lake with Seneca Lake, which involved widening the northern outlet of Keuka Lake. The outlet was widened to accommodate the same size vessels used on the Erie Canal. Given the name the Crooked Lake Canal, it connected to nearby Seneca Lake and the Seneca Canal, where it connected to the Erie Canal, which connected to the Hudson River, making transports from Keuka Lake to New York City possible. The prospect of a canal, even before it was completed, inspired new business and considerable growth in the towns around Keuka Lake. In 1872 the Bath & Hammondsport Railroad went into operation. As a branch line connecting to the Erie Railroad, it soon made the canal obsolete. In 1884 the Fall Brook Railroad line was completed, which largely followed the towpath and bed of the canal, while several paper mills were constructed whose goods were shipped by this railroad. The rail route is now a hiking and cycling trail named the Keuka Outlet Trail. By 1885, the name "Keuka" had replaced "Crooked" as the name of the lake in common usage.

Keuka Lake has a long history of waterborne transport. Early in the 19th century, George McClure of Bath launched a sailboat, the schooner Sally, on Keuka Lake, then called Crooked Lake, which transported wheat and other goods between Hammondsport, located on the southern tip of Keuka Lake, and Penn Yan, located at the northern tip. Before long steamboats made the scene and were transporting grain and other produce, grown in the lake area, across the lake to Hammondsport, where it was transported by wagons to other points. By 1835 there were several steamboats running on the lake, which typically made runs between Hammondsport and Penn Yan. The first steamboat built was called the Keuka Maid, a sidewheeler of 85 feet in length, with a steam engine that was fueled by wood. The vessel remained in service until it grounded in mud and was subsequently dismantled in 1848. The second steamboat to appear was the Steuben, a side-wheeler, built in 1845, whose captain was John Gregg. In 1864 it caught fire while docked at Penn Yan. In 1847, Lemuel Hastings was the first to ship a large quantity of grapes and jelly via the canal to New York City. Following was the steamer the George R. Youngs, was launched in 1864. This vessel was 130 feet in length with an elaborate dining room. The vessel was rechristened the Steuben and remained in service until in 1879. Captain Allen Wood Keuka, introduced the Keuka, a screw steamer, to the lake in 1867. Shortly thereafter the Yates, a 115-foot sidewheeler, operated on the lake from 1872 to 1883, until she caught fire from the furnace and her boiler, which became typical of many steamboats on the lake. In 1878, a new sidewheeler, the Lulu, made her maiden voyage down the 21 miles of lake.

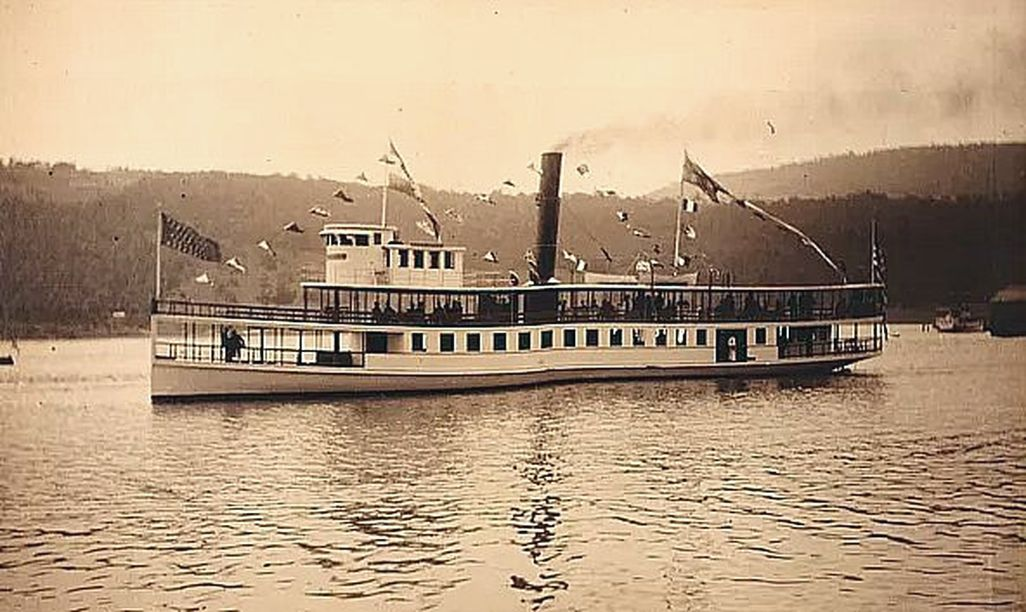
Steamboat Mary Bell, Keuka Lake, 1893

On Saturday, May 8, 1892, the steamer Mary Bell was launched into Keuka Lake. Referred to as "The Queen of ", with a 600-passenger capacity, the vessel was 150 feet in length with a beam that exceeded 20 feet, making it the largest vessel ever to cruise the lake. Built on the Hammondsport waterfront by the Union Dry Dock Company of Buffalo, the steamer cost $40,000. It achieved speeds in excess of 18 miles per hour, considered fast for a vessel of its size in those days. Judge Struble of Penn Yan delivered a speech to more than 5,000 spectators. After the speech the wife of the manager of the shipbuilding company had the honor of christening the ship, with the words, "I Christen Thee Mary Bell". After some mechanical delays with the launching apparatus the ship slipped into at 7:30 pm amid the cheers of those who came to see the event. The trial run of the entire length of was made on June 22, as the ship cruised from Penn Yan to Hammondsport at the opposite end of the lake 20 miles to the south. The Mary Bell remained in operation for 30 years. She was the last steamboat to operate on the lake in 1922, ending 85 years of steamboat history.

The wine industry got its start in 1830 when Episcopal Reverend Bostwick planted a small vineyard at his rectory in Hammondsport, which produced an exceptional vintage. He subsequently ascertained that the hilly region around the lake would be ideal for growing imported grape vines and encouraged various farmers around the lake to pursue viticulture. Bostwick never went commercial with his viticulture, but others saw such an opportunity. In 1847 William Hastings, from a vineyard of less than an acre overlooking Keuka Lake sent the first shipment of Keuka grapes, some 50 pounds, to the market in New York City. The following year he shipped 200 pounds of Isabella grapes to New York. In 1857 J. M. Prentiss shipped a ton of grapes from his Pulteney farm on the west shore of. Many farmers were subsequently inspired and began planting vineyards along the hillsides of the lake. By 1860 there were 200 acres of vineyards surrounding the lake. By 1870 there were thousands of acres of vineyards covering the countryside surrounding the lake, while numerous wineries also began to emerge around the lake. They were housed in structures typically made from the abundant flat rocks about the lakeside. With the subsequent development of the grape industry, a new prosperity to the region had been well established. Steamboats were used around this time to transport grapes and wine from the ports along the lake and take them to Hammondsport. From there they were hauled first by wagons and later by railroads, in this period prior to widespread use of automobiles. The oldest of the four important wineries was the Pleasant Valley Wine Company, founded in 1860, in Hammondsport In 1953 Konstantin Damien Frank, settled in Hammondsport. A grower of Vitis vinifera grapes, Frank encouraged other winemakers to grow this type of grape, which met both approval and disapproval from the other growers in the lake region

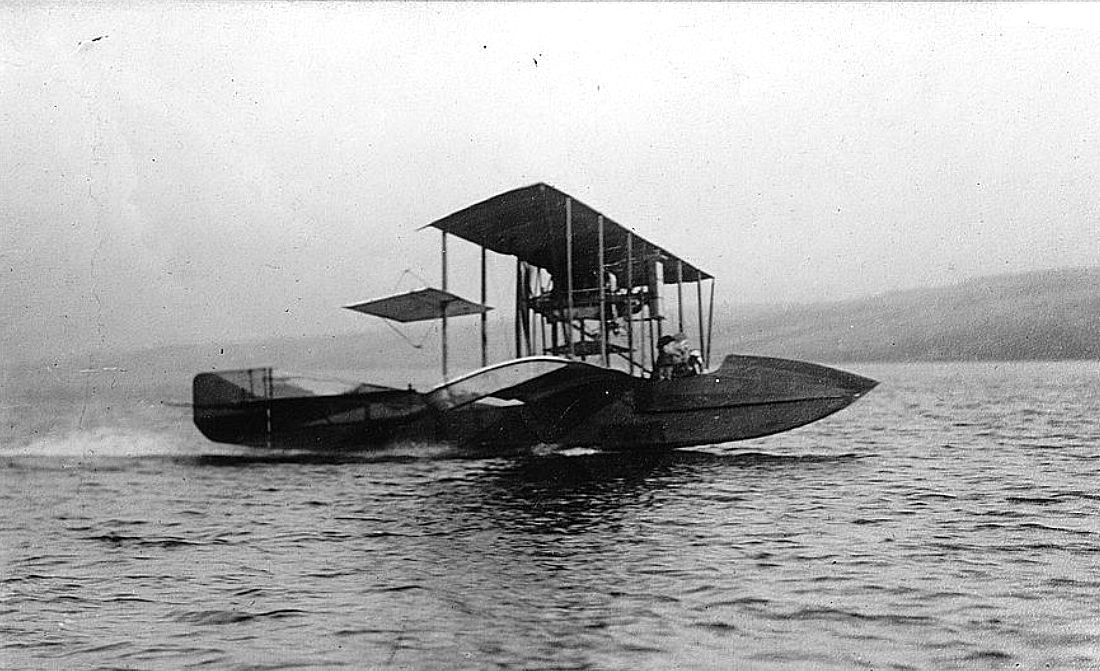
Curtiss Aircraft produced flying boat (c. 1910-1915). It, and other models like it, were developed and tested on Keuka Lake

Hammondsport was the birthplace and home of Glenn Curtiss, a pioneer of naval aviation, and is now the site of the Glenn H. Curtiss Museum. Early in the 20th century, the first watercraft airplanes invented by Curtiss were developed and tested on Keuka Lake. Several variations of the Curtiss Model H, the world's first "flying boat", made numerous take-offs and landings in Keuka Lake. During this time the Curtis Manufacturing Company was established in Hammondsport. Its great success and national notoriety is said to have "put Hammondsport and Keuka Lake on the map".

== Ecology ==
This body of water possesses large and healthy populations of lake trout, brown trout, rainbow trout, landlocked salmon, smallmouth bass, largemouth bass, and yellow perch. The productive fishery is supported by huge numbers of baitfish, most notably alewives (sawbellies), and is a very popular lake with area fishermen.

Humans, fish, and wildlife depend on the rich ecology of the lake habitat. The complex ecosystem is subject to contamination of the watershed, largely by stormwater runoff. The Keuka Lake Association (KLA) monitors the water of the lake to ensure that it is suitable for its many uses, such as drinking, fishing, and swimming. Tributary streams, groundwater, and the lake itself are regularly tested for water quality. Additionally, KLA collects and publishes data about the lake level.

The infestation of European zebra mussels, which has impacted many North American bodies of water, has also affected Keuka Lake and other Finger Lakes in New York. In addition to disrupting the lake's ecosystem, zebra mussels can be a nuisance to lakeside homeowners. Their small size enables them to clog water intake pipes. Furthermore, their sharp shells can cause lacerations on the feet of bathers. Bathers may wish to wear water shoes when swimming in the lake.

== Surroundings ==
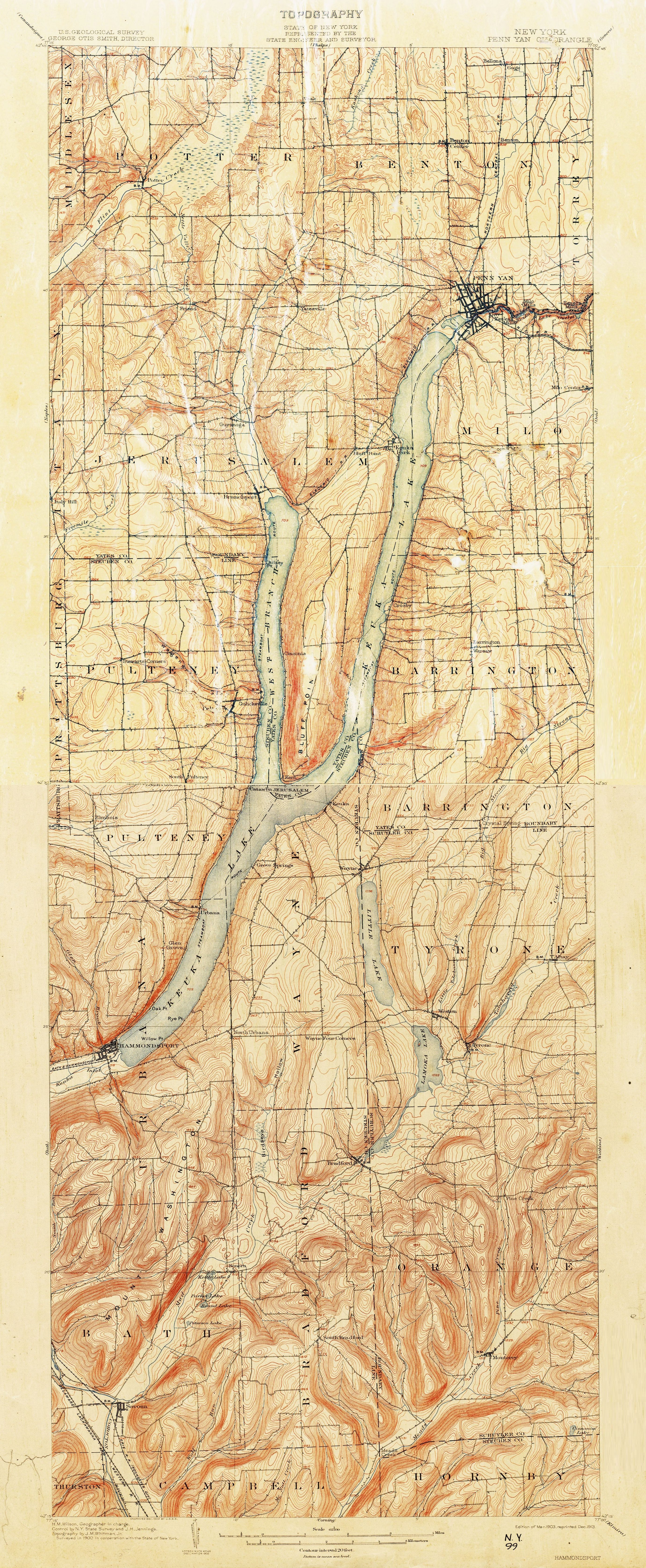
Keuka Lake, U.S. Geological Survey topographical map

The village of Penn Yan is at the northeastern tip of the lake, and Branchport is at the northwestern tip. Hammondsport lies at the south end of the lake.

While the shore of the lake is primarily residential, Keuka College is located in Keuka Park on the western shore of the east branch and Keuka Lake State Park is located on the eastern side of the northwest branch of the lake. Camp Iroquois, run by the New York State Sheriffs Institute, is located on the eastern side of the bluff. YMCA Camp Cory is located on the eastern side of the northeast branch of the lake. Camp Good Days and Special Times is located on the western side of the northwest branch of the lake. Garrett Memorial Chapel is located near the tip of the bluff between the two branches.

An important component of the economy of this region is based on grape growing and wine production.

=== Wine trail ===
These vineyards are included in the Keuka Lake Wine Trail:

- Barrington Cellars/Buzzard Crest Vineyards
- BarrelHouse 6 Distillery
- Bully Hill Vineyards
- Heron Hill Winery
- Hunt Country Vineyards
- Keuka Spring Vineyards
- Dr. Konstantin Frank's Vinifera Wine Cellars
- McGregor Vineyard Winery
- Ravines Wine Cellars
- Rooster Hill Winery
- Stever Hill Vineyards
- Point of the Bluff Vineyards

A winery on the lake, but not listed on the official Keuka Lake Wine Trail, is Domaine Leseurre.

== See also ==
- The Bluff Point Stoneworks
- Keuka College, founded 1890

== Bibliography ==
- Bretherton, Terry (2023). "Town of Urbana, Steuben County, New York est. 1822". Archived from the original on October 7, 2023.
- Casey, Louis S (1981). Curtiss, the Hammondsport Era, 1907-1915. New York: Crown Publishers. ISBN 978-0-51754-5652.
- Cattell, Hudson (2014). Wines of eastern North America : from Prohibition to the present : a history and desk reference. Ithaca, NY: Cornell University Press. ISBN 978-0-80145-1980.
- Clayton, W. Woodford (1879). History of Steuben County, New York, with illustrations and biographical sketches of some of its prominent men and pioneers. Philadelphia: Lewis, Peck & Co.
- Dumas, Frances (March 1989). "A History of the Crooked Lake Outlet". The Crooked Lake Review.
- —— (June 1989). "Along the Outlet of Keuka Lake". The Crooked Lake Review. I.
- —— (March 1990). "Along the Outlet of Keuka Lake". The Crooked Lake Review. II.
- MacAlpine, Richard S.; Mitchell, Charles R. (2015). Steamboats on Keuka Lake:: Penn Yan, Hammondsport and the Heart of the Finger Lakes. Arcadia Publishing.
- Merrill, Arch (1944). The Lakes Country. Rochester, NY: Louis Heindl & Son.
- Mitchell, Charles R (2001). Glenn H. Curtiss, aviation pioneer. Charleston, SC: Arcadia. ISBN 978-0-73850-5190.
- Molson, K. M (1995). The Curtiss HS flying boats. Ottawa: National Aviation Museum. ISBN 978-0-66012-0157.
- Palmer, Richard F. (November 1994). "Bath & Hammondsport Railroad". The Crooked Lake Review.
- —— (Fall 1998). "A Schooner on Crooked Lake". The Crooked Lake Review.
- Sherer, Richard (January 1989). "Finger Lakes Grape Pioneers". The Crooked Lake Review.
- —— (August 1995). "An Excursion on the Keuka Maid". The Crooked Lake Review.
- Wisbey, Herbert Andrew (1964). Pioneer prophetess: Jemima Wilkinson, the Publick Universal Friend. Ithaca, N. Y.: Cornell University Press.
- "The Mary Bell: The Queen of Keuka Lake: Taken from the Hammondsport Herald, 1892". The Crooked Lake Review. July 1989.

=== Further reading ===
- Beautiful Keuka Lake, from the Elmira Daily Advertiser, 1902
- Keuka Cottage Boy, by Robert V. Anderson
