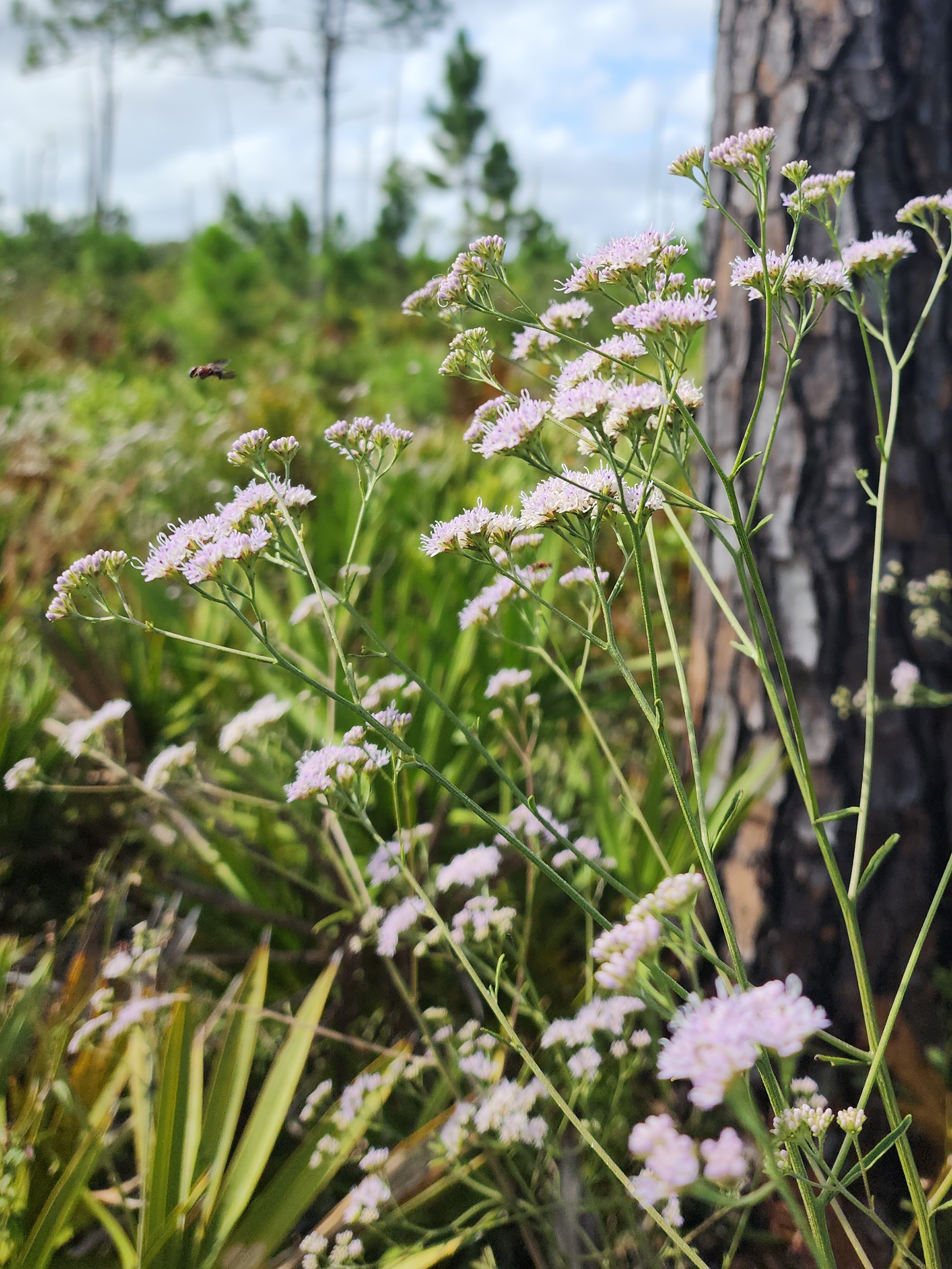

Conservation status
- Imperiled (NatureServe)

Scientific classification
- Kingdom: Plantae
- Clade: Tracheophytes
- Clade: Angiosperms
- Clade: Eudicots
- Clade: Asterids
- Order: Asterales
- Family: Asteraceae
- Subfamily: Asteroideae
- Tribe: Eupatorieae
- Genus: Hartwrightia; A.Gray
- Species: H. floridana

Binomial name
- Hartwrightia floridana A.Gray

= Hartwrightia =

Genus of flowering plants

Hartwrightia is a genus of North American flowering plants in the tribe Eupatorieae of the family Asteraceae. The genus contains a single species, Hartwrightia floridana, native to the US states of Georgia and Florida. The species is sometimes referred to by the common name Florida hartwrightia.

Although superficially similar to some species in Eupatorium, it can be distinguished by having a basal rosette of leaves, flowers of a different shape, and the fruit which lacks the parachute-like pappus found in Eupatorium. The plant is about one meter tall. It flowers in the fall and the flowers are white to pink or blue.

The genus is named for plant collector Samuel Hart Wright, 1825–1905.

== Taxonomy ==
Hartwrightia is classified in the subtribe Liatrinae of the tribe Eupatorieae, along with, for example, Liatris, Carphephorus, and Garberia. Molecular data, while placing Hartwrightia firmly within subtribe Liatrinae, give mixed results regarding its closest relative. The nuclear ITS/ETS regions place it firmly with Trilisa, with which it shares multiple synapomorphies but also differs at multiple sites. In contrast, it is almost an exact match in the plastid DNA sequences with Carphephorus corymbosus. These results suggest that Hartwrightia may be of hybrid origin but is transgressive from either putative parental lineage for multiple morphological characters

== Ecology ==
Hartwrightia floridana is a herbaceous perennial which grows in the southeastern United States (Georgia and Florida). It is found in open areas, for example in pine flatlands, but is not tolerant of grazing or solid forest cover. It seems to do better in the presence of regular fires. It is considered threatened and the biggest threat is loss of habitat. It requires wet soil, and is sensitive to hydrological changes. The seed is a sticky achene without the large pappus which would suggest wind dispersal, so it is presumed to be transmitted by animals.
