= Crooked Lake Canal =

Waterway in New York, U.S.

Coordinates: 42.683003°N 76.948353°W

The Crooked Lake Canal was a canal in western New York, United States. Built from 1830-1833, the canal linked two Finger Lakes: Keuka and Seneca. The name refers to the unusual shape of Keuka Lake, which was formerly called "Crooked Lake". The Keuka Outlet Trail now follows much of the route of the former canal.

== History ==
Encouraged by local farmers and businessmen who expected returns from a canal linking the two lakes, the state authorized a canal survey in this area in 1828. It authorized construction in 1829. From 1830 to 1833, the canal and its locks were built along the Keuka Lake Outlet, a natural stream connecting the two lakes. The Crooked Lake Canal ran under 8 miles between Dresden on the west shore of Seneca Lake and Penn Yan at the northeast end of Keuka Lake, through a system of twenty-eight locks. By contrast, the entire Erie Canal (360 miles) had 90 locks at this time. The drop between Keuka Lake and Seneca Lake was a steep 270 feet. The final cost was $157,000.

The canal opened in 1833 and immediately spurred economic growth in the region. It soon had to compete with newly constructed railroads though, which could offer faster service. Mill owners along the outlet stream had complaints about a lack of water throughout the operation of the canal. The original wooden locks soon rotted and were due for replacement with stone, at a cost of over $107,000.

After years of unprofitability, the waterway was officially abandoned in 1877. Its holdings were taken over by railroads and the rail line built along the canal became part of the New York Central Railroad. In 1972, the rail line was destroyed in flooding and related damage from Hurricane Agnes. In 1981 and 1983, Yates County acquired 6 miles of the former line and thanks to the Friends of the Outlet Trail, the trail opened on July 4, 1984. The former route of the canal is partly marked as the modern 6.7 mile Keuka Outlet Trail for hiking and biking.

== See also ==
- Crooked Lake Outlet Historic District
- List of canals in New York
- List of rail trails in New York
