= Keuka Lake Outlet =

Keuka Lake Outlet Minnesetah River
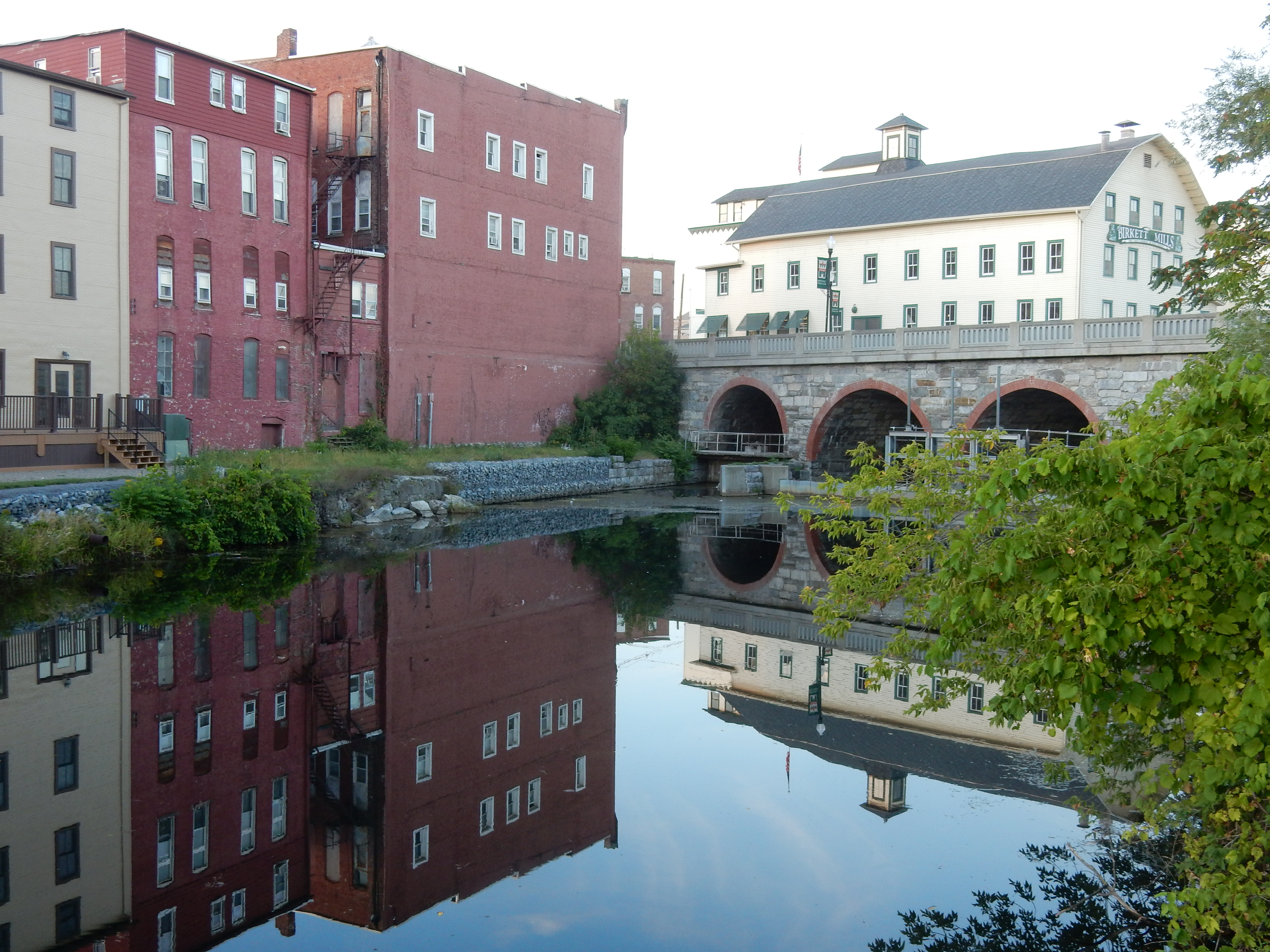
- Outlet dam and Main Street bridge in downtown Penn Yan

- Location of the mouth within New York Keuka Lake Outlet (the United States)

Location
- Country: United States
- State: New York

Physical characteristics
- Source: Keuka Lake
  - location: Penn Yan, New York, United States
  - elevation: 715 ft (218 m)
- Mouth: Seneca Lake
  - location: Dresden, New York, United States
  - coordinates: 42°41′00″N 76°56′53″W
  - elevation: 445 ft (136 m)
- Basin size: 208 sq mi (540 km^{2})

Keuka Lake Outlet is a river located in Yates County, New York. It drains Keuka Lake and flows into Seneca Lake by Dresden, New York. The Crooked Lake Canal was developed along the route of the river. The canal was later replaced by a railroad which is now a hiking and cycling trail, the Keuka Outlet Trail.

== See also ==
- Crooked Lake Outlet Historic District
