= Finger Lakes Underwater Preserve Association =

Organization to promote conservation of the New York State's Finger Lakes

The Finger Lakes Underwater Preserve Association (FLUPA) is a group of regional divers, associates, and families interested in promotion of scuba diving and the history and ecology of the Finger Lakes region of New York.

== History and Purpose ==
Most of the underwater structures currently of interest to FLUPA consist of canal barges which sank in the 19th century. These once sturdy wooden barges have become extremely fragile and are susceptible to both natural and man made means of deterioration. As such, FLUPA has installed and maintains two marked and lighted buoys which include mooring anchors to protect the underwater structures from damage by boats dropping their own anchors. These buoys can be found just north of Watkins Glen, along the west shoreline of Seneca Lake.

== Location ==
Currently, FLUPA is working on preserving and providing access to sunken canal barges in Seneca Lake near the village of Watkins Glen, New York. Seneca Lake is still connected to the New York State Canal System, and boats have been using these travel routes since the early 19th century. Thus, there is considerable history which has sunk along the waterways in this region.
