= Camp Good Days and Special Times =

- Interactive map of Camp Good Days and Special Times
- Coordinates: 42.589070°N 77.149400°W
- Established: 1979
- Website: www.campgooddays.org

Camp Good Days and Special Times, commonly called "Camp Good Days", is a residential summer camp which provides summer camping experiences for children, adults and families whose lives have been touched by cancer and other life challenges. The camp is operated by a 501(c)(3) not-for-profit organization, "Camp Good Days and Special Times Inc.", which is one of the largest organizations of its kind in the country. In addition to camping, the organization provides year-round events and activities in several locations.

== History ==
Camp Good Days was founded by Gary Mervis after his daughter Elizabeth "Teddi" Mervis was diagnosed with a malignant brain tumor at the age of nine, in 1979. Mervis believed that the loneliness of being the only child in her school and neighborhood dealing with cancer was as painful to his daughter as the treatments. To help alleviate this isolation, he organized a camping experience for Elizabeth and 62 other children with cancer.

After his daughter's death in 1982, Mervis, with the help of friends and organizations in his hometown of Rochester, New York, continued to provide summer camp sessions for other children with the disease. As the program grew, Camp Good Days and Special Times was formed. At first, week-long camp experiences were held at private camps. In 1986, the Branchport property, formerly cottage resorts "Campbell's Beach" and Pebble Beach", was purchased to provide expansion of the program.

Camp Good Days was the fourth organization of its kind in the United States and the first to be started by a lay person. As of 2010, the camp has served more than 43,000 campers from 22 states and 27 foreign countries. The camp has maintained accreditation from the American Camp Association, and has been inducted into the Safety 1st Hall of Fame by Markel Insurance Company.

This camp went on hiatus in 2020 and will return in 2021.

== Programs ==
Camp Good Days provides activities and services for children, adults and families who have been affected by cancer and other life-threatening illnesses. These include programs for children, Adult Oncology Programs, Family Programs and Brain Tumor Family Retreats. All services are free of charge for participants.

Mervis has never charged to attend camp. "I never wanted potential campers to be turned away by cost," Mervis says. "I never wanted people to have to choose between a car payment and going to camp."

== Facilities ==
The camp's fifteen acre site includes lakefront facilities and a large swimming pool, a craft-lodge, a playground, a jumping pillow, a miniature golf course, an archery range, and additional sports, residential and recreational areas.

== Location ==
Camp Good Days is located on the western shore of Keuka Lake in New York State's Finger Lakes region, at the southern edge of the hamlet of Branchport, New York. It is about 50 miles south of Rochester, New York. Its headquarters and volunteer training center are located in Mendon, NY and the camp also maintains offices in Buffalo, Syracuse, and Ithaca, NY.

== Fundraising ==
Camp Good Days holds several annual events including Golf tournaments, dinners and discos in efforts to fund its camping programs. One of its most famous fundraisers is the World's Largest Disco, an annual event held in Buffalo the Saturday after each Thanksgiving. The World's Largest Disco, which has taken place annually since 1994, regularly draws thousands of participants.

== Cancer Mission 2020 ==
On 2 December 2010, Mervis announced a new initiative to end cancer by the year 2020. This effort was the result of continued discussions, suggestions, and plans originally set forth in the Camp Good Days' Cancer Summit, held in 2009. The first step, according to Mervis, is to collect 1.5 million email addresses. From there, further summits will be held in an effort to bring together the necessary professionals from the medical, research and legislation fields.

Several notable public figures have stated their support of the cause, including the Lieutenant Governor of New York and former Rochester mayor Robert Duffy, Congresswoman Louise Slaughter, Congressman Tom Reed, Maggie Brooks, James Alesi, and David Koon.

By target year 2020, it was marred by COVID-19 pandemic, and summer camp was on hiatus until 2021.
