= Sugar Creek (Keuka Lake) =

Location
- Country: United States
- State: New York

Physical characteristics
- Mouth: Keuka Lake
  - location: Branchport, New York, United States
  - coordinates: 42°35′49″N 77°08′54″W
- Basin size: 36.2 mi^{2} (94 km^{2})

Sugar Creek is a river located in Yates County, New York. It flows into Keuka Lake by Branchport, New York.
