= World's Largest Disco =

Music festival in Buffalo, New York

- Genre: Electronic music, disco
- Location: Buffalo, New York
- Years active: Since 1994
- Attendance: 13,000+ (1979); 7,000 (since 1998); 0 (2020).
- Website: Official Web site

The World's Largest Disco is an annual event held at the Buffalo Niagara Convention Center in Buffalo, New York each year the Saturday after Thanksgiving. The event, considered to be widely popular in the area, is a tribute to the disco era and features live performances by 1970s-era musicians, along with dancers dressed in 1970s attire; it also bills itself as "the greatest people watching event on Earth."

The current event began as an annual occurrence in 1994, but it traces its history and name to a disco held in Buffalo in 1979, organized by Glenn Arnette, then-director of the Buffalo Convention Center, along with Bruce Marsh and Steve LaManna. The event, featuring The Trammps and Gloria Gaynor, was marked in Guinness World Records as the largest disco in the history, with 13,000 people in attendance. The current incarnation of the event draws 7,000, though this is only because of capacity issues; ticket sales were capped at 7,000 after the 1997 event also drew over 13,000 fans, well over the convention center's capacity. Tickets for the event regularly sell out within minutes of being put on sale, which usually occurs in early August.

The in-person event was not held in 2020 due to crowd size limits imposed during the COVID-19 pandemic in New York (state). A radio broadcast on WTSS, which will break from the station's usual Christmas music format, coincided with an Internet stream on the World's Largest Disco Web site featuring replays of video from past events. The in-person event will return in 2021, with a capacity reduced to 6,500.

The event is a charity fundraiser held by Conesus Fest for Charity to raise funds for Camp Good Days and Special Times, a summer camp for children with cancer.

== See also ==
- List of electronic music festivals
- 1970s nostalgia
