= Crooked Lake Outlet Historic District =

Historic district in New York, United States

- U.S. National Register of Historic Places
- U.S. Historic district
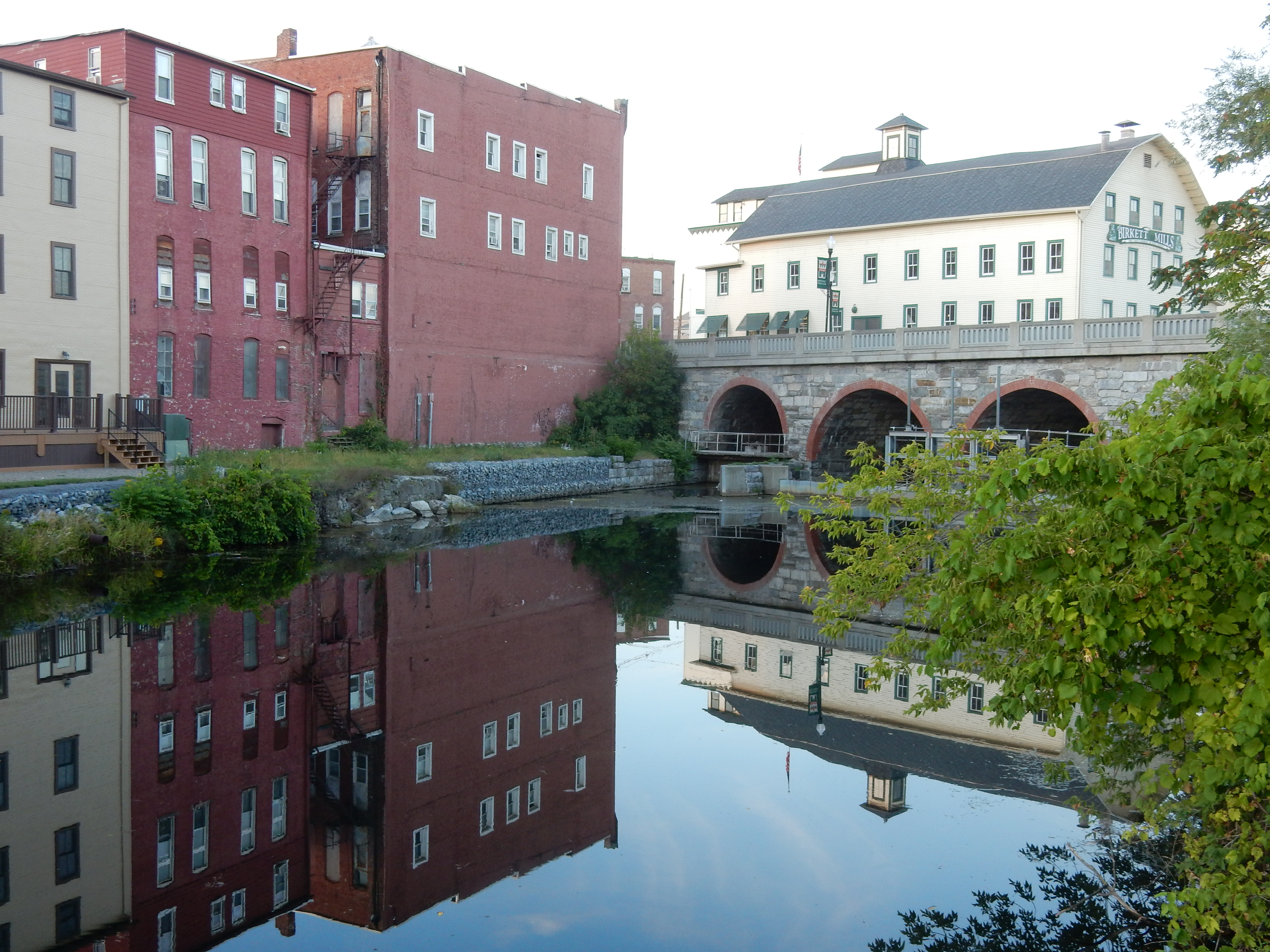
- Main Street Bridge over Keuka Lake Outlet in Penn Yan.

- Location within New York Location within the United States
- Location: Torrey, New York, between Penn Yan and Dresden
- Coordinates: 42°40′37″N 76°57′49″W
- Area: 300 acres (120 ha)
- MPS: Yates County MPS
- NRHP reference No.: 95001545
- Added to NRHP: January 19, 1996

Crooked Lake Outlet Historic District is a national historic district located near Penn Yan in Yates County, New York. The district is located along a seven-mile recreational trail (the Keuka Lake Outlet Trail) that parallels the Keuka Lake Outlet. The district includes several mill sites along the gorge. It also includes nine areas that contain surface and subsurface archaeological remains.

It was listed on the National Register of Historic Places in 1996.

== See also ==
- Crooked Lake Canal
