= Anyang Normal University =

University in Anyang, China

Anyang Normal University (AYNU; Chinese: 安阳师范学院 "Anyang Teachers College") is a comprehensive general higher education school, now located in Anyang City, Henan Province, China.
