= Keuka Park, New York =

Hamlet in New York, United States

Coordinates: 42°36′55″N 77°05′32″W

Location in Yates County and the state of New York

Keuka Park is a hamlet and census-designated place in the Town of Jerusalem, Yates County, New York. The 2020 United States census reported a population of 1,130. The hamlet is on the shore of the east branch of Keuka Lake in the Finger Lakes region.

Keuka College is located in Keuka Park next to the lake.

In September of 1979, Director Ron Miller of Keuka College, put on a show called the Symphonic Steel Band. This show was seen across the country on the TV show The American Trail.

== Demographics ==
Historical population
Census	Pop.	Note	%±
2010	1,137		—
2020	1,130		−0.6%
U.S. Decennial Census

Keuka Park has the highest ratio of women to men in the state of New York, due to the university. As of the 2010 census, there were 755 females (66.4%) to 382 males (33.6%). The median age was 21.3 years.
