= International School, Vietnam National University, Hanoi =

Founded in July, 2002, Vietnam National University, Hanoi – International School (VNU-IS) is one of the affiliated members of Vietnam National University, Hanoi to deliver joint training programs in English at undergraduate and graduate levels. Programs with degrees awarded by Vietnam National University, Hanoi (VNU) are designed in accordance with academic standards of prestigious foreign universities and approved by Vietnam National University, Hanoi.

== General information ==
All the training programs with degrees awarded by foreign universities are accredited by authorized accreditation agencies in residential countries and approved by the Ministry of Education and Training of Vietnam.

== Organizational structure ==
Rectors and Vice-Rectors

Rector: Assoc. Prof. Dr. Le Trung Thanh

Vice-Rector: Assoc. Prof. Dr. Nguyen Van Dinh

Vice-Rector: Dr. Tran Anh Hao

== Functional units ==
Office of Academic and Student Affairs

Office of Personnel and Administrative Affairs

Office of Research & Partnership Development

Office of Planning & Finance

== Academic departments ==
Department of Social Sciences - Management and Economics

Department of Science & Technology

Department of Preuniversity Training

Service and Supporting Units

Centre for Globalization Research, Consulting & Orientation Service

Centre of Quality Assurance and Testing
