= Chemung =

Chemung may refer to places in the United States:

Illinois

- Chemung, Illinois
- Chemung Township, McHenry County, Illinois

New York

- Chemung Canal, a former canal connecting Seneca Lake at Watkins Glen to the Chemung River at Elmira
- Chemung Canal Trust Company, a New York State chartered trust company based in Elmira
- Chemung County, New York
  - Chemung, New York, a town in Chemung County
- Chemung Railroad
- Chemung River, a tributary of the Susquehanna River
- Chemung Speedrome, a quarter-mile asphalt race track in Chemung

Pennsylvania

- Chemung, Pennsylvania

== See also ==
- USS Chemung
