= Catharine Valley Trail =

State park in New York, United States

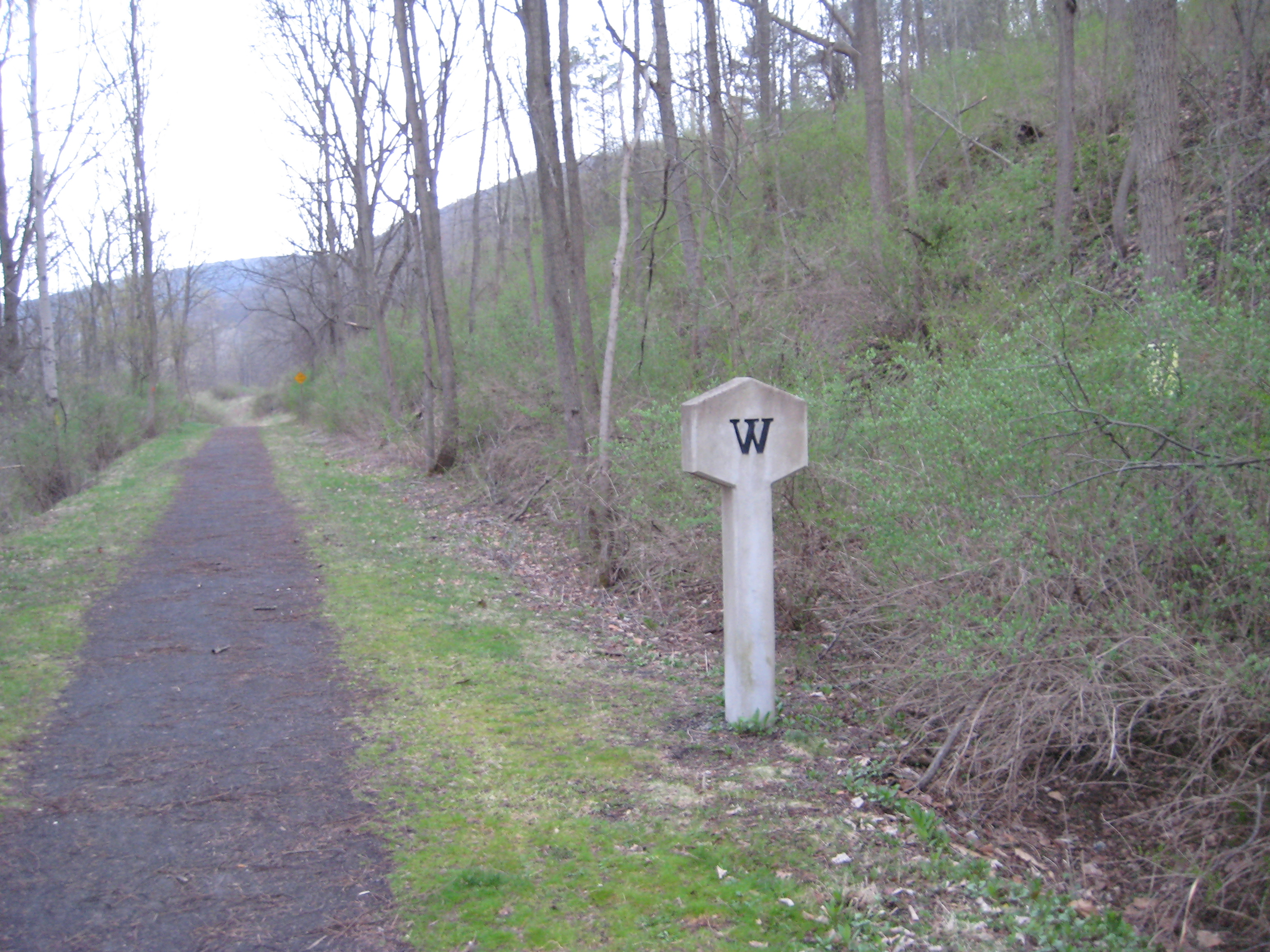
- Catharine Valley Trail, April 2010

- Location within New York
- Interactive map of Catharine Valley Trail
- Type: State park
- Location: Schuyler and Chemung counties, New York
- Nearest city: Watkins Glen
- Coordinates: 42°17′11.7″N 76°50′44.7″W
- Area: 218 acres (0.88 km^{2})
- Created: 2000
- Operator: New York State Office of Parks, Recreation and Historic Preservation
- Open: All year
- Website: Catharine Valley Trail

Catharine Valley Trail is a state park and recreation trail located in Schuyler and Chemung counties, New York. The park is located near Watkins Glen State Park and maintained by its staff, as well as by volunteers.

== Description ==
The Catharine Valley Trail (CVT) is a multi-use recreation trail that follows abandoned railroad grades and canal towpaths between Watkins Glen and Horseheads, New York. The majority of the trail is level and finished with crushed limestone, and is wheelchair-accessible. CVT also travels through the villages of Watkins Glen and Montour Falls. The trail is open year-round, and allows for walking, biking, cross-country skiing, birding and snowshoeing.

This scenic 13 mile nature trail stretches between the Seneca Lake Pier in Watkins Glen Harbor Park to the Huck Finn Trailhead in Horseheads, NY. You can see two large waterfalls right off the trail, Shequaga Falls, and Aunt Sarah's falls. Other points of interest are a small Cemetery for one of the founders of Montour Falls, the Cook family, and a "Turtle Mound" tribute to Queen Catharine. You will also often see Eagles in trees along the path.

The Ek Birding Trail is found at the Huck Finn Trailhead.The Chemung Valley Audubon Society partnered with the Mark Twain State Park and the Friends of the Catharine Valley Trail to build the Ek Birding Trail. Named to honor Rick and Bette Ek of Horseheads, the trail winds through deciduous forest, shrub land, and hemlock forest and is surrounded by cattail marsh along Catharine Creek.

There is a STQRY app (Called "Catharine Valley Trail") available for mobile phones. This multi-lingual app allows trail users to listen to the trail history along the trail and includes an interactive map.

CVT users can start from either endpoint or utilize the numerous trailheads available. Please see the TrailLink Map for parking options and detailed directions.

== History ==
Catharine Valley is named for Catherine Montour, a prominent Seneca leader who died in the late eighteenth century.

Portions of the park's trail are built upon towpaths originally constructed for the Chemung Canal, which was completed in 1830 and closed in 1878. Much of the trail's remainder follows the defunct Chemung Railroad, which was built parallel to the canal in 1850. The land that became the park was donated to the New York State Office of Parks, Recreation and Historic Preservation in 1997 by Ed Hoffman, a local resident who was the driving force of the creation of the trail since the 1970s.

The first mile of the trail was opened in 2000.

== See also ==
- Catharine Creek
- List of New York state parks
- Rail trail
- TrailLink Map
