= Catharine Creek =

- Location of the mouth of Catharine Creek in New York State. Catharine Creek (the United States)

Location
- Country: United States
- State: New York

Physical characteristics
- Source
  - location: Town of Veteran, Chemung County
  - coordinates: 42°16′15″N 76°46′21″W
- Mouth: Seneca Lake
  - location: Watkins Glen, Schuyler County
  - coordinates: 42°21′05″N 76°51′04″W
- Length: 15 mi (24 km)

Catharine Creek is a roughly 15-mile-long (24 km) stream that flows through Chemung and Schuyler counties in New York. The creek, named after Catharine Montour, is a major tributary to Seneca Lake.

== Course ==
While the other waterways of Chemung County are part of the Susquehanna River basin, Catharine Creek is part of the St. Lawrence River basin. It flows into Seneca Lake, the largest of the Finger Lakes, which drains into Lake Ontario via the Seneca and Oswego rivers.

Catharine Creek rises atop a ridge in the Town of Veteran in Chemung County. It flows south to an area known locally as the Holding Point in Horseheads. It then flows back to the north, mostly alongside Route 14, through the communities of Pine Valley, Millport, Montour Falls, and Watkins Glen.

== History ==
The Chemung Canal ran through the Catharine Creek valley from Horseheads to Seneca Lake during the mid-19th century, facilitating transportation and shipping between the southern New York region and the United States' east coast. Some remnants remain in Catharine Creek Marsh, a 1,000-acre (400 ha) wetlands complex located between Montour Falls and Watkins Glen. After the canal closed in 1878, the Pennsylvania Railroad took over much of the canal's right-of-way.

== Recreation ==
The Catharine Valley Trail, a rails to trails project, has been under development since the early 2000s by New York State and volunteers. Following former railroad beds and canal towpaths near Catharine Creek, the multi-use trail is intended to eventually link Horseheads to Seneca Lake. As of 2016, six miles (9.7 km) of the trail are open to the public, with plans for the trail to grow to 12 miles (19 km) in length.

The Catharine Creek Wildlife Management Area, managed by the New York State Department of Environmental Conservation, protects a large wetlands complex near the creek's mouth. Although camping is prohibited and no formal recreation facilities exist, the area is open to the public for hunting, hiking, bird watching, boating, and fishing. A spur of the Finger Lakes Trail passes through the marsh.

Catharine Creek is a regional sport fishing destination each spring, as anglers target the numerous rainbow trouts that enter the creek during their annual spawning runs. Smaller runs of brown trout and landlocked Atlantic salmon take place in the fall.

== See also ==
- List of rivers in New York
