= List of rebellions in the United States =

All rebellions in the United States

Multiple rebellions and closely related events have occurred in the United States, beginning from the colonial era up to present day. Events that are not commonly named strictly a rebellion (or using synonymous terms such as "revolt" or "uprising"), but have been noted by some as equivalent or very similar to a rebellion (such as an insurrection), or at least as having a few important elements of rebellion (such as an armed occupation of government property), are also included in this list. Anti-government acts by individuals are not included.

== 17th century ==
Name	Date	Location	Events	Rebel groups	Result
Revolt of the Long Swede	1669	Middle Colonies	Marcus Jacobson urges a revolt against the English Conquest of New Netherland in an attempt to restore New Sweden. (The Dutch won the Conquest of New Sweden several years earlier).	Marcus Jacobson, Armegot Printz, and a few score of Swedish settlers	Jacobson was found guilty and sentenced to be, "publicly and severely whipped and branded in the face with the letter "R" for Rebellion, after which he be secured until he can be sent and sold to the Barbadoes or some other remote plantation".
Bacon's Rebellion	1676	Colony of Virginia	Bacon's forces attacked many of the neighboring Native tribes before driving governor William Berkeley from the capitol of Jamestown, burning the city.	Virginian settlers led by Nathaniel Bacon	Suppressed by the Virginian colonial authorities after receiving reinforcements from privateer Thomas Larimore. The rebel forces, being composed of a mix of classes and races – many slaves and indentured whites among them – inspired the passing of the Virginia Slave Codes of 1705.
Gove's Rebellion	January 27, 1683	Province of New Hampshire	An attempted insurrection by Edward Gove against the recently appointed royal Governor Edward Cranfield. New Hampshire was proclaimed in 1679 in an attempt to create a proprietary colony owned by Robert Tufton Mason and Governor Cranfield was appointed to enforce the land claims.	Gove and a dozen teenagers.	All were arrested without bloodshed and arraigned on treason. Gove was sent to the Tower of London.
Boston Revolt	April 18, 1689	Dominion of New England	Popular uprising against the rule of Edmund Andros, the governor of the Dominion of New England. Dominion officials were arrested. Members of the Church of England were also taken into custody if they were believed to sympathize with the administration of the dominion.	Boston colonists	Militia took control of Boston, reestablishing the Colony of Massachusetts Bay and ending the Dominion of New England. Massachusetts' charter was permanently revoked in 1691.
Leisler's Rebellion	1689–1691	Province of New York	German American merchant and militia captain Jacob Leisler seized control of the southern portion of colonial New York and ruled it from 1689 to 1691.	Leislerians	Nine Years War militia members rebelled, took control of New York City and made merchant Jacob Leisler governor. The crown retook control two years later and executed Leisler.

== 18th century ==
Name	Date	Location	Events	Rebel groups	Result
War of the Regulation	1765 – May 16, 1771	Colony of North Carolina	War of the Regulation; Battle at the Yadkin River; Battle of Alamance	Regulators	Result – Decisive government victory. Royal governor of North Carolina, William Tryon and General Hugh Waddell (general) with 1,500 men; 2,300+ Regulators Led by Commanders and leaders Herman Husband, James Hunter, James Few (POW), Charles Harrington; Benjamin Merrill (POW) – Executed
American Revolution	1765–1783	North America	American Revolutionary War; Boston campaign Boston Massacre; Pine Tree Riot	Thirteen Colonies	The Thirteen American Colonies rejected British colonial rule, overthrew the authority of the British Crown, and founded the United States of America.
Shays' Rebellion	August 1786 – June 1787	Western Massachusetts	Paper Money Riot	Anti-austerity protesters and discontented Revolutionary War veterans led by Daniel Shays	Rising up against economic injustices and suspension of civil rights by Massachusetts. Won economic reforms in a landslide election shortly after protestors were dispersed by a privately raised militia at the Springfield Armory. Contributed to the convocation of the Constitutional Convention after the government established by the Articles of Confederation could not raise troops.
Whiskey Rebellion	1791–1794	Western Pennsylvania		Frontier tax protesters	Tax protest in the United States beginning in 1791, over 175 distillers from Kentucky were convicted of violating the tax law. Suppressed by an army personally led by President Washington
Fries's Rebellion	1799–1800			Rebel farmers	Armed tax revolt among Pennsylvania Dutch farmers. Thirty men went on trial in Federal court.
State of Muskogee	1799–1803	Florida		William Augustus Bowles, various tribes of Southeastern Native Americans	Bowles attempted to unite all the Native Americans to form a single country. Andrew Jackson destroyed the capitol Miccosukee—the largest town in Florida at the time—in 1817.

== 19th century ==
Name	Date	Location	Events	Rebel groups	Result	Notes
1811 German Coast Uprising	January 8–10, 1811	Territory of Orleans		Rebel slaves	Between 64 and 125 enslaved men marched from sugar plantations near present-day LaPlace on the German Coast toward the city of New Orleans. Militia companies were used to hunt down and kill the insurgents.	
Nat Turner's slave rebellion	August 21–23, 1831	Southampton County, Virginia		Rebel slaves	Led by Nat Turner, rebel slaves killed anywhere from 55 to 65 people. The rebellion was put down within a few days. Local blacks were massacred. Led to discriminatory legislation against both free blacks and slaves	
Dorr Rebellion	1841–1842	Rhode Island	Attempt to force a new government of Rhode Island under a new constitution that allowed more men to vote	Dorrites	Charterite victory, but later legal expansion of voting rights	
1842 Slave Revolt in the Cherokee Nation	1842	Indian Territory		Rebel slaves	Slaves escape and fight police, eventually captured.	
Anti-Rent War	1839–1845	Upstate New York		Anti-Renters	The tenants could not pay the amounts demanded, could not secure favorable terms, and could not obtain relief in the courts, so they revolted against the patroon system. There were trials of leaders of the revolt.	
Taos Revolt	January 19 – July 9, 1847	New Mexico	Cienega Affair; Las Vegas Affair; Red River Canyon Affair; Second Battle of Mora	Mexico; Local rebels	New Mexicans and Pueblo allies rebel against the United States' occupation of present-day northern New Mexico during the Mexican-American War. The rebels fought but after being defeated they abandoned open warfare.	
Cortina Troubles	July 13, 1859 – May 22, 1861	Texas, Mexico-United States border	First Cortina War; Second Cortina War	Mexico; Cortinista Militias	Juan Cortina leads a large scale revolt among dissatisfied Hispanic ranchers along the Mexican border. Federal troops, local militias, Texan Rangers, and Confederate forces put down the rebels and expel the vaqueros. Juan Cortina escapes into Mexico.	
John Brown's raid on Harpers Ferry	October 16–18, 1859	Harpers Ferry, Virginia		John Brown, Shields Green, John Henry Kagi and 21 known followers	Abolitionist John Brown initiates an armed slave revolt. Eleven rebels killed and eight captured by U.S. Marines led by Col. Robert E. Lee, Lt. J.E.B. Stuart, and Lt. Israel Greene.	
American Civil War	April 12, 1861 – May 9, 1865	Southern United States	Eastern Theater of the American Civil War; Western Theater of the American Civil War; Lower Seaboard Theater of the American Civil War; Trans-Mississippi Theater of the American Civil War; Pacific Coast Theater of the American Civil War	Confederate States of America	Seven Southern slave states seceded from the United States of America in response to the election of Abraham Lincoln as president. Four more Southern states seceded in response to Lincoln's call for 75,000 volunteers to put down the rebellion. These states formed the Confederate States of America. After four years of bloody warfare and over one million total casualties, the Confederates were defeated and Union reestablished. See Reconstruction for aftermath.	
New York City draft riots	July 13–16, 1863	Lower Manhattan, New York City, New York	Riots expressing discontent with new draft law; white attack on blacks because of economic competition.	Residents of New York City	New York Guard and Union Army troops restored order.	Largest civil and racially-charged insurrection in American history.
Battle of Liberty Place	September 14, 1874	New Orleans, Louisiana		White League	Attempted insurrection by the Crescent City White League against the Reconstruction Louisiana state government. Federal troops restored the elected government.	Part of anti-Reconstruction violence against the Union.
Election Riot of 1874	November 3, 1874	Eufaula, Alabama		White League	White supremacists take Republicans out of office and declared the Democrats as winners	Part of anti-Reconstruction violence against the Union.
Mason County War	February 18 – December 1875	Mason County, Texas		German-American Vigilantes	German settlers clash with Anglo-Saxon cattle rustlers and lynch several, forming mobs of vigilantes known as Hoodoos. Violence continues until Texas Rangers arrive and arrest criminals.	
Great Railroad Strike of 1877	July 14 – September 4, 1877	Many cities across the United States, violence especially strong in Appalachia		Workingmen's Party, Railroad workers	Railroad workers go on strike after multiple wage cuts. An estimated 100 people are killed in clashes between militias, National Guard troops, police, and strikers. Unions become more organized. Strikers win some compensation. States re-organize their National Guards.	
Greenwood, New York, insurrection of 1882	February 1882		New York governor Alonzo Cornell proclaimed a state of insurrection after local residents resisted the seizure of property to pay for railroad bonds from the Rochester, Hornellsville, and Pine Creek Railroad. Residents of Greenwood refused with violence and threats of more violence in response to the governor's attempts to get the citizens to pay a tax levied to repay money that Greenwood had borrowed to help construction of a never-built railroad.	Citizens of Greenwood	Taxes paid, insurrection ended at threat of calling out militia.	Molly Maguires said to be involved.
Johnson County War	July 20, 1889 – May 24, 1893	Johnson County; Wyoming; Powder River Country		Homesteaders	Grazing and water right disputes between cattle corporations and settlers explodes into violence. Buffalo Soldiers end lawlessness and restore order. Cattle Association loses monopolistic control over Wyoming beef.	
Yaqui Uprising	August 12–14, 1896	Sonora, Arizona		Yaqui	Yaqui launch a revolt against Porfirio Diaz's government in Nogales, just across the border with Arizona, in response to mistreatments of Natives. Mexican infantry, American militia, Buffalo Soldiers and local police combine to crush the Yaqui.	
Wilmington massacre	November 10, 1898	Wilmington, North Carolina		Waddell's Army Segregationist rioters	Successful removal of local government, retaining segregationist policies.	

== 20th century ==
Name	Date	Location	Events	Rebel groups	Result	Notes
Green Corn Rebellion	August 2–3, 1917	Seminole County, Oklahoma		Rebel farmers	The uprising was a reaction by radicalized European-Americans, tenant farmers, Seminoles, Muscogee Creeks and African-Americans to an attempt to enforce the Selective Draft Act of 1917 during World War I. The country rebels met with a well-armed posse of townsmen, with whom shots were exchanged and three people killed.	
Camp Logan Mutiny	c. August 23, 1917	Houston, Texas		24th Infantry Regiment	The all-Black regiment of the 24th mutinies after Houston policemen arrest and pistol whip Private Edwards. Enraged, they march through the streets of Houston and kill eleven civilians and a captain of the Illinois National Guard. Martial law is declared by Governor James E. Ferguson. Thirteen are sentenced to death after the largest murder trial in American history.	
Mexican Border War	c. November 20, 1910 – June 16, 1919	Texas, Mexican American border, Chihuahua		Constitutionalistas, Pancho Villa, Many Mexican civil war factions	The chaos from the Mexican Revolution spills over onto the Texas border. Several towns and military installations are raided by several Mexican groups with varying goals ranging from reclaiming lost territories in the USA to simply plundering. Federal troops pursue Pancho Villa into Chihuahua, but he escapes. American marines occupy Veracruz.	Part of United States involvement in the Mexican Revolution
Coal Wars	c. 1890–1930	Eastern United States and Colorado	Coal Creek War; Colorado Coalfield War; Battle of Blair Mountain	Miners and unions	The Coal Wars, or the Coal Mine Wars, were a series of armed labor conflicts in the United States, they occurred mainly in the East, particularly in Appalachia.	
Battle of Athens (1946)	August 1–2, 1946	McMinn County, Tennessee		Angered citizens, including World War II veterans	Citizens assaulted buildings in response to voter intimidation and election corruption. This later resulted in reforms.	
San Juan Nationalist revolt	October 30, 1950	Puerto Rico	Jayuya Uprising; Utuado Uprising	Puerto Rican Nationalist Party	Nationalist revolt that took place on October 30, 1950, in the town of Jayuya, Puerto Rico. The top leaders of the Nationalist party were arrested, including Albizu Campos and Blanca Canales, and sent to jail to serve long prison terms.	
Black Power movement	1960s – 1980s	Nationwide	Ghetto riots (1964–1969) Selma to Montgomery marches Long, hot summer of 1967; Assassination of Martin Luther King Jr. King assassination riots Glenville shootout 1969 Greensboro uprising Assassination of Fred Hampton	Black Guerilla Family; Black Liberation Army; Black Panther Party; Black Revolutionary Assault Team; George Jackson Brigade; M19CO; MOVE; Symbionese Liberation Army; Weather Underground; White Panther Party	Hundreds killed and thousands arrested in riots. Civil Rights Acts of 1964 and 1968 and Voting Rights Act of 1965 passed. Increased desegregation in the United States. Fewer incidents of mass racial violence in the United States.	
Red Power movement	1960s – 1970s		Occupation of Alcatraz; Bureau of Indian Affairs building takeover Wounded Knee Occupation	American Indian Movement; Indians of All Tribes	Occupation of Alcatraz resolved peacefully after 18 months. One-week takeover of Bureau of Indian Affairs building resolved peacefully. Three occupiers killed in two-month Wounded Knee Occupation. Indian Self-Determination and Education Assistance Act of 1975 passed.	The American Indian Movement claimed it was never involved in the Occupation of Alcatraz.
Attica Prison riot	September 9–13, 1971	Attica Correctional Facility, Attica, New York	Prison riot after the killing of George Jackson	Inmates	Prison is retaken by the New York State Police on orders from Governor Nelson A. Rockefeller.	
Occupation of Catalina Island	August 30 – September 22, 1972	Santa Catalina Island, Los Angeles County, California	Seizure of Santa Catalina Island by pro-Chicano militia.	Brown Berets	Los Angeles County Sheriff recaptured the island, the Brown Berets surrendered without resistance.	

== 21st century ==
Name	Date	Location	Events	Rebel groups	Result	Notes
2014 Bundy Standoff	April 5–14, 2014	Bunkerville, Nevada	Armed confrontation between Cliven Bundy's militia allies and the Bureau of Land Management over Bundy's refusal to pay fees for grazing his cattle on federal land, as Bundy asserted the federal government had no right to own the land. Bundy also alleged that the BLM attempted to "round up his cattle".	Oath Keepers Three Percenters Other local militia groups tied to the American militia movement	Bureau of Land Management ends attempt to round up cattle but continues actions in court. Bundy's son and friends would later occupy a wildlife refuge in Oregon for similar goals.	Related to the Occupation of the Malheur National Wildlife Refuge
Occupation of the Malheur National Wildlife Refuge	January 2 – February 11, 2016	Malheur National Wildlife Refuge, Harney County, Oregon	Seizure and occupation of federal property by an armed group. The participants were acting on their view that the federal government is constitutionally required to turn over most of the federal public land they manage through federal agencies, to the individual states.	Radical right militias led by Ammon Bundy	Occupation ended by police followed by criminal proceedings and convictions. Most participants, including Ammon and Cliven Bundy, would be acquitted in federal court.	Related to the Bundy standoff.
United States racial unrest (2020–2023)	May 26, 2020 – September 26, 2023	Nationwide	Nationwide unrest following police killings, most notably the murder of African-American man George Floyd in Minneapolis in May 2020. Activists sought to oppose racism and police brutality. Protests and riots began in Minneapolis and spread across the country, with prolonged occupation by protestors of George Floyd Square in Minneapolis, Capitol Hill in Seattle, and downtown Portland.	Supporters of Black Lives Matter and Defund the police movements	Police and federal forces deploy and maintain control. George Floyd protests subside in 2021 after the conviction of Floyd's killer Derek Chauvin, though localized unrest continued into 2023. Reforms targeting police brutality and racism are implemented.	
2021 United States Capitol attack	January 6, 2021	United States Capitol, Washington, DC	Supporters of President Donald Trump, some of whom were armed, stormed the Capitol building after a rally held in Washington D.C by the President, his sons, and his personal attorney, Rudy Giuliani. They broke through barriers, assaulting Capitol Police officers, and broke down doors, smashed through windows, and stole public property. The supporters obtained access to the Senate Floor, balconies, and offices; and sat at the Senate President's desk.	Supporters of President Donald Trump: Oath Keepers, Proud Boys, Three Percenters, America First Movement and others	Failure to overturn the presidential election; delay of counting electoral votes by several hours; resumption of presidential transition leading up to the inauguration of Joe Biden. Second impeachment of Trump. Other political, legal, and social repercussions.	Part of the attempts to overturn the 2020 United States presidential election Most severe assault on the Capitol since the 1814 burning of Washington by the British Army.

== See also ==
- List of incidents of civil unrest in the United States
- Terrorism in the United States
- List of invocations of the Insurrection Act
