= Elmira and Seneca Lake Railway =

Railway in New York

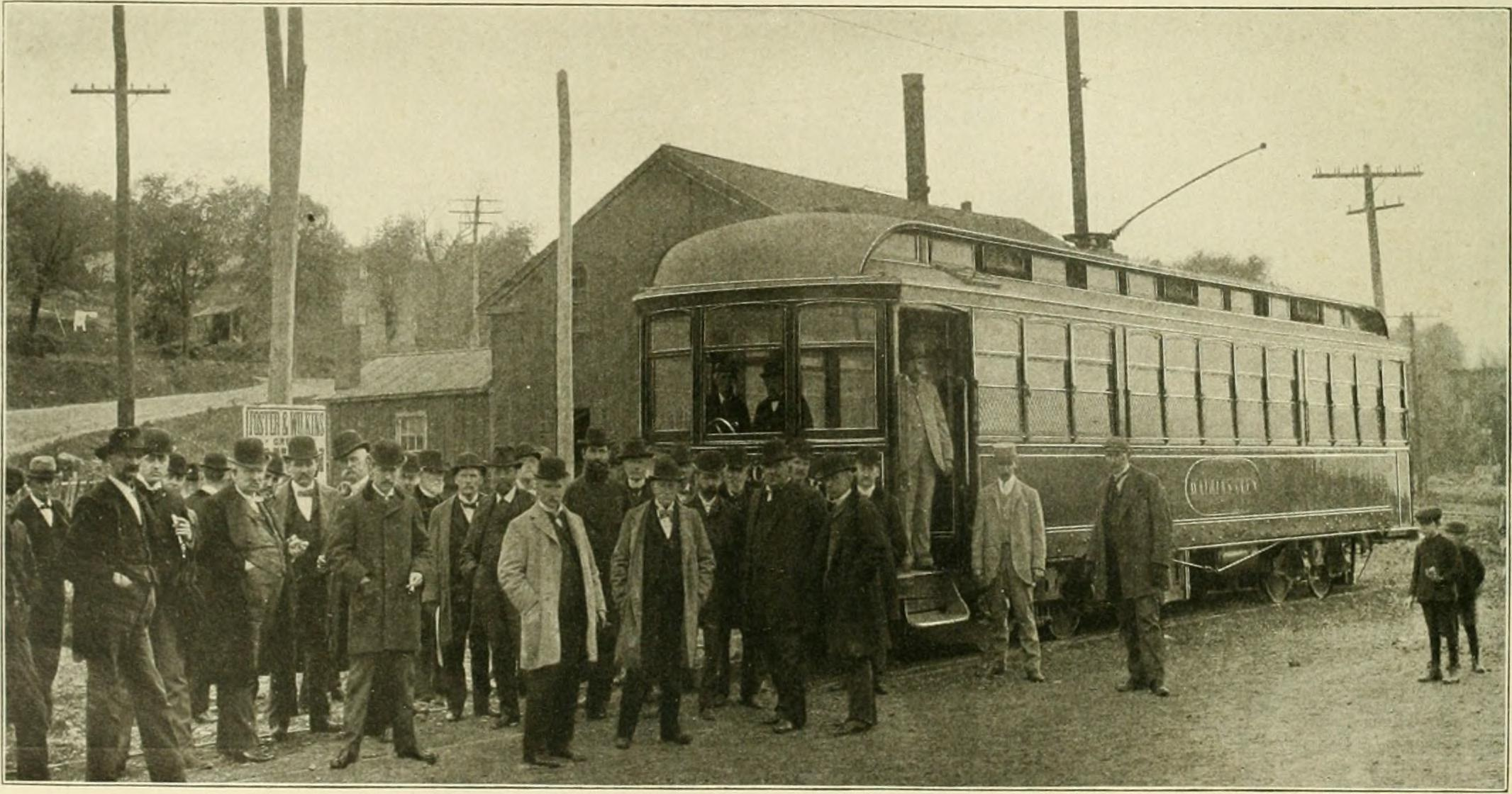
Formal opening with first car over the Elmira & Seneca Lake Railway

The line of the Elmira & Seneca Lake Railway Co. from Horseheads, New York to Seneca Lake was opened for operation on June 19, 1900.

== Route ==
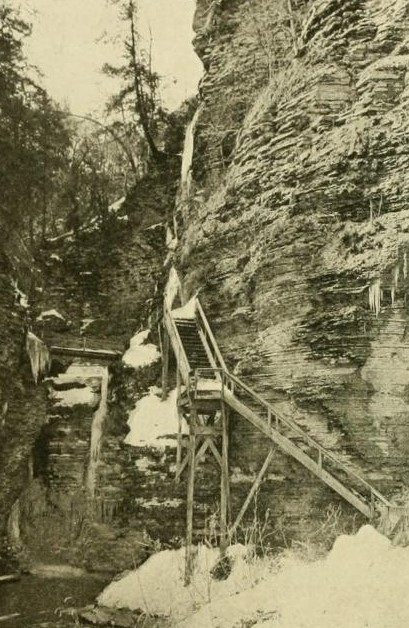
Watkins Glen

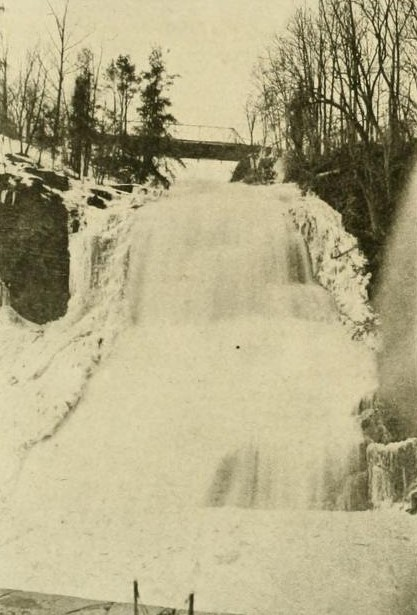
Montour Falls

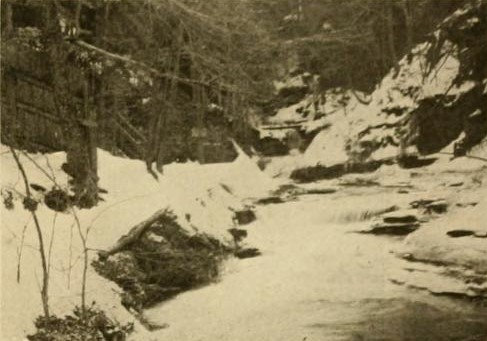
Entrance to Havana Glen

Horseheads was the terminus of the Elmira & Horseheads Railway, over which the cars of the Elmira & Seneca Falls company later entered and left Elmira. The route was on Main Street, in Horseheads, until the Chemung Canal was reached; this canal had been abandoned as a waterway some years before the railway was built, and the towpath was subsequently owned by the railway company as its right of way. The line passed through a well-settled country and the villages of Pine Valley and Millport, and left the private right of way on reaching the town of Montour Falls. Then it proceeded through the main streets of Montour Falls, and along New York State Route 14 to Watkins Glen, and through Watkins Glen to the northern terminus at the lake. The road passed through two counties, Chemung and Schuyler, and directly to the entrances of Watkins Glen State Park at Watkins Glen and Havana Glen Park at Montour Falls. The terminus at Watkins Glen was on the shore of Seneca Lake adjacent to the depot of the Northern Central Railroad Co., and connected with the steam boat lines of the Seneca Lake Transportation Co.

Seneca Lake is a fine body of water about 40 miles (64 km) long, and there are a number of summer resorts and cottages along its shores reached by the steamboats.

When this route was projected, it was with many doubts as to the ultimate completion of the road, but the officials of the railway company after thoroughly examining the field decided to award the contract for designing, constructing and equipping the road to the American Engineering Co., of Philadelphia, which immediately prepared plans and specifications and commenced grading for the roadbed. The cuts were 10 feet (3.0 m) wide at grade line with side slopes of 1½ lo 1 and ditches for drainage at the base of the slope; the fills were made 10 feet (3.0 m) at the grade line after being allowed to settle along the private right of way. It was necessary to change the course of the Catherine Creek at four different points and wherever the creek was adjacent to the fills they were protected from washing by oak piles driven 5 feet (1.5 m) apart parallel with the creek, with willow mattresses placed between and behind the piling and backed by stone rip rap work.

Wherever the line of road crossed the creek there were erected plate girder or through span steel bridges, which were furnished by the Berlin Iron Bridge Co. and the Havana Bridge Co. The bridges were set on foundations of cut stone laid in Portland cement, none but dimension stones being placed in the faces of the walls. The track over all bridges had inside guard rails of the same section as the running rails, laid parallel to and 4 inches (100 mm) from them. The bridges had fender pieces with notches on the underside to receive the ties; the fender pieces were held in place by bolts with washers on each end. Exposed parts of ties and also the notches were treated with two coats of red lead to prevent absorption of moisture.

== Rails ==
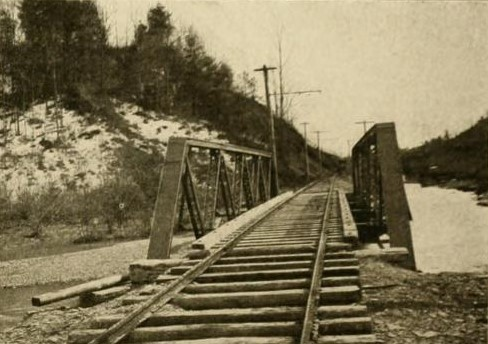
Typical bridge

The rails were a 56 lb/yard (28 kg/m) T-section rolled by the Carnegie company. They were laid on ties 6x8 in. x 8 ft., of hewn oak and chestnut, spaced 18 in. on centers except at joints, where they are spaced 14 in.; the joints were suspended. The track was surfaced on a bed of 12 in, of creek gravel; stone ballast was filled in level with the tops of the ties, having the natural slope from the ends of the ties. The track was bonded with No. 0000 Morris protected stranded copper bonds, and cross-bonded every 200 ft. Ground plates were buried in the stream, wherever a crossing is made and connected to the track circuit by four No. 00 wires: four wires are used to guard against breakage.

== Overhead lines ==
The overhead construction was with side poles except through the towns and villages, where the span construction was used. Side poles were 30 feet (9.1 m) in length, 7 inches (18 cm) at the top, with seamless steel bracket arms supporting clips for suspension wire, having the overhead wire supported from an eyebolt attached to the top of the pole. All suspension and pull-off wire was stranded galvanized iron. The trolley wire was No. 00 grooved section, hung on insulators with the General Electric Co's, special mechanical clip for this pattern of wire.

The feeder system consisted of 13 miles of No. 0000 solid copper wire, insulated in the towns and bare on the private way. It was hung on glass insulators supported by cross arms on the side poles. Lightning arresters were placed every 1,000 feet (300 m) and grounded on to track circuit.

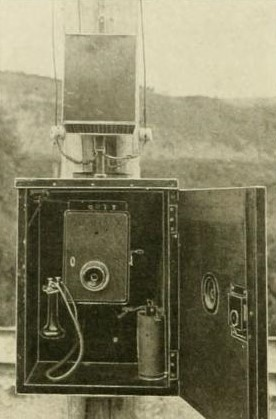
Telephone on pole

The telephone signal system was furnished by the Novelty Electric Co., and consisted of a telephone at each of the sidings and terminals. There were also instruments at the power house and office so that a car at any siding could communicate with the power house or office, and with another car through the office, or the office could reach any car on the lines by ringing bells which are placed along the line, bridged in circuit, which notify the car that is wanted. Each telephone was numbered the same as the siding at which it is located, and the system was found to work very satisfactorily.

The road was fenced for its entire length over the private right of way, nearly 12 miles (19 km), with galvanized wire. The fencing was supported on iron posts every 10 feet (3.0 m) and had wooden end and brace posts; the grade crossings were protected by cattle guards made of triangular oak pieces. All farm crossings were put below grade through special cattle passes.

== Depot ==
The car barn was located parallel to the railway near the power house. It was 250 by 50 feet (76 m × 15 m) and contained four tracks with a shop and the employees' room in the end nearest the power house; the building and pits were heated with exhaust steam from the power house, which was piped underground from the latter. The building and special work leading from it were lighted with enclosed arc lights; the pits and rooms were lighted with incandescent lamps. The sides of the pits were of brick and were built 2 feet (0.61 m) outside of and parallel to the tracks. The tracks were carried over the pits on trestles to allow space at the sides for light and ventilation.

== Power house ==
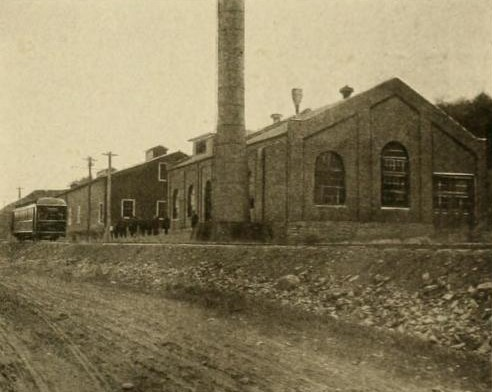
Exterior of power house

The power house was a brick building on a stone foundation laid in cement mortar. The roof was carried in steel trusses and covered with slate, with Ved tile trimmings. The floors of both engine and boiler rooms are of cement.

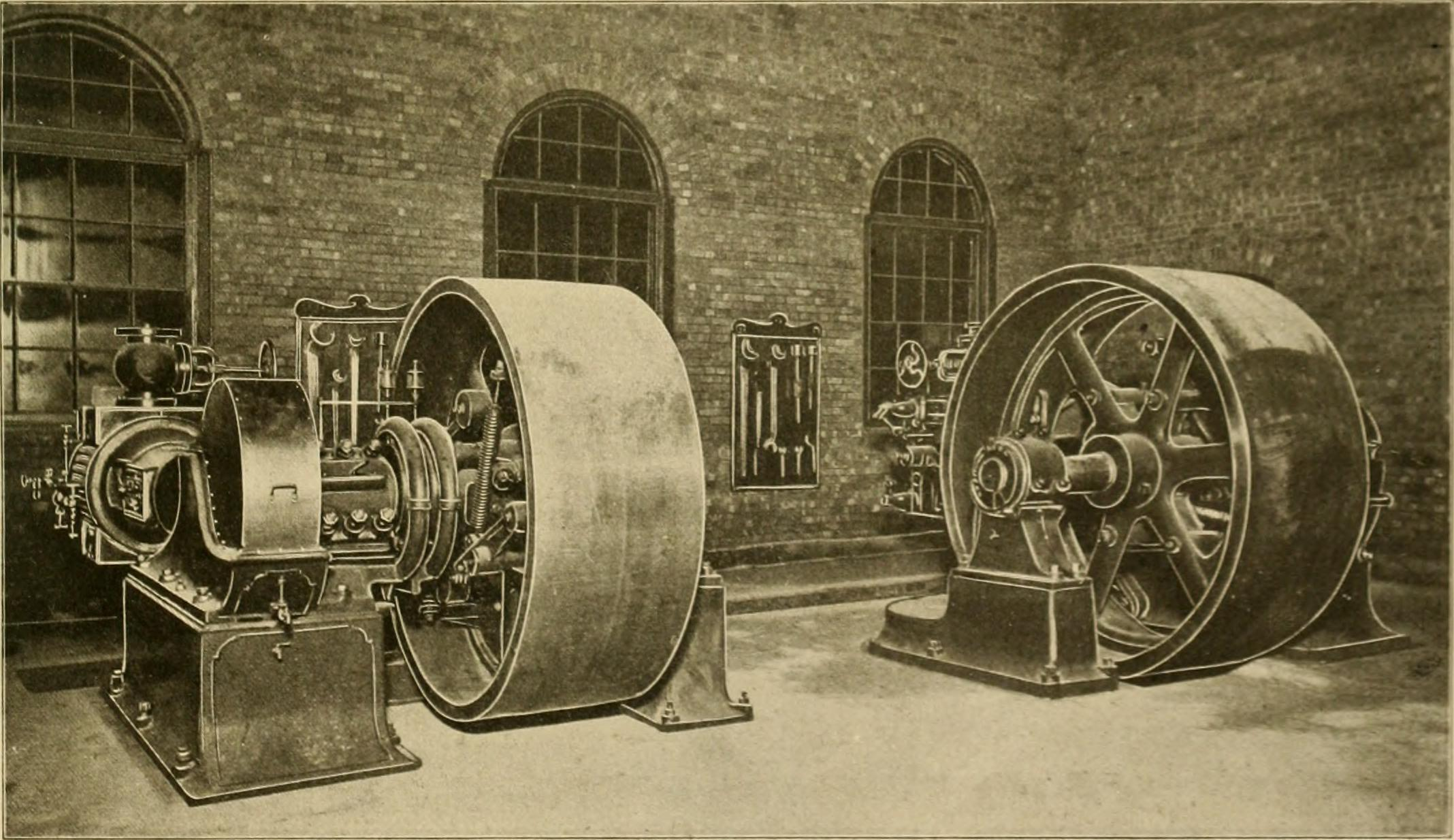
Harrisburg 4-valve engines in the power house

The engine room equipment comprised one 350-h.p. engine driving a 325-kW generator and one 250-h.p. engine driving a 225-kW generator; the two generators were Westinghouse. Both of these engines were made by the Harrisburg Foundry & Machine Works, of Harrisburg. Pa., and were of the type known as the Harrisburg four-valve self-oiling simple engine. This type was one of a complete series made by the company and has been specially designed to give satisfactory and efficient service under the following conditions: Steady, or if required, varying load; belted or direct connected to the generators; exhaust either free to atmosphere, or, if unavoidable, subjected lo back pressure; steam pressure from 70 to 100 lb; low-priced attendants; units from 75 to 700 h.p.; compact floor space; quiet operation; a water rate from 25 to 28 lb. per hour. The four valves were cylindrical in form and perfectly balanced under all conditions; the two steam valves had removable bushings which render repairs positively reliable. There were two eccentrics, one actuating the two steam valves and one the two exhaust valves, the motion being transmitted to wrist plates by in dependent rocker arms; this design was justified because the arrangement permits a rapid acceleration of the valve gear and secures sharp cut-off and release. The valve gear was made as simple as possible and close adjustment could be secured so that in operation there was no clattering or noisy vibration. The wrist plates and the wrist plate pin were made of a special steel, the pin being lined with adjustable sections of phosphor bronze. Lubrication of the pins was accomplished by means of compression grease cups on the outside end of each pin thus allowing the operator to force the lubricant into use without exposing himself in the least to the mechanism.

The switchboard was of white marble equipped with Keystone and Weston instruments. A detector bell was provided which rang when a circuit breaker opened and continued sounding until the circuit was closed. All wiring from the generators to the switchboard was carried under the engine room floor.

Adjoining the switchboard was the telephone booth and near it were a tool room, a dressing room and the office for the engineers.

The steam piping, which was completed under the direction of Mr. A. C. Thompson, consisted of a main header with a branch for each engine turned from it and a Bundy automatic trap for returning hot water drippings to the boilers.

In the boiler room were two 300-h.p. boilers, an American feed water heater and two Snow pumps. Coal storage pockets were directly in front of the boilers, and coal was deposited in the pockets through a steel-lined chute leading from a railroad siding parallel to the building and some 45 feet (14 m) above the pockets. Coal was thus unloaded into the storage pockets without cost for handling. The stack was 125 feet (38 m) high: it was of steel, brick lined, and titled with lightning rods.

Water for the plant was secured by damming a branch of Catharine River and laying a pipe with natural gravity flow to a well in the boiler room. Analysis of the water showed it to be first-class for steaming purposes. The water dammed back being on the company's property, it was planned to be used as a resort for picnicking in summer and skating in winter.

== Rolling stock ==
The car equipment consisted of 12 cars, four of them similar to that used for the formal opening of the line. Two of these four had smoking compartments, the other two had both baggage and smoking compartments. They were equipped with four G. E. 1.000 motors, K-11 controllers, Christenson automatic air brakes, and Wagenhals arc headlights. The interior was finished in cherry and mahogany; the seats were of the walkover pattern, covered with rattan. They were lighted with four five-light clusters of handsome design; these cars were fitted with electric push buttons. Of the other eight cars, six were open 15-bench cars and two closed 28 feet (8.5 m) cars; they were equipped with Westinghouse motors and G. E. K-11 controllers and had Syracuse changeable headlights. The cars were painted Pullman green with gold striping and each had the name of one of the towns on the route as well as the number. All cars had a tool box containing pliers, wrench, and trolley wire pickup for use in case of emergency repairs, or picking up broken trolley wire.

== Inauguration ==
After the inspection and opening trip those present enjoyed an elaborate banquet at the Rathbun House, Elmira, as guests of the American Engineering Co.

The people along the line of route have shown their appreciation by their generous patronage, the present equipment being taxed to its utmost capacity since the opening of the road.

== Personnel ==
The officers of the Elmira & Seneca Lake Railway Co. were initially:

- President, Gen. John E. Mulford, Montour Falls, N. Y.
- Vice-president, John Blair MacAfee, Philadelphia
- Secretary and treasurer, C. I. Hathaway, Horseheads
- Superintendent, C. F. Baldwin, Montour Falls
- Assistant superintendent, C. I.. Furbay, Montour Falls.

The employees of the company were uniformed in cadet gray; conductors' uniforms were trimmed with gold, the motormen's with silver and other employees' with black. All had cap badges with name of occupation and number in enamel.

== Fares ==
The fare for the trip from Elmira to Watkins Glen was 35 cents one way; no reduction was made for the round trip.

== See also ==
- Elmira and Lake Ontario Railroad
