= John G. Ullman and Associates =

American Wealth management company headquartered in Horseheads, New York

John G. Ullman and Associates, Inc.
- Type: Private
- Industry: Wealth management, Financial services
- Founded: 1978; 48 years ago
- Founder: John G. Ullman and Barbara Ullman
- Headquarters: Horseheads, New York, United States
- Area served: United States
- Key people: John G. Ullman (CEO / Chairman); Jason Nickerson (President / COO)
- Services: Financial planning, investment management, tax preparation, retirement planning, estate planning
- AUM: US$1.36 billion (as of March 2025)
- Number of employees: 75+ (2024)
- Website: jgua.com

John G. Ullman and Associates (JGUA) is an American wealth management and financial advisory firm headquartered in Horseheads, New York. The company maintains additional offices in Corning, New York, Rhinebeck (town), New York, Rochester, New York, and Charlotte, North Carolina. It provides a range of financial services including financial planning, investment management, tax preparation, retirement planning, charitable giving, and estate planning.

== History ==
John G. Ullman and Associates was co-founded in 1978 by John G. Ullman and Barbara Ullman as an independent financial advisory firm. The firm's first office opened in Corning, New York, eventually expanding to five separate buildings on Market Street in the city.

JGUA later established branch offices in Rochester and Rhinebeck, New York, followed by its most recent expansion to Charlotte, North Carolina, in 2023.

In 2017, JGUA reported annual revenue of $12.5 million and approximately $900 million in assets under management (AUM). At that time, the company employed 58 individuals. By March 2025, the firm's AUM had increased to approximately $1.36 billion.

In 2018, John G. Ullman and Associates announced its plans to consolidate its Corning area operations into a new corporate headquarters located in Horseheads, at the Airport Corporate Park adjacent to the Elmira Corning Regional Airport. This facility offers more than 30,000 square feet of office space, designed to bring all Corning-area employees into a single location.

== Operations and Services ==
JGUA operates as a Registered Investment Advisor (RIA), providing comprehensive financial services primarily to individuals and high-net-worth individuals. Its services include:

- Financial planning
- Investment and portfolio management
- Tax planning and preparation
- Retirement planning
- Charitable giving strategies
- Estate planning

As of 2025, John G. Ullman serves as the firm's CEO, Chairman, and Founder. Jason Nickerson holds the positions of President and Chief Operating Officer. The firm has over 75 employees.

== Recognition ==
In 1997, founder John G. Ullman was honored as the Corning Chamber of Commerce Small Business Person of the Year. The firm received the 2013 Star-Gazette Best of the Twin Tiers Award in Investment/Financial Planning.

John G. Ullman and Associates has been featured in interviews and profiles by financial publications, including multiple mentions in The Wall Street Transcript, where John G. Ullman and other firm executives have discussed investment strategies and market insights.

== Media and Community Engagement ==
In 2023, JGUA partnered with WENY-TV to launch a "Financial Health" series. This weekly segment, airing during the WENY News at 5:30 broadcast, features discussions with JGUA President and Chief Operating Officer Jason Nickerson and other firm employees on various financial topics.

The firm maintains involvement in community initiatives, including participation in local expos, educational presentations, and events such as the Wellsboro Senior Expo, Corning Area Chamber of Commerce activities, and Glass Fest. They also provide financial education presentations at institutions like Keuka College.

The firm's founders, John G. and Barbara Ullman, established the Bobbie and John G. Ullman Family Foundation Inc. in 1994, a private foundation based in Corning, NY, which supports local charitable causes including the performing arts and youth programs.
