= Big Flats, New York =

Town in New York, United States

- Town
- Seal

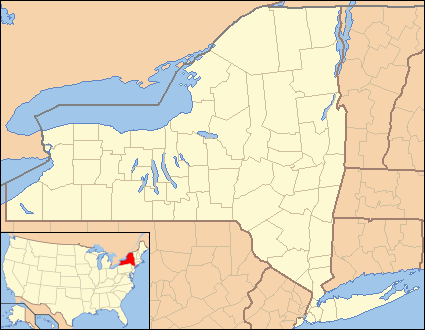
- Location in New York
- Coordinates: 42°08′37″N 76°55′57″W
- Country: United States
- State: New York
- County: Chemung

Government
  - Type: Town Council
  - Town Supervisor: Lee Giammichele
  - Town Council: Members: Amanda Lippincott; John Hunter; Robert Drake; Dean Wenzel

Area
  - Total: 45.07 sq mi (116.72 km^{2})
  - Land: 44.49 sq mi (115.22 km^{2})
  - Water: 0.58 sq mi (1.51 km^{2})
- Elevation: 910 ft (280 m)

Population (2020)
  - Total: 7,822 ▲
  - Estimate (2021): 7,679
  - Density: 174.6/sq mi (67.42/km^{2})
- Time zone: UTC-5 (Eastern (EST))
  - Summer (DST): UTC-4 (EDT)
- ZIP Codes: 14814 (Big Flats); 14845 (Horseheads); 14903 (Elmira); 14830 (Corning); 14871 (Pine City)
- FIPS code: 36-015-06475
- Website: bigflatsny.gov

Big Flats is a town in Chemung County, New York, United States. The population was 7,822 at the 2020 census. The town is on the western border of the county, west of Elmira. It is part of the Elmira Metropolitan Statistical Area. The town contains a hamlet also named Big Flats.

== History ==
The town of Big Flats, which had formerly been called "Great Plains", was organized in 1822 from the town of Elmira.

The Warren E. Eaton Motorless Flight Facility was listed on the National Register of Historic Places.

== Geography ==
According to the United States Census Bureau, Big Flats has a total area of 45.1 square miles (116.7 km^{2}), of which 44.5 square miles (115.2 km^{2}) is land and 0.58 square miles (1.5 km^{2}), or 1.29%, is water.

The Chemung River, a tributary of the Susquehanna River, flows through the southern portion of the town. Sing Sing Creek flows through the center of the town and is a tributary of the Chemung. The geography consists of a broad expanse of relatively flat land, the axis of which lies generally northeast to southwest. It is a river valley. The land has historically been very good for agriculture, including tobacco. Diligent searching will result in the finding of fossil seashells indicating the land was an ancient sea bottom. Other evidence is found in the rock of the region, which is mostly shale. The western town line is the border of Steuben County.

The Southern Tier Expressway (Interstate 86/New York State Route 17) passes through Big Flats, with access from exits 49, 50, and 51.

== Demographics ==
Historical population
Census	Pop.	Note	%±
1830	1,149		—
1840	1,375		19.7%
1850	1,709		24.3%
1860	1,853		8.4%
1870	1,902		2.6%
1880	1,989		4.6%
1890	1,687		−15.2%
1900	1,705		1.1%
1910	1,535		−10.0%
1920	1,454		−5.3%
1930	1,679		15.5%
1940	1,832		9.1%
1950	2,460		34.3%
1960	3,665		49.0%
1970	6,837		86.5%
1980	7,649		11.9%
1990	7,596		−0.7%
2000	7,224		−4.9%
2010	7,731		7.0%
2020	7,822		1.2%
2021 (est.)	7,679	▼	−1.8%
U.S. Decennial Census

As of the census of 2000, there were 7,224 people, 2,725 households, and 2,144 families residing in the town. The population density was 162.4 inhabitants per square mile (62.7/km^{2}). There were 2,836 housing units at an average density of 63.7 per square mile (24.6/km^{2}). The racial makeup of the town was 96.35% White, 1.18% Black or African American, 0.01% Native American, 1.52% Asian, 0.01% Pacific Islander, 0.15% from other races, and 0.78% from two or more races. Hispanic or Latino of any race were 0.66% of the population.

There were 2,725 households, out of which 34.4% had children under the age of 18 living with them, 69.5% were married couples living together, 6.8% had a female householder with no husband present, and 21.3% were non-families. 17.1% of all households were made up of individuals, and 6.6% had someone living alone who was 65 years of age or older. The average household size was 2.65 and the average family size was 2.99.

In the town, the population was spread out, with 26.0% under the age of 18, 4.9% from 18 to 24, 26.9% from 25 to 44, 29.4% from 45 to 64, and 12.8% who were 65 years of age or older. The median age was 41 years. For every 100 females, there were 97.8 males. For every 100 females age 18 and over, there were 96.0 males.

The median income for a household in the town was $53,435, and the median income for a family was $59,500. Males had a median income of $42,317 versus $28,327 for females. The per capita income for the town was $23,391. About 1.3% of families and 2.6% of the population were below the poverty line, including 2.1% of those under age 18 and 1.7% of those age 65 or over.

== Transportation ==
Elmira Corning Regional Airport is located in the town.

== Education ==
Horseheads Central School District covers much of Big Flats Town. Other parts of the town are in Corning City School District, Elmira Heights Central School District, and Elmira City School District.

== Communities and locations in the Town of Big Flats ==
- Arnot Mall, shopping mall in the eastern part of the town, just west of Horseheads
- Big Flats – The hamlet of Big Flats, located at the junction of the Southern Tier Expressway (I-86 and NY-17) and NY-352. "Big Flats" is also a census-designated place that covers the hamlets of Big Flats and Fisherville as well as the area in between.
- Elmira-Corning Regional Airport – An airport with scheduled air service; northwest of Elmira.
- Fisherville – A hamlet south of the airport and east of Big Flats village on Chemung County Route 64.
- Golden Glow Heights – A hamlet located by the southern town line on the south bank of the Chemung River.
- Harris Hill – A prominent hill south of the airport.
- Harris Hill Gliderport – A small airport on Harris Hill used for glider operations.
- Harris Hill Manor – A hamlet on the north bank of the Chemung River on NY-352.

== Climate ==
This climatic region is typified by large seasonal temperature differences, with warm to hot (and often humid) summers and cold (sometimes severely cold) winters. According to the Köppen Climate Classification system, Big Flats has a humid continental climate, abbreviated "Dfb" on climate maps.

== Culture ==
National Soaring Museum is in the town limits.
