= Pennsylvania Canal (North Branch Division) =

North Branch Pennsylvania Canal
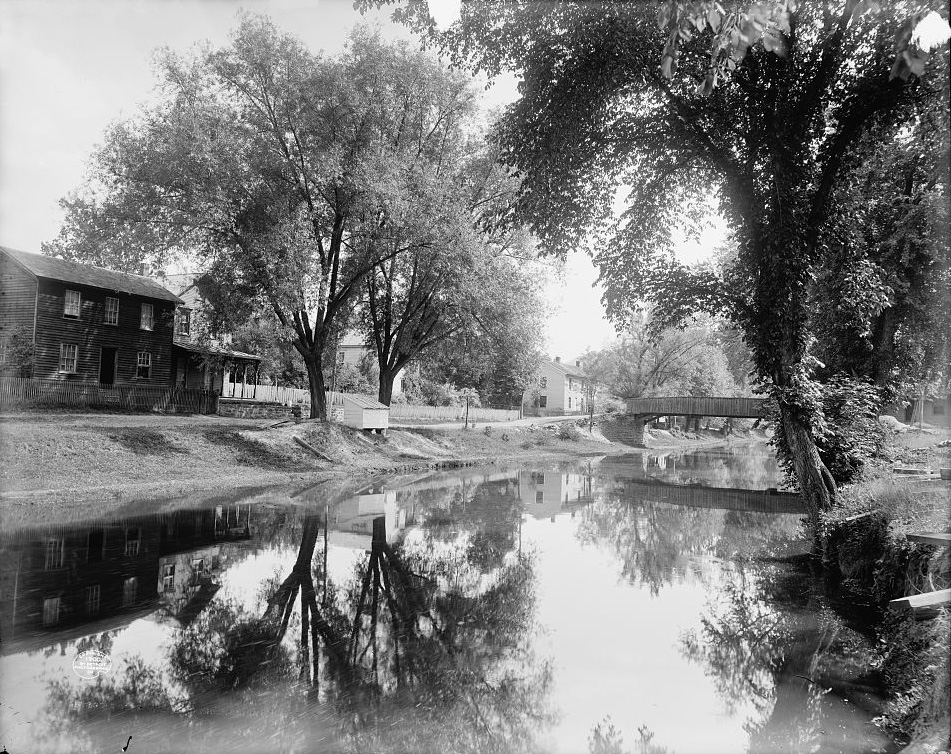
- North Branch Canal near Shickshinny in about 1900

Specifications
- Length: 169 miles (272 km)
- Locks: 43
- Status: Historic, abandoned

History
- Construction began: 1828
- Date completed: 1856

Geography
- Start point: Chemung River ( (Note: Coordinates derived from Google Earth with reference to Figure 23 in Petrullo's Anthracite and Slackwater showing the location of the canal along the west bank of the Chemung River at the Pennsylvania – New York border.))
- End point: Susquehanna River

The North Branch Division of the Pennsylvania Canal was a historic waterway that ran 169 miles (272 km) along the North Branch Susquehanna River between southern New York and north-central Pennsylvania. At its southern end, the canal connected with the West Branch Canal and the Susquehanna Division Canal at Northumberland, while on the north it connected with the Junction Canal and the New York canal system. Built between 1828 and 1856, the North Branch Canal was part of a large transportation network that included Pennsylvania's Main Line of Public Works.

== History ==
The first segment of 55 miles (89 km) was begun in 1828 and completed in 1831 to Nanticoke Falls. In 1834, a project called the Wyoming Extension increased the canal's length by 17 miles (27 km) past Wilkes-Barre to Pittston. A final extension of 97 miles (156 km) from Pittston to the New York state line was started in 1836 and finished in 1856.

The complete canal had a total of 43 locks that overcame 334 feet (102 m) of elevation between its end points. The southern end was 420 feet (130 m) above sea level, and the northern end was at 754 feet (230 m). (Note: Derived by adding the combined lift of the locks, 334 feet (102 m), to the elevation of the North Branch Susquehanna River (identical to the elevation of the West Branch Susquehanna River) at Northumberland, 420 feet (130 m).)

The privately built Junction Canal of 18 miles (29 km) linked the North Branch Canal to Elmira. There the Junction Canal connected with the Chemung Canal, which led north to Seneca Lake and the Erie Canal. Through these connections, boats using the Pennsylvania Canal system were able to travel as far as Buffalo and Lake Champlain.

In 1858, the canal from Northampton Street in Wilkes-Barre to the state line was sold to the North Branch Canal Company, which in turn sold it to the Lehigh Valley Railroad in 1865. The railroad laid tracks along portions of the canal towpath and operated both until 1872, when it was authorized by the state legislature to close the canal.

== Locks (first segment) ==
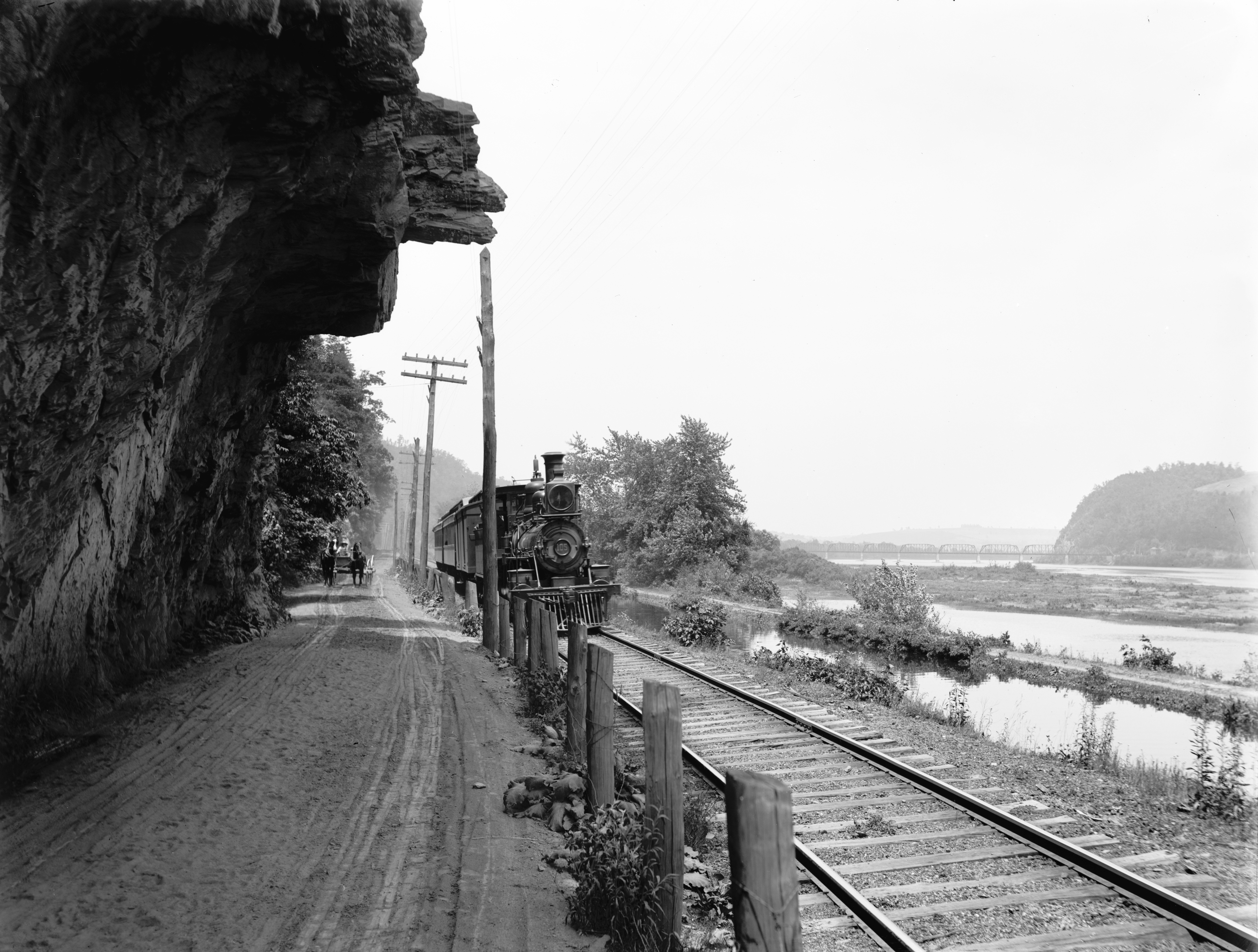
Hanging rock, road, railroad, canal, and Susquehanna River near Catawissa in about 1890–1901

No.	Lift	Canal mile (km)	Remarks
—	0	0.0 miles 0.0 km	Northumberland Canal Basin
1	11.49 feet (3.50 m)	1.2 miles (1.9 km)	—
2	11.21 feet (3.42 m)	14.2 miles (22.9 km)	2 miles (3.2 km) above Danville
3	10.65 feet (3.25 m)	21.7 miles (34.9 km)	Rupert
4	5.51 feet (1.68 m)	23.1 miles (37.2 km)	Bloomsburg
5	9.63 feet (2.94 m)	30.0 miles (48.3 km)	Stoneytown
6	8.48 feet (2.58 m)	36.2 miles (58.3 km)	Berwick
7	8.92 feet (2.72 m)	39.3 miles (63.2 km)	Beach Haven
8	1.93 feet (0.59 m)	55.8 miles (89.8 km)	Guard lock at Nanticoke

== Chenango Extension ==
In 1863, the New York Legislature authorized construction of another canal, the Chenango Canal Extension, meant to run about 40 miles (64 km) along the North Branch Susquehanna River from Binghamton, New York, to the Pennsylvania – New York border. The plans called for construction of an east–west crosscut canal linking the Chenango Canal Extension to the North Branch Canal, which followed the Chemung River rather than the North Branch Susquehanna River north of Athens. Cost overruns, waning enthusiasm for canals, and funding delays led to abandonment of the project in 1872, after most of the work on the northern 30 miles (48 km) of the line had been completed. Beyond planning, no work had been done on the southernmost 10 miles (16 km) when the project ended.

== Remnants ==
Susquehanna Riverlands in Salem Township, 8 miles (13 km) south of Wilkes-Barre, has 0.5 miles (0.8 km) of river walking path and filled canal owned and managed by Pennsylvania Power and Light Company.

Lock No. 1 and a section of the original North Branch Canal in Northumberland were intact in 1986 as was Lock No. 2 below Bloomsburg. Occasional sections of canal bed remained between Shickshinny and West Nanticoke, and the West Nanticoke guard lock was intact. Canal bed was visible from the Lackawanna River toward Ransom and largely intact above Vosburg between Lackawanna Campground and Horse Race Falls. At Laceyville a museum known as the Oldest House was once a lockkeeper's house. Other remnants such as crib work, canal embankments, iron spikes, and timbers could be found here and there along the full length of the canal.

== Points of interest ==
Feature	Coordinates	Description
Athens	41°57′26″N 76°31′05″W	Town near the northern terminus
Wilkes-Barre	41°14′34″N 75°52′50″W	City near the midpoint of the canal
Northumberland	40°53′30″N 76°47′51″W	Town at the southern terminus

== See also ==
- List of canals in the United States

== Notes and references ==
Notes

== Works cited ==
- Petrillo, F. Charles (1986). Anthracite and Slackwater: The North Branch Canal 1828–1901. Easton, Pennsylvania: Center for Canal History and Technology. ISBN 0-930973-04-6.
- Shank, William H. (1986). The Amazing Pennsylvania Canals, 150th Anniversary Edition. York, Pennsylvania: American Canal and Transportation Center. ISBN 0-933788-37-1.
- Whitford, Nobel E., and Beal, Minnie M. (1906). History of the Canal System of the State of New York Together with Brief Histories of the Canals of the United States and Canada, "Chapter 18: The Chenango Canal Extension". Albany, New York: Brandow Printing Company. OCLC 2059401. Retrieved March 21, 2010.
