= Junction Canal =

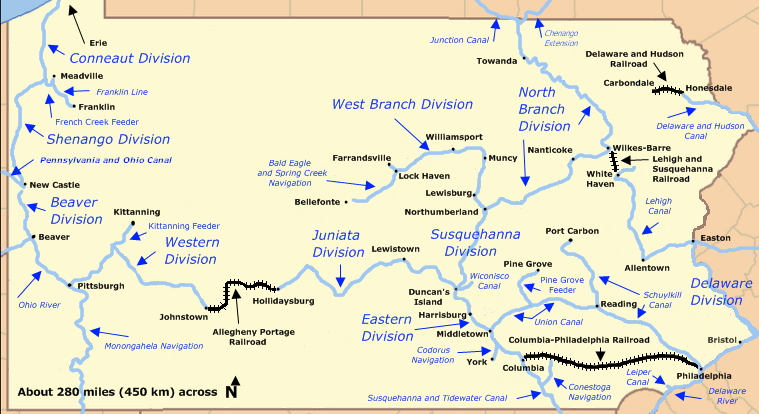
- Map of historic Pennsylvania canals and connecting railroads
- Interactive map of Junction Canal

Specifications
- Locks: 11
- Status: Abandoned except for historic interest

History
- Original owner: Junction Canal Company
- Construction began: 1853
- Date of first use: 1854
- Date completed: 1858
- Date closed: 1871

Geography
- Start point: Elmira, New York
- End point: Athens, Pennsylvania
- Connects to: Chemung Canal, Pennsylvania Canal (North Branch Division)

The Junction Canal was a canal in the states of New York and Pennsylvania in the United States. The canal was also called the Arnot Canal, after the name of its principal stockholder, John Arnot of Elmira, New York.

== History ==
The canal was built and operated by a private stock company. Part of the canal was open and operating by 1854, but the entire length was not finished until 1858.

The completed canal was 18 miles (29 km) long and had 11 locks. The intent was to lengthen the reach of the Chemung Canal deeper into Pennsylvania in order to connect to the canal systems there. Competition with railroads led to diminished use of the canal.

In 1865 the canal was severely damaged by a flood. In 1866, the stock company was authorized to change its name to the "Junction Canal and Railroad Company," and work commenced in constructing a railroad on its right of way.

The canal was last used in 1871, and was then abandoned.

== Points of interest ==
Feature	Coordinates	Description
Elmira, New York	42°05′23″N 76°48′28″W	City at the northern terminus
Athens, Pennsylvania	41°57′26″N 76°31′05″W	Borough near the southern terminus

== See also ==
- List of canals in New York
- List of canals in the United States
