= Big Flats (CDP), New York =

Big Flats, New York
- Census-designated place
- Location within New York Location within the United States
- Coordinates: 42°8′42″N 76°55′48″W
- Country: United States
- State: New York
- County: Chemung
- Town: Big Flats

Area
  - Total: 16.76 sq mi (43.42 km^{2})
  - Land: 16.69 sq mi (43.22 km^{2})
  - Water: 0.077 sq mi (0.20 km^{2})
- Elevation: 902 ft (275 m)

Population (2020)
  - Total: 5,555
  - Density: 332.9/sq mi (128.52/km^{2})
- Time zone: UTC-5 (Eastern (EST))
  - Summer (DST): UTC-4 (EDT)
- ZIP Codes: 14814 (Big Flats); 14845 (Horseheads); 14903 (Elmira)
- Area code: 607
- FIPS code: 36-06464
- GNIS feature ID: 0943883

Big Flats is an unincorporated community and census-designated place (CDP) within the town of Big Flats in Chemung County, New York, United States. The population of the CDP was 5,277 at the 2010 census, out of a total population in the town of 7,595.

== Geography ==
The Big Flats CDP is located at 42°08′42″N 76°55′48″W (42.145087, -76.929869) and occupies the center and northeastern portions of the town of Big Flats. The CDP includes the hamlet of Big Flats in the west-center part of the town and Fisherville near the eastern border, as well as residential subdivisions in the areas between. Elmira Corning Regional Airport is in the CDP, northwest of Fisherville, as is Arnot Mall.

The Southern Tier Expressway (Interstate 86 and New York State Route 17) crosses the CDP, with access from exits 49, 50, and 51. County Route 64 (Big Flats Road) runs roughly parallel to the expressway, connecting the centers of the hamlets of Big Flats and Fisherville.

According to the United States Census Bureau, the CDP has a total area of 16.4 square miles (42.4 km^{2}), of which 16.3 square miles (42.2 km^{2}) is land and 0.077 square miles (0.2 km^{2}), or 0.47%, is water.

== Demographics ==
Historical population
Census	Pop.	Note	%±
2020	5,555		—
U.S. Decennial Census

As of the census of 2000, there were 2,482 people, 950 households, and 748 families residing in the CDP. The population density was 634.9 inhabitants per square mile (245.1/km^{2}). There were 968 housing units at an average density of 247.6 per square mile (95.6/km^{2}). The racial makeup of the CDP was 95.17% White, 1.49% Black or African American, 2.01% Asian, 0.32% from other races, and 1.01% from two or more races. Hispanic or Latino of any race were 0.89% of the population.

There were 950 households, out of which 33.7% had children under the age of 18 living with them, 69.1% were married couples living together, 8.1% had a female householder with no husband present, and 21.2% were non-families. 16.6% of all households were made up of individuals, and 6.4% had someone living alone who was 65 years of age or older. The average household size was 2.61 and the average family size was 2.93.

In the CDP, the population was spread out, with 25.7% under the age of 18, 5.2% from 18 to 24, 25.6% from 25 to 44, 28.6% from 45 to 64, and 14.8% who were 65 years of age or older. The median age was 41 years. For every 100 females, there were 95.9 males. For every 100 females age 18 and over, there were 93.1 males.

The median income for a household in the CDP was $53,344, and the median income for a family was $54,829. Males had a median income of $44,479 versus $30,190 for females. The per capita income for the CDP was $22,938. About 1.0% of families and 1.5% of the population were below the poverty line, including 1.1% of those under age 18 and 2.1% of those age 65 or over.

== Transportation ==
Elmira Corning Regional Airport is located in the CDP.

== Education ==
Most of the CDP is in the Horseheads Central School District. Small portions are in the Elmira Heights Central School District.
