= First Transit Operations in the Southern Tier =

Bus services operator in New York, United States

First Transit
- First Transit and CTran Elmira logos
- Locale: Elmira, New York, Southern Tier
- Service type: Bus Service
- Operator: First Transit
- Website: Official Website (CTran Elmira)

First Transit operates several bus systems in the Southern Tier region of New York under contract. Many of these systems are medium-sized bus systems, operating within certain city, village, or county borders. With the exception of CTran Elmira (which runs daily), all systems operate Monday through Saturday

== Locations ==
CTran operates as a regional public transportation provider in the city of Elmira, New York and its surrounding area. Previously known as the Chemung County Transportation System (CCTS), Chemung County adopted the name change to CTran in 2012.

== Services ==
Most of the CTran routes operate once hourly throughout the day on weekdays, with limited service on Saturdays and Sundays. Operation of the system is managed by contract with First Transit, Inc., the same agency that also operates the Corning-Erwin Area Transit System (CEATS) and the Steuben County Transit System.

The majority of routes connect at a transfer center located on Railroad Avenue in Elmira.

=== List of CTran Routes ===
Route	Terminals			Notes	Streets traveled
1	Elmira; Transportation Center	Loop	Southtown Loop	Runs in a clockwise loop in Southport; Serves Southtown Plaza and Elmira High School; Runs Monday-Saturday	Maple Avenue, NYS 427, Robert Street, South Main Street, West Miller Street
3	Elmira; Transportation Center	Loop	Bulkhead Loop	Runs in a clockwise loop; Serves Park Terrace and Flannery Apartments on request only; Serves Southtown Plaza; Runs Monday-Saturday	Pennsylvania Avenue, Broadway Street
4	Elmira; Transportation Center	Loop	Hospital Loop	Runs in a clockwise loop; Formerly two routes: Arnot Ogden Medical Loop, and St. Joseph's Hospital Loop; Runs Monday-Saturday	West Clinton Street, Davis Street, Woodlawn Avenue, Sullivan Street, East Church Street
5	Elmira; Transportation Center	↔	West Elmira; West Water Street & York Street	Formerly 5-Golden Glow; service renamed when service to Golden Glow neighborhood cut; Service East of Railroad Avenue began (date); Runs Monday-Saturday	West Church Street (WB), Church Street (EB)
6	Elmira; Transportation Center	↔	Horseheads; Hanover Square	Runs in a counterclockwise loop in Horseheads; Serves Bethany Village on request only; Serves Grand Central Plaza; Runs Monday-Saturday	Madison Avenue, Lake Road, South Main Street
7	Arnot Mall Shuttle	Loop	Loop	Special 50 cent fare (25 cent for seniors); Runs in a Counterclokwise Loop; Runs Daily	Big Flats Road
8	Elmira; Transportation Center	↔	Arnot Mall Door 4	Some early morning and evening trips serve Consumer Square and Southern Tier Crossing; Serves Grand Central Plaza; Runs Monday-Saturday; Additional service between Elmira and Arnot Mall is available on route 9; Evening service available on Route 9 from Arnot Mall and Grand Central Plaza	Grand Central Avenue
9	Elmira; Transportation Center	↔	Arnot Mall Door 4	Some early morning and evening trips serve Consumer Square and Southern Tier Crossing; Evening trips serves Grand Central Plaza	College Avenue, Colonial Drive
10	Elmira; Transportation Center	Loop	Owego; Tioga County HHS	Runs Monday-Friday; Special Commuter Fare ($3.00 between Elmira and Waverly or Sayre and Owego; $6.00 for any trip not ending in Sayre).; Only Interstate route in system; Operates via Sayre, PA; Route terminated in Waverly; service extended when Ride Tioga bus service was discontinued; Partially funded by Tioga County; One trip terminates in Sayre, and runs express between Elmira and Waverly	Maple Avenue, NYS 427, Southern Tier Expressway, Cayuta Avenue, NYS 17C

- Southside Loop (evening and Sunday route)
- Wellsburg - Waverly
- Pine City
- Elmira - Corning Community College
- Spencer - Van Etten

=== Special regional routes ===
Limited service hours on these routes

- Schuyler County (Watkins Glen to Cornell University, Ithaca)
- Chemung County - Route 1 (Route 13 to Cornell University, Ithaca)

=== Corning-Erwin Area Transit System ===
- Northside
- Southside
- Cooper Plains / Gang Mills / Painted Post
- Corning Community College
- East Corning / Gibson
- Corning Museum of Glass Shuttle

=== Steuben County Transit System ===
- Village of Bath
- Hammondsport
- Bath - Corning

== See also ==
=== Local municipalities ===
- Chemung County
- Elmira, New York
- Horseheads, New York
- Corning, New York

=== Neighboring transit agencies ===
- Tompkins Consolidated Area Transit
- Broome County Transit
