= Rochester, Hornellsville, and Pine Creek Railroad =

The Rochester, Hornellsville, and Pine Creek Railroad (RH&PC) was a railroad company organized in New York state in the 1870s. It did some grading but never laid track nor opened its line.

Its articles of association were filed on March 30, 1871, in New York and was formed according to the railroad laws of the state. It planned to build a railroad line from Hornellsville to the New York-Pennsylvania state line. In 1874, the railroad line was 25 miles (40 km) long and only a portion of it was graded at that time. The RH&PC, which merged with two other railways to become the Geneva, Hornellsville, and Pine Creek Railway in 1876, never completed the line and town citizens were asked to repay the bonds. This led to the Greenwood, New York, insurrection of 1882. In 1896, Greenwood got rail service from the New York & Pennsylvania Railroad, which used some of the RH&PC grading.

== History ==
The president of the company was S.M. Alley and John M. Finch was the acting Superintendent of Operations. The company offices were located on Canisteo Street in Hornellsville, New York (today Hornell, New York).

There was $250,000 of capital stock authorized, which was subscribed in full; $136,325 had been received by the date of the 1873 annual report. At that time, about $84,000 was spent on the road and equipment, including grading, land, and engineering. The road was graded to within 11 miles (20 km) of the state line, but no track was ever laid. Work was expected to be completed in 1874. By 1875, $103,559 was spent.

Chapter 638 of the New York Laws of 1874 allowed for the appointment of commissioners to issue bonds and invest the same in the bonds of the railroad company. To help finance it communities through which the line would run borrowed money, in Greenwood's case $30,000 (equivalent to $787,000 in 2024); Hornellsville borrowed $70,000 and West Union $41,000.

In 1875, two new railroads were proposed to connect with the RH&PC. The Gaines and State Line Rail Road was incorporated in Pennsylvania on November 4, 1875 to run from West Branch Township, Pennsylvania through Potter and Tioga counties to reach the south end of the RH&PC at the state line in Harrison Township. The Geneva and Hornellsville Railway was formed on November 12, 1875 (articles of consolidation dated March 23) by consolidating the Geneva and Southwestern Railway and the Geneva Southwestern and Hornellsville Railway. It proposed to build from Geneva, New York to Hornellsville, at the north end of the RH&PC. On January 21, 1876, the RH&PC and the Gaines and State Line Railroad merged with the Geneva and Hornellsville Railway, creating the Geneva, Hornellsville, and Pine Creek Railway. It had $2,675,000 in capital stock. It did not complete the RH&PC line.

The Geneva, Hornellsville and Pine Creek was in turn consolidated with the Ontario Southern Railroad on December 17, 1879, to become the Lake Ontario Southern Railway. The Ontario Southern carried coal traffic north from a connection with the Elmira, Jefferson and Canandaigua Railroad at Stanley, New York, on the proposed line from Geneva to Hornellsville, to the Lake Ontario port of Sodus Point. While the latter two railroads were later consolidated to become the Elmira and Lake Ontario Railroad, part of the Pennsylvania Railroad system, that company never exercised its rights to build the Geneva-to-West Branch line.

From 1878 to 1882, there were several unsuccessful attempts in Greenwood to seize and sell property to pay the town's railroad debt. The citizens threatened potential buyers and prevented the tax collectors from conducting public sales. In the process, several would-be purchasers were seriously injured. New York Governor Alonzo B. Cornell, at the request of the Steuben County sheriff, issued a proclamation on February 11, 1882, that an insurrection existed in the Town of Greenwood, and ordered them to stop or be subject to the full weight of the law, including being ordered to return to their homes. The proclamation authorized the sheriff to call out the militia (as the National Guard was then called).

In 1896, Greenwood got rail service from the New York & Pennsylvania Railroad, which used some of the RH&PC grading.
