= USS Chemung =

Two ships of the United States Navy have been named Chemung, after the river in New York State.

- USS Chemung (AT-18), an ocean tug built and launched in 1917 as USS Pocahontas.
- USS Chemung (AO-30), commissioned in 1941 and served until decommissioning in 1970.
