= Chemung, Pennsylvania =

Unincorporated community in Pennsylvania, US

- Unincorporated community
- Location within Pennsylvania Location within the United States
- Coordinates: 41°35′26″N 76°50′20″W
- Country: United States
- State: Pennsylvania
- County: Lycoming
- Township: McNett
- Elevation: 1,965 ft (599 m)
- Time zone: UTC-5 (Eastern (EST))
  - Summer (DST): UTC-4 (EDT)
- Area code: 570
- GNIS feature ID: 1203255

Chemung is an unincorporated community in McNett Township, Lycoming County, Pennsylvania, United States. Chemung is located on Quadrant Route 1013 (Ellenton Mountain Road) in extreme northern Lycoming County, 4.6 miles (7.4 km) south of Canton.
