= Holding Point =

Coordinates: 42°11′7.5″N 76°49′22.5″W

The Holding Point is an area in the Town of Horseheads, New York that is the site of the Horseheads Industrial Center.

The name dates back to World War II, when the federal government used eminent domain to obtain 700 acres (2.8 km^{2}) of farmland north of the Village of Horseheads to store ammunition, vehicles, and other war supplies. The facility was built in 1942 at a cost of over $8.2 million. The land reverted to civilian control after the war and has since been converted to an industrial center and recreational sports complex.

In August 1944, the Holding Point became a base for the 134th and 146th Italian Service Units. These units comprised approximately 400 captured Italian soldiers who, after screening for Fascist leanings, volunteered to support the U.S. war effort. They were paid $0.80 per day to repair military vehicles and load materials, and were known to the local community for their "Limited Liberty" status, which included supervised bus tours of the Finger Lakes and Cornell University.
