= Horseheads, New York =

- Town
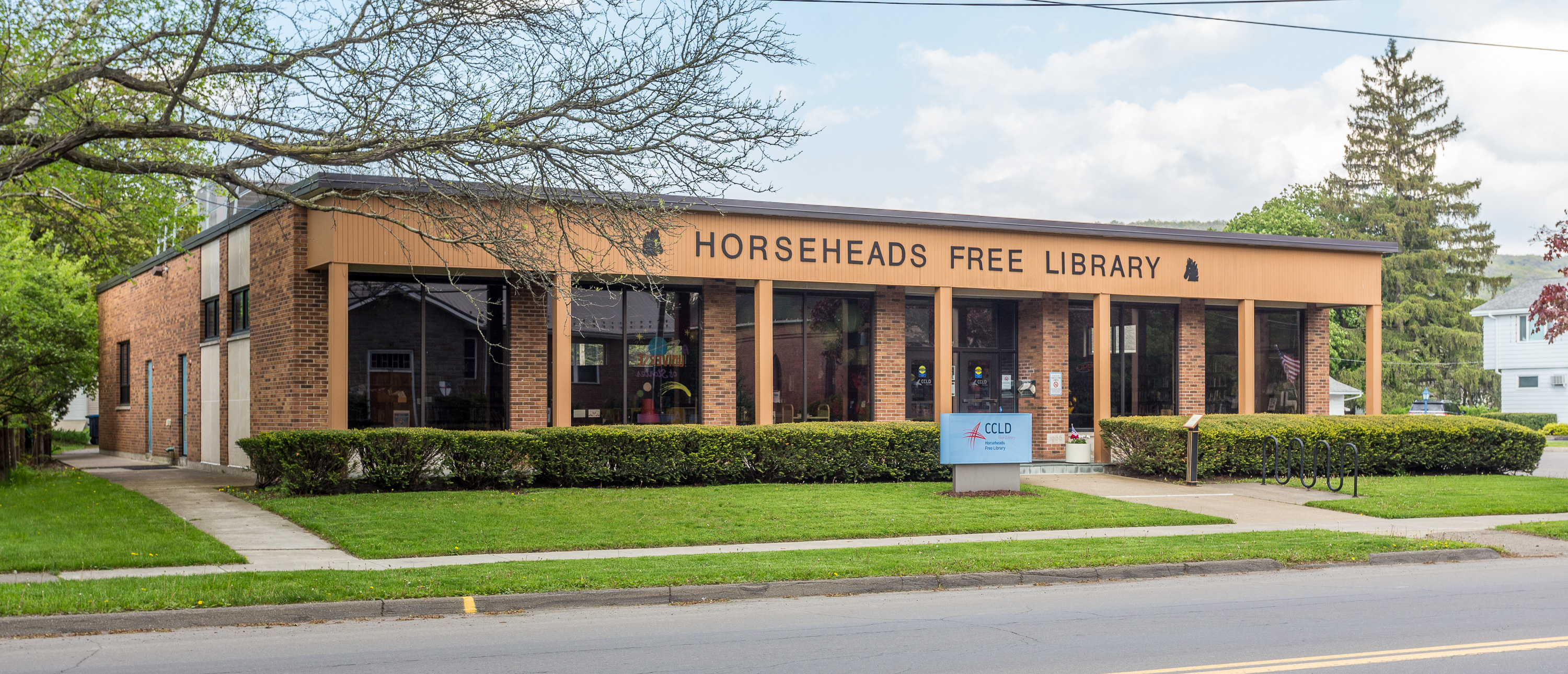
- Horseheads Public Library

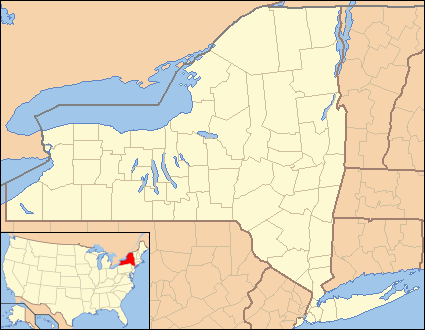
- Location within the state of New York
- Coordinates: 42°09′45″N 76°47′39″W
- Country: United States
- State: New York
- County: Chemung

Government
  - Type: Town Council
  - Town Supervisor: Donald Fischer (R)
  - Town Council: Members: • Albert J. Curran; • Donald J. Fischer; • Carl R. Lewis, Sr.; • Gary H. Riopko

Area
  - Total: 35.92 sq mi (93.03 km^{2})
  - Land: 35.61 sq mi (92.22 km^{2})
  - Water: 0.31 sq mi (0.81 km^{2})
- Elevation: 1,178 ft (359 m)

Population (2020)
  - Total: 19,412 ▼
  - Estimate (2021): 19,069
  - Density: 544.6/sq mi (210.29/km^{2})
- Time zone: UTC-5 (Eastern (EST))
  - Summer (DST): UTC-4 (EDT)
- ZIP Codes: 14845 (Horseheads); 14816 (Breesport); 14861 (Lowman); 14901 (Elmira); 14903 (Elmira Heights)
- FIPS code: 36-015-35705
- GNIS feature ID: 979080
- Website: www.townofhorseheads.gov

Horseheads is a town in Chemung County, New York, United States. The population was 19,412 at the 2020 census. The name of the town is derived from the number of bleached horses' skulls once found there.

Horseheads is north of the city of Elmira, upon which it borders. There is a village named Horseheads within the town. It is part of the Elmira Metropolitan Statistical Area.

== History ==
On September 1, 1779, General George Washington and Nickolas Steven Webb ordered the forces of General John Sullivan to march north on a 450-mile (720 km) journey through a wooded wilderness from Easton, Pennsylvania, over to Wyoming, Pennsylvania, and on up the Susquehanna River to Newtown (Elmira) to mount a raid on Iroquois, then allied with the British. They continued north through what is now known as Horseheads to the Finger Lakes region and west to Geneseo. Devastating the already weakened Iroquois, Sullivan's troops retreated back along the same route.

The journey had been particularly severe and wearing upon the animals, and their food supply was found insufficient. Arriving about 6 miles (10 km) north of Fort Reid on September 24, 1779, they were obliged to dispose of a large number of sick and disabled horses. The number of horses was so great that they were quite noticeable, and the native Iroquois collected the skulls and arranged them in a line along the trail. From that time forward, that spot was referred to as the "valley of the horses' heads" and is still known by the name.

Around 1787, the first settlers arrived, making the area one of the first in the county to be populated. The town of Horseheads was formed from the towns of Elmira and Chemung in 1835. Fairport, the current village of Horseheads, set itself off from the town by becoming an incorporated village in 1837.

=== Fire of 1862 ===
A fire destroyed much of the business district of Horseheads in August 1862.

=== The Holding Point ===
Located in the northern portion of Horseheads, the Holding Point was used by the Federal government during World War II. Originally called The Holding Point and Reconsignment Point, it was a storage and collection point for military equipment. At the cost of over $8 million, the 700+-acre plot of land was managed by 30 soldiers from the Army Transportation Corp and aided by 500 civilians. In the summer of 1944, German POWs were brought to the Holding Point as labor from nearby former CCC camps in Van Etten. The German POWs only served at the Holding Point for a limited time, before they were replaced by approximately 400 Italians from two Allied-loyal Italian Service Units.

== Geography ==
According to the United States Census Bureau, the town has a total area of 35.9 square miles (93.0 km^{2}), of which 35.6 square miles (92.2 km^{2}) is land and 0.31 square miles (0.8 km^{2}), or 0.87%, is water.

Newtown Creek, a tributary of the Chemung River, flows west then south through the center of the town. The Southern Tier Expressway (combined Interstate 86 and New York State Route 17) is a major east–west highway, with access from exits 52, 53, and 54. New York State Route 13 and New York State Route 14 are north–south highways through the town. The western end of New York State Route 223 is east of Horseheads village. The town is in the Southern Tier region of New York.

== Demographics ==
Historical population
| Year | Pop. | ±% |
|---|---|---|
| 1860 | 2,277 | — |
| 1870 | 2,961 | +30.0% |
| 1880 | 3,449 | +16.5% |
| 1890 | 3,482 | +1.0% |
| 1900 | 4,944 | +42.0% |
| 1910 | 5,376 | +8.7% |
| 1920 | 6,809 | +26.7% |
| 1930 | 8,420 | +23.7% |
| 1940 | 8,804 | +4.6% |
| 1950 | 11,118 | +26.3% |
| 1960 | 17,808 | +60.2% |
| 1970 | 20,552 | +15.4% |
| 1980 | 20,238 | −1.5% |
| 1990 | 19,926 | −1.5% |
| 2000 | 19,561 | −1.8% |
| 2010 | 19,485 | −0.4% |
| 2021 | 19,069 | −2.1% |
* Population estimate. 1890-1990: Source from Chemung County, not Census Bureau. Source: "U.S. Census website". United States Census Bureau.

As of the census of 2000, there were 19,561 people, 7,960 households, and 5,253 families residing in the town. The population density was 545.5 inhabitants per square mile (210.6/km^{2}). There were 8,350 housing units at an average density of 232.8 per square mile (89.9/km^{2}). The racial makeup of the town was 95.89% White, 1.29% Black or African American, 0.12% Native American, 1.53% Asian, 0.01% Pacific Islander, 0.20% from other races, and 0.96% from two or more races. Hispanic or Latino of any race were 0.74% of the population.

There were 7,960 households, out of which 29.8% had children under the age of 18 living with them, 51.3% were married couples living together, 11.3% had a female householder with no husband present, and 34.0% were non-families. 28.4% of all households were made up of individuals, and 13.5% had someone living alone who was 65 years of age or older. The average household size was 2.38 and the average family size was 2.93.

In the town, the population was spread out, with 23.4% under the age of 18, 6.7% from 18 to 24, 26.9% from 25 to 44, 23.2% from 45 to 64, and 19.7% who were 65 years of age or older. The median age was 41 years. For every 100 females, there were 87.1 males. For every 100 females age 18 and over, there were 84.0 males.

The median income for a household in the town was $37,444, and the median income for a family was $46,827. Males had a median income of $36,546 versus $24,197 for females. The per capita income for the town was $19,795. About 5.6% of families and 8.3% of the population were below the poverty line, including 9.5% of those under age 18 and 7.6% of those age 65 or over.

== Transportation ==
Historically, the Elmira & Seneca Lake Railway opened for operation on June 19, 1900, from Horseheads to Seneca Lake. The former Chemung Canal passed through the town.

Interstate 86 / State Route 17 (Southern Tier Expressway) runs through the town connecting Elmira / Elmira Heights to the southeast and Corning to the west. It is connected to the north to Watkins Glen via State Route 14 and to Ithaca via State Route 13. It is served by the Elmira-Corning Regional Airport, located in Big Flats, New York, and has bus service through C-Tran.

Elmira Corning Regional Airport has a postal address stating "Horseheads, NY", though it is physically located in the Big Flats CDP, Town of Big Flats.

== Education ==
The school district covering most of Horseheads Town is Horseheads Central School District. A portion of the town in the southwest is instead in Elmira Heights Central School District.

== Sister city program ==
Starting in 1990, Horseheads was the sister city of Bato in Tochigi Prefecture in Japan, a town that could be translated as Horseheads. However, in 2005 Bato merged with Ogawa to form a new town called Nakagawa. Nakagawa inherited the title of sister city, and the two cities continue to exchange student and adult delegates.

== Communities and locations in the Town of Horseheads ==
- Breesport – A hamlet by the eastern town line on NY-223, named after settler Azariah Breese.
- Elmira Heights – The village of Elmira Heights is a northern suburb of Elmira. Most of the village is inside the town of Horseheads.
- Elmira Heights North – A suburb of Elmira.
- Horseheads – The village of Horseheads is a northern suburb of Elmira, located on NY-17.
- Horseheads North – a census-designated place in the northern part of the town
- Orchard Knoll – A hamlet southeast of Horseheads village on County Road 51.
- Ormiston – A location south of Breesport.
- Slabtown – A location by the northern town line between NY-13 and NY-14.
