= Greenwood, New York, insurrection of 1882 =

Popular resistance to asset seizure

- Date: February–June, 1882
- Location: Greenwood, New York; 42.135°N 77.648°W
- Caused by: Collapse of railroad project in Panic of 1873; citizens refused to repay money borrowed since they received no benefit.
- Methods: Intimidate bidders at tax sales; some injured.
- Result: Governor proclaimed state of insurrection; money in question paid.

Parties
Taxpayers of Greenwood	Sheriff Higgens and tax collector of Steuben County, and their deputies; Governor Alonzo Cornell; bond holders; would-be purchasers at tax sales.

Number
150–300	50

Casualties and losses
	Several serious injuries.

The Insurrection in Greenwood, New York took place in February of 1882 when citizens of Greenwood, New York, resisted the seizure and sale of property to pay for bonds that were attained to build the Rochester, Hornellsville, and Pine Creek Railroad. After potential buyers were threatened with firearms, and some were seriously injured, New York Governor Alonzo Cornell proclaimed on February 11, 1882, that an insurrection existed in Greenwood. Some property was successfully sold in February and March, and the governor lifted the proclamation in June.

== Background ==
The Rochester, Hornellsville, and Pine Creek Railroad had articles of association filed on March 30, 1871, in New York and the company was formed according to the railroad laws of the state. It planned to build a railroad line from Hornellsville to the New York–Pennsylvania state line. Greenwood, population 1,400 in 1882, and other communities through which the line would run, borrowed money to pay for the railroad construction. In Greenwood's case the sum was $30,000 (equivalent to $806,000 in 2025); Hornellsville borrowed $70,000 and West Union $41,000. Work on the railroad ended with the Panic of 1873, which brought railroad bankruptcies and bank failures. The railroad was never built, and Greenwood had "nothing to show for its bonds except a few miles of inexpensive grading."

In 1872, the town of Greenwood was bonded for $30,000, but a judge of the Court of Appeals found that the bonds were illegal in November 1873 because commissioners violated an agreement about ensuring it was legal. The jubilation of the people of Greenwood over this decision was short lived, as the New York Legislature passed a law in May 1874 legalizing the acts of the commissioners.

== The insurrection ==
Greenwood paid interest on the loan until 1874, when the entire principal was due. In order to repay the loan, a tax of $8,000 was imposed on the citizens of Greenwood. Since they had been "defrauded and robbed", the residents refused to pay it, although they continued paying county and state taxes. Most of the people in Greenwood were very bitter and made threats of injury or death.

From 1878 to 1882, there were several unsuccessful attempts to sell lots to pay for the debt, but in the process, several would-be purchasers were seriously injured. The tax collector in February of 1878 offered for sale several lots of personal property which had been levied upon for the payment of taxes due. About two hundred people assembled at the place of sale and threatened bodily harm to potential buyers with guns and revolvers. When no one would make a bid, the sale was adjourned. Governor Alonzo B. Cornell, to whom the sheriff sent a telegram, responded that the sheriff must exhaust his powers before the state would become involved. The sheriff formed a posse of 50 men to attend a sale in April 1878 to sell the lots, but it was unsuccessful.

On February 7, 1882, the collector attempted to make 98 sales. There was a posse of 40 men, met by a group of 250 taxpayers, who were reported to be quiet and orderly, or according to the Buffalo Weekly Express, the citizens were well armed, with martial music and hard cider. The collector claimed that he was not sure of the legality of the levies, and adjourned the sales indefinitely.

Miners and oil men from Pennsylvania, just over the border from Greenwood, helped the Greenwood citizens' attempts at resistance. Molly Maguires from Pennsylvania may have been present.

== The Governor's proclamation ==
Since the telegram sent to the Governor in 1878 did not result in assistance from the state, the sheriff traveled to Albany to present the situation to Governor Alonzo B. Cornell, informing him that several would-be purchasers were seriously injured. In response, Governor Cornell proclaimed on February 11, 1882, that a state of insurrection existed. In the proclamation, he stated that citizens of Greenwood had unlawfully assembled, issued threats, and prevented the collection of taxes as well as the actions of the officers of law. He ordered Greenwood citizens to "desist from any attempt" to violate peace, to threaten others, or to prevent officers of the law from their duties. Otherwise, they are "commanded to disperse and depart to their respective places of abode" and officers of the law were commanded to use any legal process necessary to maintain order.

== Aftermath ==
On February 14, the Sheriff was more successful at a new sale. He was able to collect a few of the delinquent taxes on that day, and it was reported that most of the $8,000 due would be collected. At another announced sale in March, the Sheriff and a party of thirty-three retainers sold property seized for unpaid taxes, starting with the sale of livestock that had been owned by widows and poor men. One of the widows preemptively sold her horse, one widow's horse brought $3; and no one would bid for a poor man's cow. The Sheriff then levied on some farmers, and in the end managed to collect a portion of his claim. The insurrection over and the tax paid, the Governor declared the insurrection ended in June.

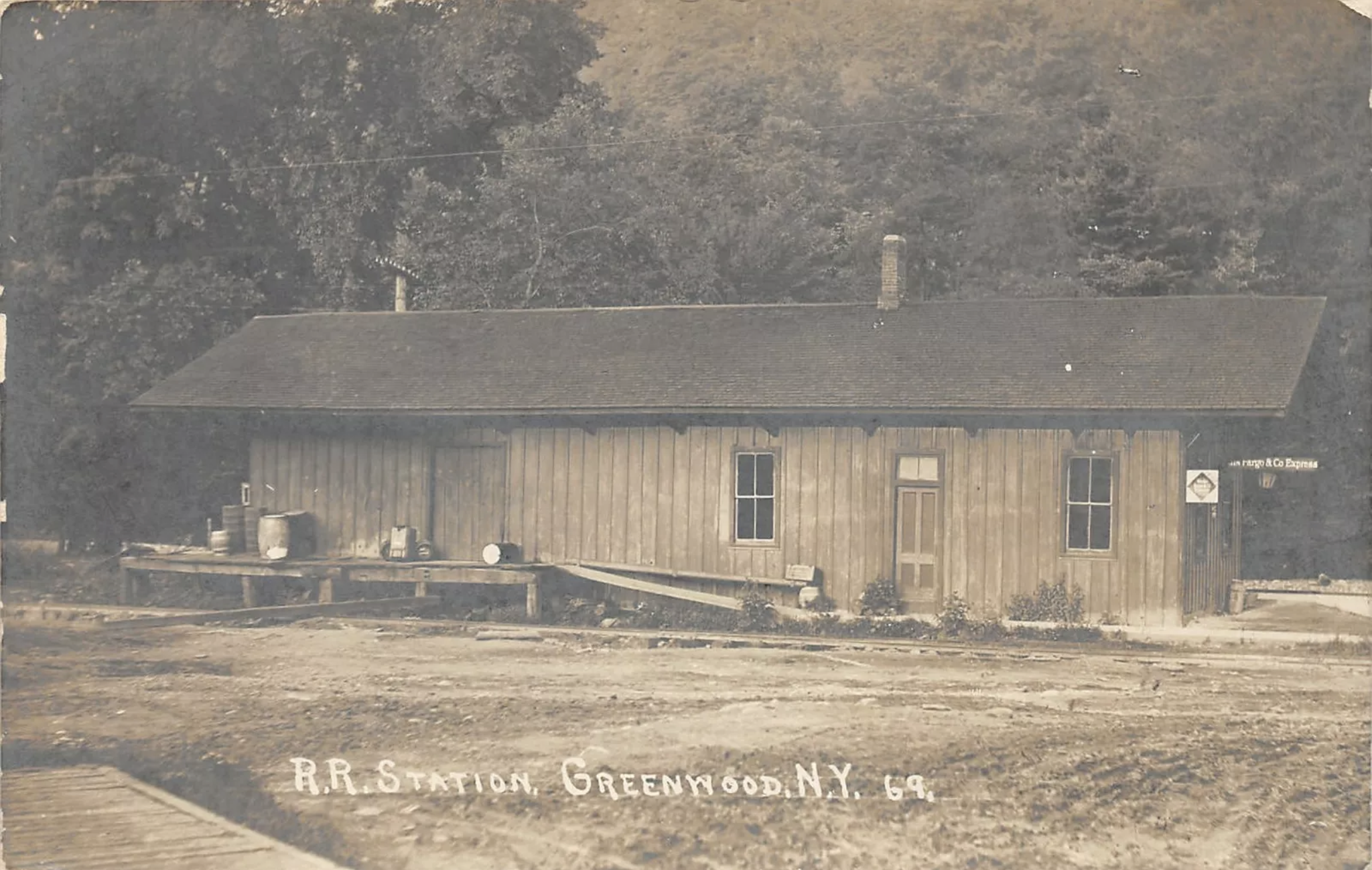
New York & Pennsylvania Railroad station in Greenwood, New York. Note Wells Fargo sign, perhaps from about 1920

In 1896, Greenwood obtained rail service from the New York & Pennsylvania Railroad, which used some of the Rochester, Hornellsville, and Pine Creek grading.

== See also ==
- List of incidents of civil unrest in the United States
