= Arnot Mall =

Coordinates: 42.16011°N 76.87465°W

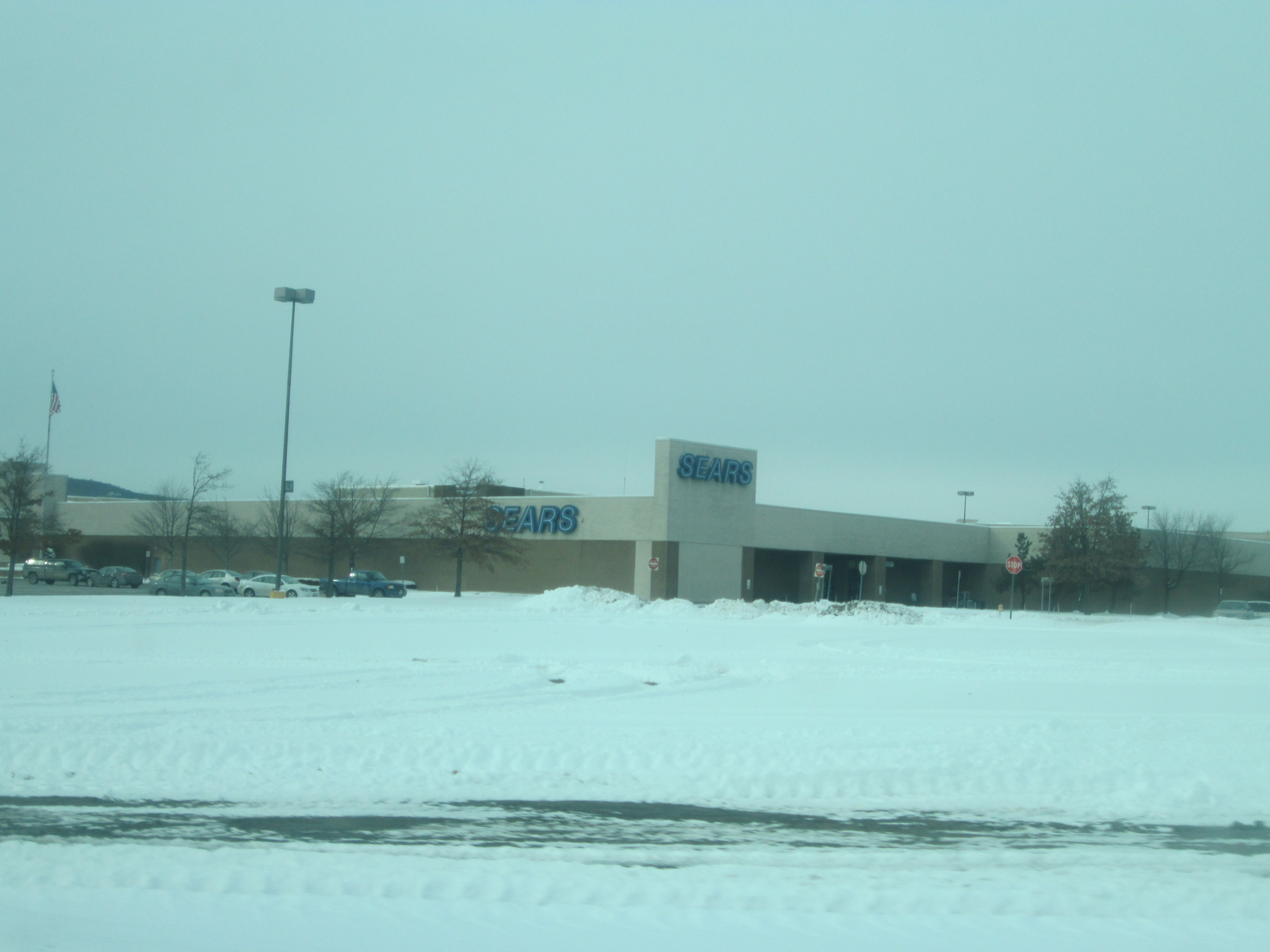
- Sears store, 2014
- Location: Big Flats, New York
- Address: 3300 Chambers Road, Horseheads, New York
- Opened: 1967
- Developer: Arnot Realty
- Manager: Kohan Retail Investment Group
- Owner: Kohan Retail Investment Group
- Num. of stores: 71
- Num. of anchor tenants: 3
- Floor area: 1,050,000 sq ft (98,000 m^{2}).
- Floors: 1 plus 2nd floor food court and movie theater (staff mezzanine in JCPenney)
- Website: arnotmall.com

Arnot Mall is a shopping mall located in Big Flats, New York, in Chemung County. The mall features JCPenney in addition to a 10-screen Regal Cinemas and a Planet Fitness. Arnot Mall is a super regional mall, serving mainly New York's Southern Tier and Finger Lakes Region.

The mall is located at 3300 Chambers Road (Chemung County Route 35) and operated by Kohan Retail Investment Group. Arnot Mall is located along the Southern Tier Expressway (Interstate 86/NY Route 17) at exit 51A between Corning and Elmira. It is open seven days a week and has over 100 stores in all.

== History ==
Arnot Mall opened in 1967 as "The Mall" Shopping Center, at which time it had only 40 stores and JCPenney as the original anchor. The mall took its name from its original developer, Arnot Realty. It underwent an expansion in 1980 adding Bradlees, Hess's, and Sears and now has an area of just over 1,000,000 ft^{2} (93,000 m^{2}) and over 100 stores. Several anchors have changed names in the mall's history, the most recent being Burlington Coat Factory, which opened in 2006 in a former Bradlees. Other former anchor stores include Hess's (which became Kaufmann's in 1995 and Macy's in 2006), and Iszard's (later McCurdy's, then The Bon-Ton).

For the 2011 school year, all PREIT-owned malls, including Arnot Mall, gave away free school supplies with a purchase of at least $75. Racecar driver Jeff Gordon was spotted in the Arnot Mall arcade on Saturday, August 13 after a race on August 8 at Watkins Glen International. Later that day, Robby Gordon gave out signatures outside of GNC. Employees of the mall said they felt the 2011 Virginia earthquake that affected much of the northeastern United States.

In 2016, Macy's closed. The Bon-Ton moved from a smaller anchor location into the vacant Macy's building in 2017.

On April 17, 2018, it was announced The Bon-Ton would close, when the parent company went out of business.

Sears closed in 2020.

On November 21, 2025, it was announced that Burlington would relocate from Arnot Mall to the former JoAnn Fabrics at Southern Tier Crossing on May 15, 2026, which left JCPenney as the only remaining anchor tenant.

In August 2026, it was announced that Kohan Retail Investment Group had purchased the mall for $7.3 million.
