= Horseheads North, New York =

- Census-designated place
- Location within New York Location within the United States
- Coordinates: 42°11′23″N 76°48′23″W
- Country: United States
- State: New York
- County: Chemung
- Town: Horseheads

Area
  - Total: 2.24 sq mi (5.80 km^{2})
  - Land: 2.21 sq mi (5.73 km^{2})
  - Water: 0.027 sq mi (0.07 km^{2})
- Elevation: 940 ft (290 m)

Population (2020)
  - Total: 2,761
  - Density: 1,248.5/sq mi (482.06/km^{2})
- Time zone: UTC-5 (Eastern (EST))
  - Summer (DST): UTC-4 (EDT)
- ZIP Code: 14845 (Horseheads)
- FIPS code: 36-35710
- GNIS feature ID: 2389953

Horseheads North is a census-designated place (CDP) in Chemung County, New York, United States. It is part of the Elmira Metropolitan Statistical Area. As of the 2020 census, Horseheads North had a population of 2,761.

== Geography ==
Horseheads North is located on the northern side of the town of Horseheads at 42°11′23″N 76°48′23″W (42.189774, -76.806351). It is bordered to the north by the town of Veteran and to the south by Horseheads village.

According to the United States Census Bureau, the location has a total area of 2.2 square miles (5.8 km^{2}), of which 0.03 square miles (0.07 km^{2}), or 1.28%, is water. Newtown Creek, a tributary of the Chemung River which in turn flows into the Susquehanna River, forms part of the southeast boundary of the CDP.

New York State Route 14 passes through the area just west of the CDP.

== Demographics ==
Historical population
Census	Pop.	Note	%±
2020	2,761		—
U.S. Decennial Census

=== 2020 census ===
As of the 2020 census, Horseheads North had a population of 2,761. The median age was 44.7 years. 22.1% of residents were under the age of 18 and 20.4% of residents were 65 years of age or older. For every 100 females there were 95.5 males, and for every 100 females age 18 and over there were 93.4 males age 18 and over.

99.3% of residents lived in urban areas, while 0.7% lived in rural areas.

There were 1,150 households in Horseheads North, of which 29.9% had children under the age of 18 living in them. Of all households, 54.2% were married-couple households, 13.3% were households with a male householder and no spouse or partner present, and 24.3% were households with a female householder and no spouse or partner present. About 24.4% of all households were made up of individuals and 12.0% had someone living alone who was 65 years of age or older.

There were 1,187 housing units, of which 3.1% were vacant. The homeowner vacancy rate was 1.5% and the rental vacancy rate was 2.5%.

Racial composition as of the 2020 census
Race	Number	Percent
White	2,498	90.5%
Black or African American	48	1.7%
American Indian and Alaska Native	8	0.3%
Asian	52	1.9%
Native Hawaiian and Other Pacific Islander	0	0.0%
Some other race	10	0.4%
Two or more races	145	5.3%
Hispanic or Latino (of any race)	46	1.7%

=== 2000 census ===
As of the census of 2000, there were 2,852 people, 1,091 households, and 833 families residing in the CDP. The population density was 1,239.1 inhabitants per square mile (478.4/km^{2}). There were 1,116 housing units at an average density of 484.9 per square mile (187.2/km^{2}). The racial makeup of the CDP was 96.88% White, 0.84% African American, 0.14% Native American, 1.23% Asian, 0.04% from other races, and 0.88% from two or more races. Hispanic or Latino of any race were 0.46% of the population.

There were 1,091 households, out of which 35.1% had children under the age of 18 living with them, 64.0% were married couples living together, 10.0% had a female householder with no husband present, and 23.6% were non-families. 18.9% of all households were made up of individuals, and 9.2% had someone living alone who was 65 years of age or older. The average household size was 2.61 and the average family size was 3.00.

In the CDP, the population was spread out, with 26.6% under the age of 18, 5.4% from 18 to 24, 27.8% from 25 to 44, 25.6% from 45 to 64, and 14.6% who were 65 years of age or older. The median age was 40 years. For every 100 females, there were 90.6 males. For every 100 females age 18 and over, there were 89.3 males.

The median income for a household in the CDP was $50,182, and the median income for a family was $54,419. Males had a median income of $35,873 versus $26,852 for females. The per capita income for the CDP was $21,813. About 3.2% of families and 4.8% of the population were below the poverty line, including 4.7% of those under age 18 and 12.0% of those age 65 or over.

== Education ==
The school district is Horseheads Central School District.
