= Elmira and Lake Ontario Railroad =

Map

The Elmira and Lake Ontario Railroad was a subsidiary of the Northern Central Railway and later the Pennsylvania Railroad, formed to give the Northern Central an outlet for coal traffic on Lake Ontario.

== Predecessors ==
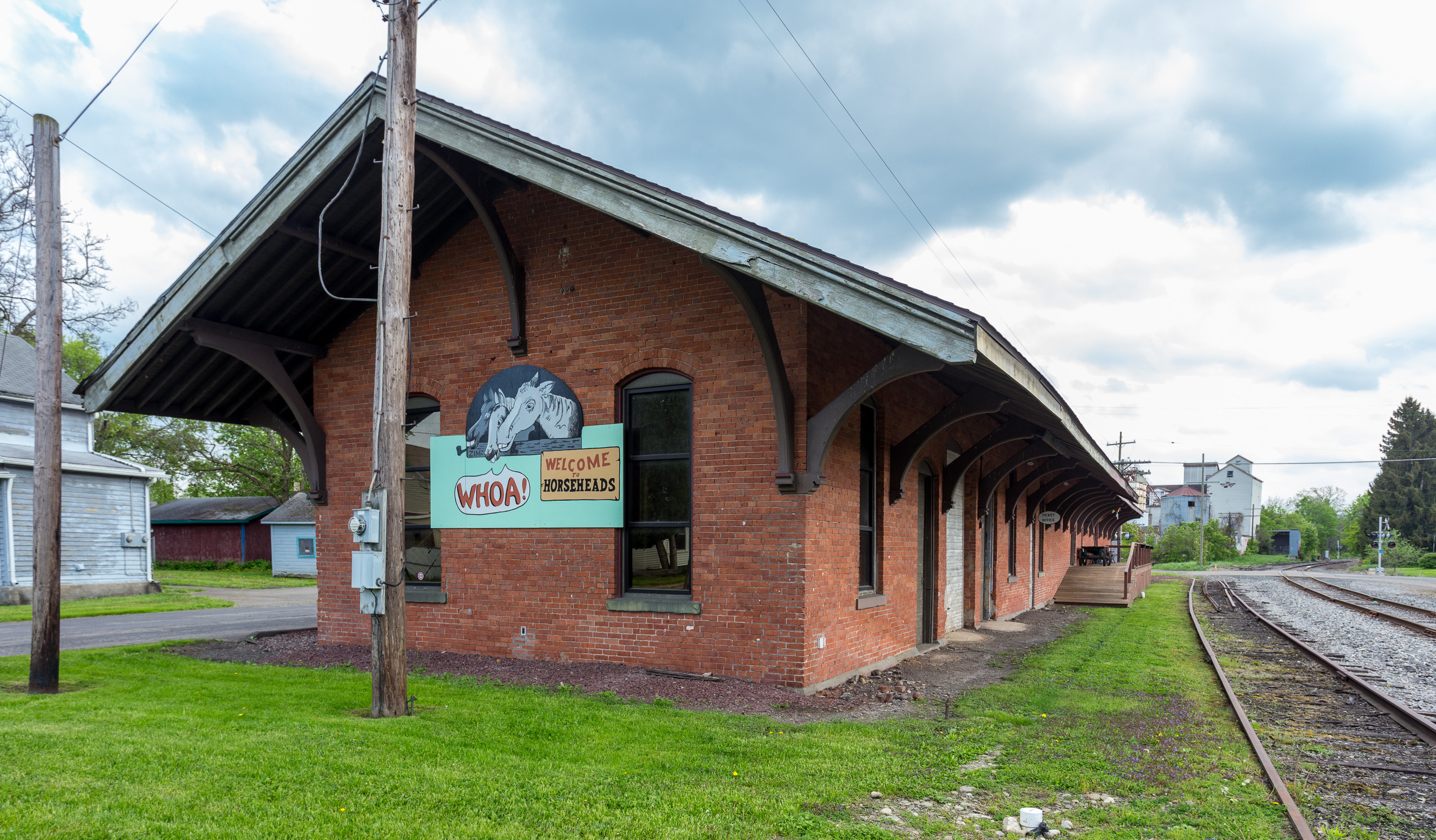
The Chemung Railway Depot in Horseheads

=== Horseheads–Canandaigua ===
The Canandaigua and Corning Railroad Company was incorporated by a special act of the New York Legislature on May 14, 1845, to build between the two points named, and the Chemung Railroad was incorporated on the same date. The Chemung RR was the first to finish its line, from Horseheads, on the New York and Erie Railroad, to Watkins Glen (then known as Jefferson), on Seneca Lake, in 1850. It was operated as a branch of the Erie, and accordingly used 6 ft (1,829 mm) broad gauge. On March 8, 1850, another act authorized the Canandaigua & Corning to change its name to the Canandaigua & Elmira and connect with the Chemung RR. It opened a line between the Chemung RR at Jefferson and Canandaigua on September 15, 1851, and was also operated by the Erie. On September 14, 1852, it was renamed the Canandaigua and Elmira Railroad Company.

On January 1, 1853, the Erie ceased to operate the two railroads, and the Chemung RR was run as part of the Canandaigua & Elmira, now an independent operation. On July 1, 1853, the Canandaigua and Niagara Falls Railroad opened between Canandaigua and North Tonawanda. It was also 6 ft (1,829 mm) broad gauge, and was leased by the Canandaigua & Elmira RR, giving it access to the Niagara Falls Suspension Bridge.

The Canandaigua & Elmira RR was sold at foreclosure on April 23, 1857, to George B. Holmes and was reorganized on May 2, 1857, as the Elmira, Canandaigua and Niagara Falls Rail Road Company, continuing to operate the Chemung RR. On November 6, 1857, the Canandaigua & Niagara Falls RR was also sold under foreclosure. The Elmira, Canandaigua & Niagara Falls RR went bankrupt, and a receiver was appointed on July 1, 1858; the Chemung RR reverting to Erie operation. The bankrupt railroad was sold at foreclosure on July 23, 1858, to Charles Congdon and Robert B. Potter. On August 25, 1858, the foreclosed Canandaigua and Niagara Falls RR was reorganized as the Niagara Bridge and Canandaigua Railroad, which was leased to the New York Central on September 1, 1858. It was regauged to 4 ft 8 1/2 in (1,435 mm) standard gauge, depriving the Erie of a broad gauge connection to Niagara Falls. The foreclosed Elmira, Canandaigua and Niagara Falls RR was reorganized on February 18, 1859, as the Elmira, Jefferson and Canandaigua Railroad Company. The Erie continued to operate the Elmira, Jefferson & Canandaigua RR, which in turn operated the Chemung RR, until January 19, 1866. The two lines were then leased to the Northern Central Railway to replace an unsatisfactory joint routing over the Buffalo, New York and Erie Railroad; the line to be given a third (standard gauge) rail by May 1, when the lease was to take effect.

=== Stanley–Sodus Point ===
The Sodus Point and Southern Rail Road Company was incorporated on March 19, 1852, under the general law of New York State. The railroad was not finished until January 16, 1873, when it opened between Sodus Point and Gorham. It became apparent that a connection at Gorham would not soon be forthcoming, and the line between Gorham and the Elmira, Jefferson & Canandaigua RR connection at Stanley was abandoned on February 16, 1873. The Sodus Point & Southern RR was sold at foreclosure on September 21, 1875, and reorganized on November 30, 1875, as the Ontario Southern Railroad Company.

The Geneva and Southwestern Railway Company was incorporated in New York on May 29, 1871, to build a line from Geneva (at the head of Seneca Lake and on the New York Central) to Wayland. The Rochester, Hornellsville, and Pine Creek Railroad Company was incorporated in New York on March 30, 1872, to build from Olean east to Hornellsville; then south to the Pennsylvania state line to connect with the Jersey Shore, Pine Creek and State Line Railroad. The Geneva Southwestern and Hornellsville Railway Company was incorporated in New York on November 29, 1872, to extend the Geneva & Southwestern Ry. to Hornellsville and connect it with the Rochester, Hornellsville & Pine Creek Ry. Some grading was done by the Geneva & Southwestern Ry. between Geneva and Naples, which was later used by the Lehigh Valley Naples Branch, and by the RH&PC between Canisteo and Rexville, which was later used by the New York and Pennsylvania Railroad. However, the Panic of 1873 brought work on these railroads to a halt, never to resume.

The Gaines and State Line Rail Road Company was incorporated on November 4, 1875, in Pennsylvania. It was intended as another outlet for the RH&PC, to run from a connection at the state line through Potter and Tioga Counties to West Branch Township, Pennsylvania. On November 12, 1875, the Geneva & Southwestern Ry. was consolidated with the Geneva, Southwestern & Hornellsville Ry. to form The Geneva and Hornellsville Railway. The Geneva & Hornellsville Ry., Gaines & State Line RR and Rochester, Hornellsville & Pine Creek RR were consolidated on January 13, 1876, to form The Geneva, Hornellsville and Pine Creek Railway Company.

The Geneva, Hornellsville & Pine Creek Ry. was merged with the Ontario Southern RR on December 17, 1879, to form The Lake Ontario Southern Railway Company. One of the backers of the Sodus Point & Southern RR was E. H. Harriman, who hoped to sell it to the Erie or the Northern Central. It was sold at foreclosure on September 4, 1882, and reorganized as the Sodus Bay and Southern Railway Company on November 5, 1882. In 1884, it became a subsidiary of the Northern Central, which built a coal trestle at the terminus at Sodus Bay.

== Consolidation and Operation ==
The Chemung RR, Elmira, Jefferson & Canandaigua RR, and Sodus Bay & Southern Ry. were consolidated on December 31, 1886, to form the Elmira and Lake Ontario Railroad Company, a continuous line from the Erie interchange at Horseheads to Sodus Point, with a branch from Stanley to Canandaigua. It was leased and operated by the Northern Central, which reached it via the Elmira and Williamsport Railroad, another subsidiary, and trackage rights over the Erie from Elmira to Horseheads. The lease was transferred to the PRR, which controlled the Northern Central, on January 1, 1911.

A short line from Canandaigua to a pier on Canandaigua Lake was built by the Canandaigua Lake Railroad Company, incorporated July 21, 1887, which was merged into the Elmira & Lake Ontario on December 27, 1888.

The principal purpose of the railroad was to serve as an outlet for coal shipments from the mines tapped by the Northern Central, using the coal pier at Sodus Bay to ship to markets on the Great Lakes.

Parent Pennsylvania Railroad acquired control of the connecting Newark and Marion Railway on May 4, 1930, and merged it into the Elmira & Lake Ontario a year later. On January 31, 1956, the Elmira & Lake Ontario was merged into the Northern Central Railway.

== See also ==
- Elmira and Seneca Lake Railway
