= Chemung Canal =

19th century canal in New York state, United States

Coordinates: 42°19′51.5″N 76°50′31.3″W

The Chemung Canal is a former canal in New York, United States. The canal connected Seneca Lake at Watkins Glen to the Chemung River at Elmira, New York. It was planned to connect the Finger Lakes region and Pennsylvania's Susquehanna River watershed with New York's Erie Canal system. The latter connected the Great Lakes with the Hudson River and ultimately the Atlantic port of New York City.

The state government allocated $300,000 for the construction, which started in 1830 and was completed in 1833. Opening to full service was delayed because of damage from a rainstorm in May 1833. Damage by rain and seasonal flooding was a yearly problem during the use of the canal. Forty-nine locks were needed to raise and lower barges passing through the canal.

The selection of the Chemung Canal's route was a disappointment to Ithaca, New York, which had hoped to make the Erie–Susquehanna connection via Cayuga Lake.

In 1854, the completion of the Junction Canal extended the length of the canal system southward from the Chemung River into Pennsylvania. A feeder canal connected the Chemung Canal to the Corning, New York area.

The canal fell into disuse and disrepair by 1878, and parts of its right of way were sold off. Subsequently, the poor drainage of the canal remnants required expenditures to correct the nuisance of undrained water. Like many other canals, the Chemung Canal could not compete with the railroad companies.

While it was in use, the Chemung Canal enabled coal, lumber, and agricultural products to be shipped from Pennsylvania and the Southern Tier of New York northward, where the Erie Canal could move the goods into the world market. Canal barges were towed the length of Seneca Lake from Watkins Glen to Geneva and the Cayuga and Seneca Canal system, which connected to the Erie Canal.

The growth of Southern Tier cities such as Elmira and Corning was enhanced by the canal.

Parts of the Catharine Valley Trail are built along old Chemung Canal towpaths.
