= New York State Route 245 =

Highway in New York, U.S.

New York State Route 245
- Map of Finger Lakes region in central New York with NY 245 highlighted in red

Route information
- Maintained by NYSDOT
- Length: 28.62 mi (46.06 km)
- Existed: 1930–present

Major junctions
- South end: NY 21 in Naples
- North end: US 20 / NY 5 / NY 14A in Geneva

Location
- Country: United States
- State: New York
- Counties: Ontario, Yates

Highway system
- New York Highways; Interstate; US; State; Reference; Parkways
← NY 244	→ NY 246

New York State Route 245 (NY 245) is a state highway in the Finger Lakes region of New York in the United States. The southern terminus of the route is at NY 21 in Naples. The northern terminus is at NY 5, U.S. Route 20 and NY 14A west of Geneva. From Geneva to Naples, NY 245 traverses the land from the north end of Seneca Lake to the south end of Canandaigua Lake in roughly a northeast to southwest direction.

== Route description ==
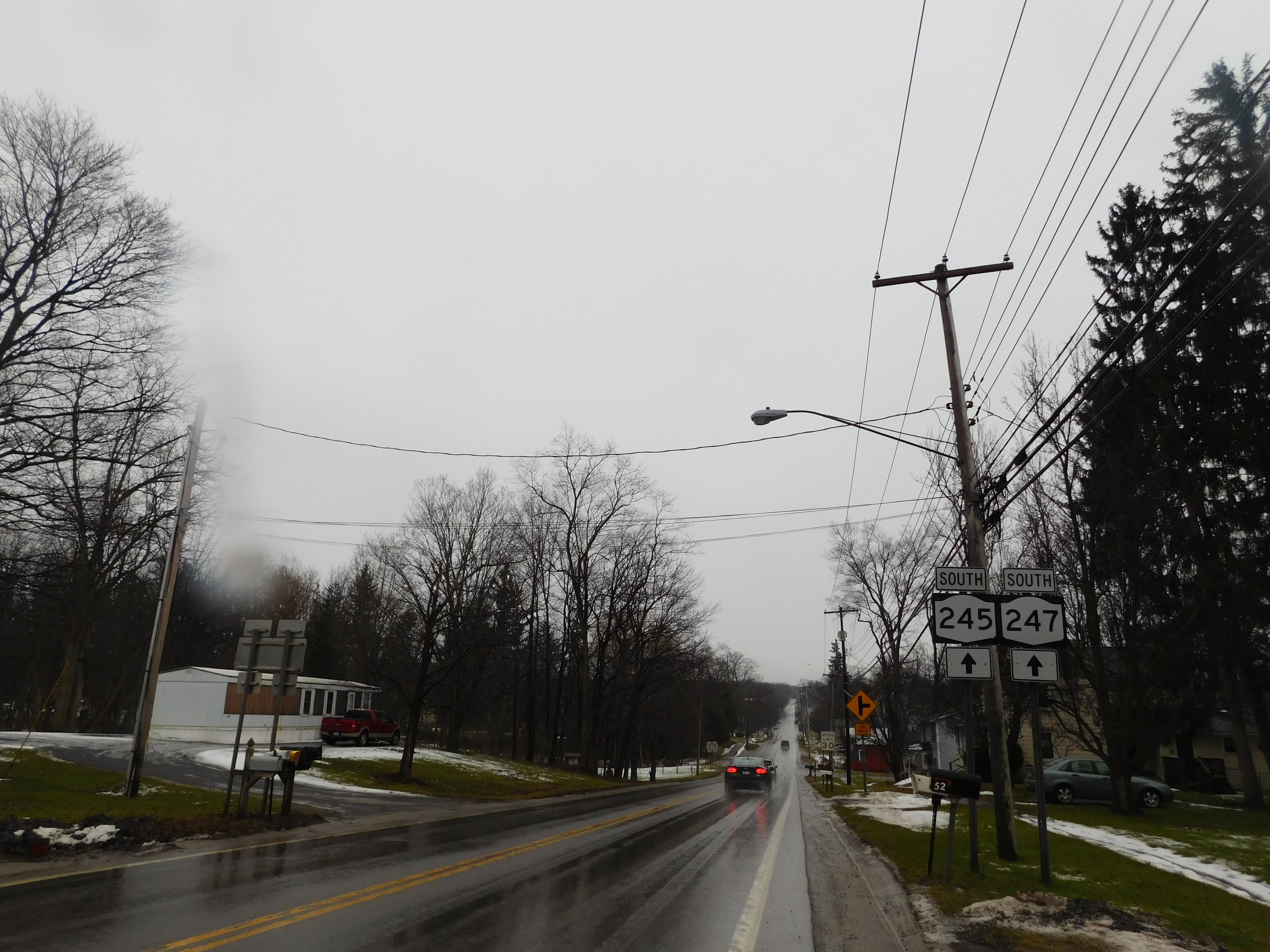
Southbound on NY 245 and NY 247 in Rushville

NY 245 begins at an intersection with NY 21 immediately in the northeastern portion of the village of Naples, located in the town of same name, in Ontario County. Shortly after leaving the village, the route heads to the northeast along the base of a series of mountains delimiting the Canandaigua Lake valley, entering Yates County and the town of Italy before following the valley surrounding the West River at a fork in the primary valley near the southern end of Canandaigua Lake. NY 245 follows the eastern edge of the valley to the town of Middlesex, where it intersects NY 364 in the hamlet of the same name's center. NY 245 and NY 364 run concurrent for a block before NY 364 splits from NY 245 to ascend the eastern edge of the valley and continue towards Potter. North of Middlesex, the valley becomes less prominent as NY 245 progresses northward. Near the Ontario County line, NY 245 turns northeast to serve the dual-county village of Rushville, located in the towns of Potter and Gorham. Within the village, NY 245 meets NY 247. The two routes embark on an overlap northward into Ontario County.

Shortly into Ontario County, NY 247 separates from NY 245, taking a due north alignment through the town of Gorham. NY 245 continues eastward through predominantly hilly terrain, passing through the hamlets of Gorham (where it crosses Flint Creek) and Stanley (located in the town of Seneca, centered around a former junction between the Pennsylvania and Lehigh Valley railroads adjacent to NY 245, now part of Ontario Pathways Rail Trail) before meeting NY 14A at a rural junction in the town of Seneca. The routes merge, forming a concurrency northward to the town of Geneva, the outskirts of the city of same name, where both routes end at the concurrent routes of US 20 and NY 5.

== History ==
In the mid-1920s, NY 52 was assigned to a series of highways connecting Dansville to Geneva by way of Wayland and Naples. The alignment of NY 52 east of Naples was largely identical to that of modern NY 245; however, between Middlesex and Rushville, NY 52 utilized modern NY 364 and NY 247 instead. Initially, NY 52 passed through Cohocton on its way from Wayland to Naples; it was realigned to follow a more direct routing between Wayland and Naples by 1930. In the 1930 renumbering of state highways in New York, most of NY 52 was incorporated into NY 39, a new route extending from Dunkirk to Geneva. Unlike NY 52, NY 39 went directly from Middlesex to Rushville. Also assigned as part of the renumbering was NY 245, which began in Pike and ended at Perry Center. It followed what is now NY 39 from Pike to Perry and NY 246 from Perry to Perry Center. NY 245 was rerouted north of Perry in September 1933 to follow a new highway (modern NY 39) northeast to a new terminus at Pine Tavern.

The alignments of NY 39 and NY 245 east of Pike were mostly swapped c. 1940, placing NY 39 on its modern alignment and NY 245 on what is now NY 436 from a junction northeast of Pike to Dansville, NY 63 from Dansville to Wayland, and its modern alignment from Naples to Geneva. In between Wayland and Naples, NY 245 had an overlap with NY 21. By 1947, NY 245 was rerouted west of Portageville to follow NY 39's former alignment on Griffith Road west to Pike. In the late 1940s, NY 245 was also altered between Nunda and Dansville to overlap NY 408, NY 258, and NY 36 north, east, and southward, respectively, between the two villages. This realignment was short-lived as NY 245 was restored to its original, direct alignment between Nunda and Dansville in the late 1950s.

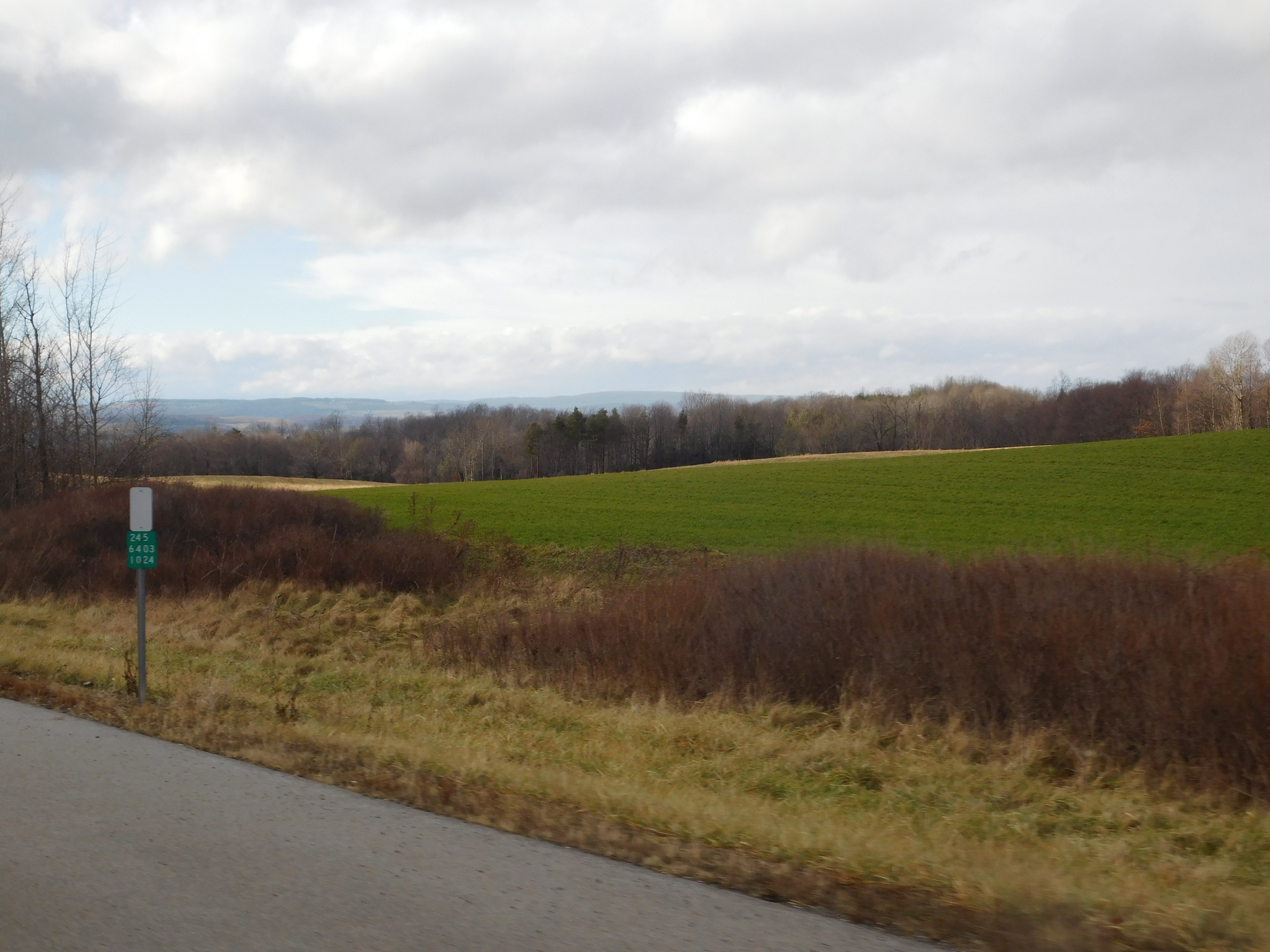
NY 245 reference marker on I-390

The first portion of the Genesee Expressway was built between NY 245 in Dansville and U.S. Route 15 (now NY 15) south of Wayland in the mid-1960s. It opened by 1968 as a realignment of NY 245, which overlapped US 15 and NY 21 north from the expressway to rejoin its previous routing in Wayland. On January 1, 1970, the entirety of the Genesee Expressway, including its proposed routing south to Avoca and north to Rochester, was redesignated as NY 401. NY 245 was then realigned to follow its previous at-grade routing between Dansville and Wayland.

This move proved to be only temporary as NY 245 was truncated to the eastern terminus of its overlap with NY 21 in Naples c. 1972. The former routing of NY 245 between Pike and Dansville was redesignated as NY 436 while the segment from Dansville from Wayland, which NY 245 had shared with NY 63 since the early 1940s, initially became unnumbered after NY 63 was truncated to Dansville around the same time. The change was short-lived, however, as NY 63 was reextended to Wayland in the late 1970s or early 1980s.

== Major intersections ==
County	Location	mi	km	Destinations	Notes
Ontario	Village of Naples	0.00	0.00	NY 21	Southern terminus
Yates	Middlesex	8.84	14.23	NY 364 north	Southern terminus of NY 245 / NY 364 overlap; hamlet of Middlesex
Yates	Middlesex	8.93	14.37	NY 364 south	Northern terminus of NY 245 / NY 364 overlap
Yates	Rushville	13.86	22.31	NY 247 south	Southern terminus of NY 245 / NY 247 overlap
Ontario	Gorham	15.29	24.61	NY 247 north – Canandaigua	Northern terminus of NY 245 / NY 247 overlap; hamlet of Baldwin Corners
Ontario	Seneca	25.52	41.07	NY 14A south	Southern terminus of NY 14A / NY 245 overlap
Ontario	Town of Geneva	28.62	46.06	US 20 / NY 5 / NY 14A south	Northern terminus, northern terminus of NY 14A; northern terminus of NY 14A / NY 245 overlap
1.000 mi = 1.609 km; 1.000 km = 0.621 mi: Concurrency terminus
