= Thomas B. Wilson =

American politician (1852–1929)

Member of the New York State Senate from the 42nd district
- In office January 1, 1913 – December 31, 1916
- Preceded by: Frederick W. Griffith
- Succeeded by: William A. Carson

Member of the New York State Assembly
- In office January 1, 1911 – December 31, 1912
- Preceded by: Sanford W. Abbey
- Succeeded by: Herman Ferdinand Schnirel

Personal details
- Born: Thomas Burrell Wilson; December 12, 1852 Hall, New York, U.S.
- Died: January 11, 1929 (aged 76) Hall, New York, U.S.
- Party: Republican
- Spouse: Margaret Ann Scoon (m. 1878)
- Children: 3
- Occupation: Politician

Thomas Burrell Wilson (December 12, 1852 in Hall, Ontario County, New York – January 11, 1929 in Hall, Ontario Co., NY) was an American politician from New York.

== Life ==
He attended the district schools and Canandaigua Academy. Then he worked on the family farm. In 1878, he married Margaret Ann Scoon, and they had three children. He was Supervisor of the Town of Seneca for seven terms, and Chairman of the Board of Supervisors of Ontario County for two terms.

Wilson was a member of the New York State Assembly (Ontario Co.) in 1911 and 1912; and was Chairman of the Committee on Agriculture in 1912.

He was a member of the New York State Senate (42nd D.) from 1913 to 1916, sitting in the 136th, 137th, 138th and 139th New York State Legislatures.

He was also a Trustee of Cornell University from 1909 until his death in 1929.

== Sources ==
- Official New York from Cleveland to Hughes by Charles Elliott Fitch (Hurd Publishing Co., New York and Buffalo, 1911, Vol. IV; pg. 360)
- THOMAS B. WILSON, 76.; Ex-State Senator and Agricultural Leader Dies at Hall, N.Y. in NYT on January 12, 1929
- Obit transcribed from the Proceedings of the 74th Annual Meeting of the New York State Horticultural Society (1929, pg 240f)

New York State Assembly
| Preceded by Sanford W. Abbey | New York State Assembly; Ontario County; 1911–1912 | Succeeded by Herman Ferdinand Schnirel |
New York State Senate
| Preceded by Frederick W. Griffith | New York State Senate; 42nd District; 1913–1916 | Succeeded by William A. Carson |
