= New York State Route 53 =

Highway in New York

New York State Route 53
- Map of Finger Lakes region in the Southern Tier of New York with NY 53 highlighted in red

Route information
- Maintained by NYSDOT
- Length: 22.50 mi (36.21 km)
- Existed: 1930–present

Major junctions
- South end: NY 415 in Bath
- I-86 / NY 17 / Southern Tier Expressway in Bath
- North end: NY 21 in Naples

Location
- Country: United States
- State: New York
- Counties: Steuben, Ontario

Highway system
- New York Highways; Interstate; US; State; Reference; Parkways
← NY 52A	→ NY 54

New York State Route 53 (NY 53) is a north–south state highway located in the Finger Lakes region of New York in the United States. It extends for 22.50 miles (36.21 km) from an intersection with NY 415 near the hamlet of Kanona in northern Steuben County to a junction with NY 21 in the village of Naples in southern Ontario County. Just north of Kanona, located within the town of Bath, NY 53 connects to the Southern Tier Expressway (Interstate 86 or I-86 and NY 17). About midway between Kanona and Naples, the route serves the hamlet of Prattsburgh.

When NY 53 was assigned as part of the 1930 renumbering of state highways in New York, it extended from Kanona in the south to the Canandaigua area in the north, utilizing what is now NY 247 north of Potter. At the same time, the piece of what is now NY 53 from Prattsburgh to Naples became NY 247. NY 53 was realigned onto its modern alignment from Prattsburgh to Naples in the early 1940s. NY 247, supplanted by the realignment, was reassigned to NY 53's former routing north of Potter.

== Route description ==
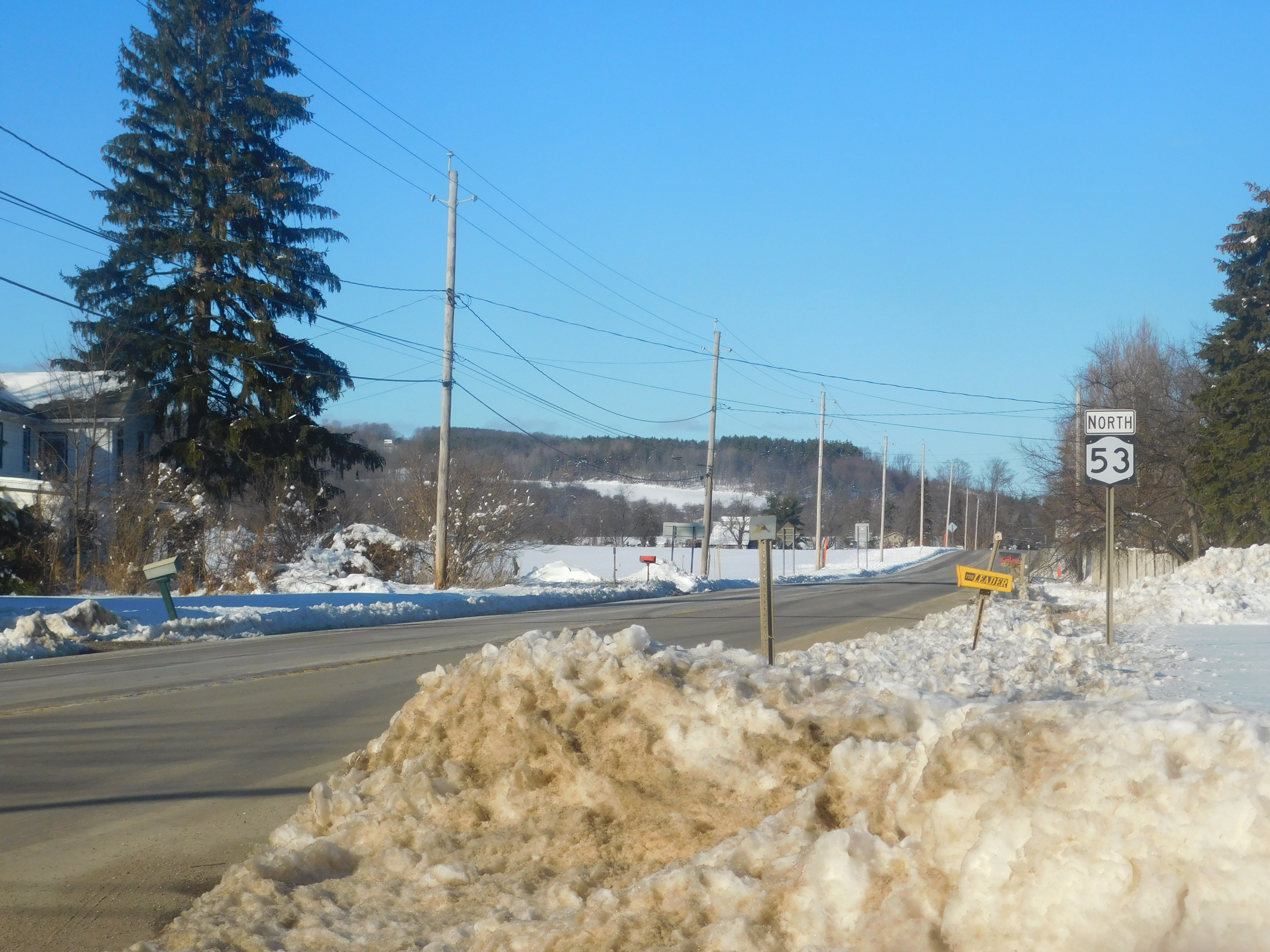
NY 53 northbound from Gardiner Road in Wheeler

NY 53 begins at an intersection with NY 415, the former routing of U.S. Route 15 (US 15) through the Southern Tier, southeast of Kanona, a hamlet within the Steuben County town of Bath. It initially heads northwest on Main Street, following the Cohocton River into the center of Kanona. At this point, NY 53 leaves Main Street to follow an unnamed road north through the residential northern half of the community to an interchange with the Southern Tier Expressway (I-86 and NY 17) at exit 37. Not far from here is the southern terminus of I-390, located about one and a half miles (2.4 km) to the northwest at exit 36. North of I-86, NY 53 follows Fivemile Creek northeastward into a valley that leads to the rural town of Wheeler.

Over the next ten miles (16 km), the route traverses a series of small hamlets located in otherwise undeveloped and isolated areas of Steuben County. The gully leads NY 53 to the Wheeler–Prattsburgh town line, where the valley makes a sharp turn to follow the town line to the east. NY 53 continues due north into Prattsburgh, however, climbing the side of the valley to reach the hamlet of Prattsburgh. The route heads north–south through the western edge of the large community, following Main Street through its central business district. At Chapel Street, the commercial surroundings end and NY 53 turns to leave Prattsburgh to the northwest.

Roughly three miles (5 km) outside of Prattsburgh, NY 53 turns to the west, loosely paralleling the Steuben–Ontario county line as it winds its way across the hilly, forested northernmost portion of Steuben County. The route breaks from this alignment after four miles (6 km), at which point it turns to the north and crosses into Ontario County. Across the county line, the route maintains a north–south alignment for two miles (3.2 km) across a mix of farmlands and forests. At the north end of this stretch, NY 53 enters a residential area at the southern edge of the village of Naples, where it ends at a junction with NY 21.

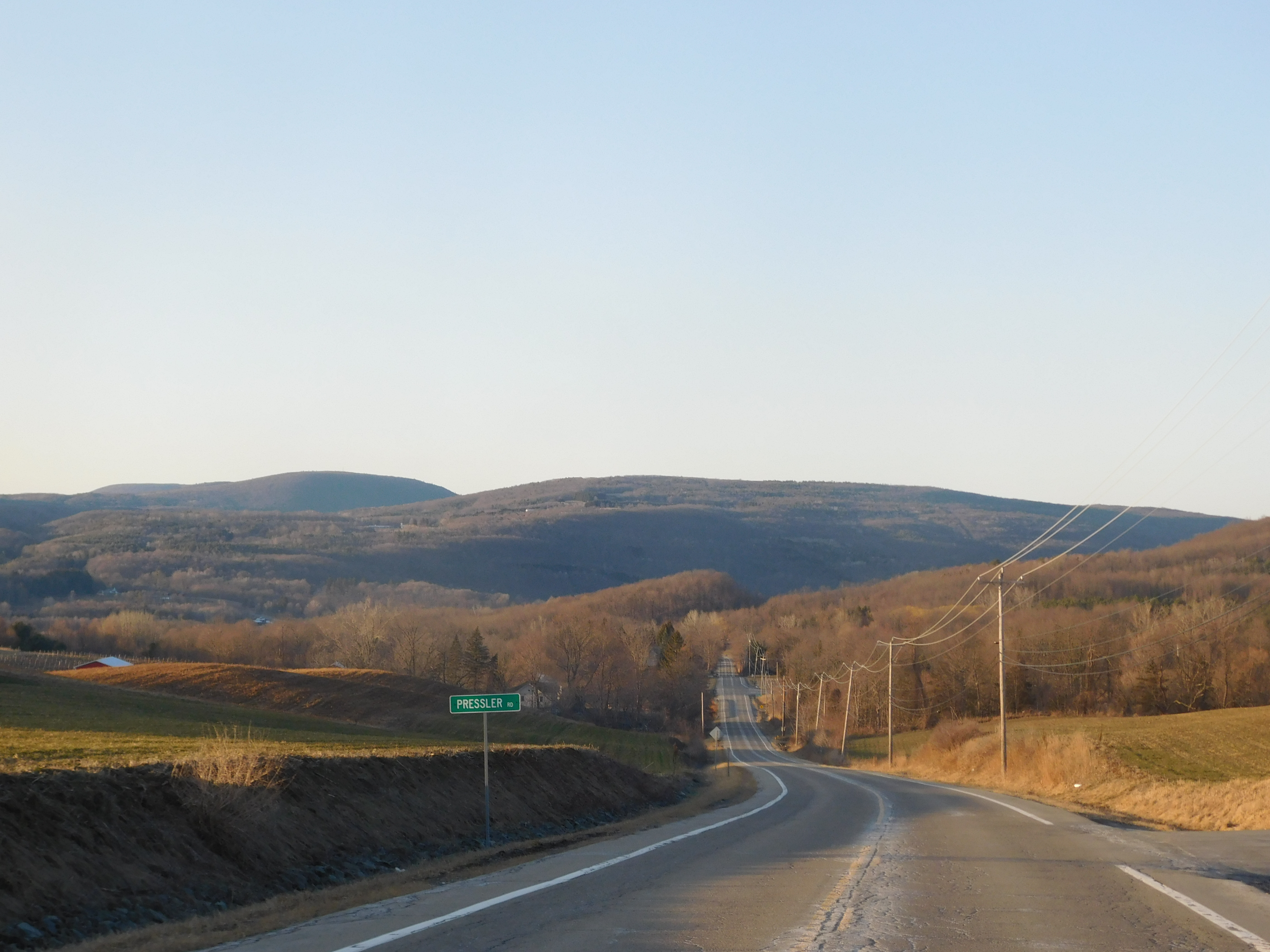
NY 53 northbound in Italy

== History ==
NY 53 was assigned as part of the 1930 renumbering of state highways in New York to its current alignment from Kanona north to Prattsburgh. Past Prattsburgh, NY 53 continued north on State Road, McMichael Road, Wetmore Road, Italy Hill Road, Italy Friend Road, Friend Road, and modern NY 247 before terminating at a junction with US 20 and NY 5 east of Canandaigua. What is now NY 53 from Prattsburgh to Naples was designated NY 247. In the early 1940s, NY 53 was realigned north of Prattsburgh to follow NY 247 to Naples while NY 247 was reassigned to the portion of NY 53's former routing north of NY 364 in Potter. The segment of NY 53's former routing between Prattsburgh and McMichael Road north of the hamlet remained state-maintained as a reference route until April 1, 1980, when ownership and maintenance of the road was transferred from the state to Steuben County as part of a highway maintenance swap between the two levels of government.

== Major intersections ==
County	Location	mi	km	Destinations	Notes
Steuben	Town of Bath	0.00	0.00	NY 415	Southern terminus, Hamlet of Kanona
Steuben	Town of Bath	0.63	1.01	I-86 / NY 17 / Southern Tier Expressway – Jamestown, Binghamton	Exit 37 (I-86 / NY 17)
Ontario	Village of Naples	22.50	36.21	NY 21	Northern terminus
1.000 mi = 1.609 km; 1.000 km = 0.621 mi
