= Prattsburgh Central School =

Prattsburgh Central High School

Location
- 1 Academy St; Prattsburgh, New York 14873; United States
- Coordinates: 42.525207°N 77.289474°W

Information
- Type: Public
- School district: Franklin Academy & Prattsburgh Central School District
- NCES School ID: 362379003310
- Principal: Erin Peck
- Teaching staff: 37.00 (on an FTE basis)
- Grades: PK-12
- Enrollment: 365 (2021-2022)
- Student to teacher ratio: 9.86
- Campus: Rural: Distant
- Color(s): Green and White
- Mascot: Vikings
- Yearbook: Franklinlite
- Website: www.prattsburghcsd.org

Prattsburgh Central School (PCS) is a public school located in Prattsburgh, New York serving students in grades pre-K–12. It is operated by the Franklin Academy & Prattsburgh Central School District.
