= New York State Route 247 =

Highway in New York

New York State Route 247
- Map of Finger Lakes region in central New York with NY 247 highlighted in red

Route information
- Maintained by NYSDOT
- Length: 11.08 mi (17.83 km)
- Existed: 1930–present

Major junctions
- South end: NY 364 in Potter
- North end: US 20 / NY 5 in Hopewell

Location
- Country: United States
- State: New York
- Counties: Yates, Ontario

Highway system
- New York Highways; Interstate; US; State; Reference; Parkways
← NY 246	→ NY 248

New York State Route 247 (NY 247) is a north–south state highway located in the Finger Lakes region of New York in the United States. It extends for 11.08 miles (17.83 km) from an intersection with NY 364 in the Yates County town of Potter to a junction with U.S. Route 20 (US 20) and NY 5 in the Ontario County town of Hopewell. In between, NY 247 serves the village of Rushville and it overlaps with NY 245 for 1.5 miles (2.4 km) from Rushville to Gorham. NY 247 was originally assigned to modern NY 53 from Prattsburgh to Naples in the 1930 renumbering of state highways in New York. At the same time, what is now NY 247 became part of NY 53. The alignments of the two routes were mostly swapped north of Prattsburgh in the early 1940s, placing NY 247 on its current alignment.

== Route description ==
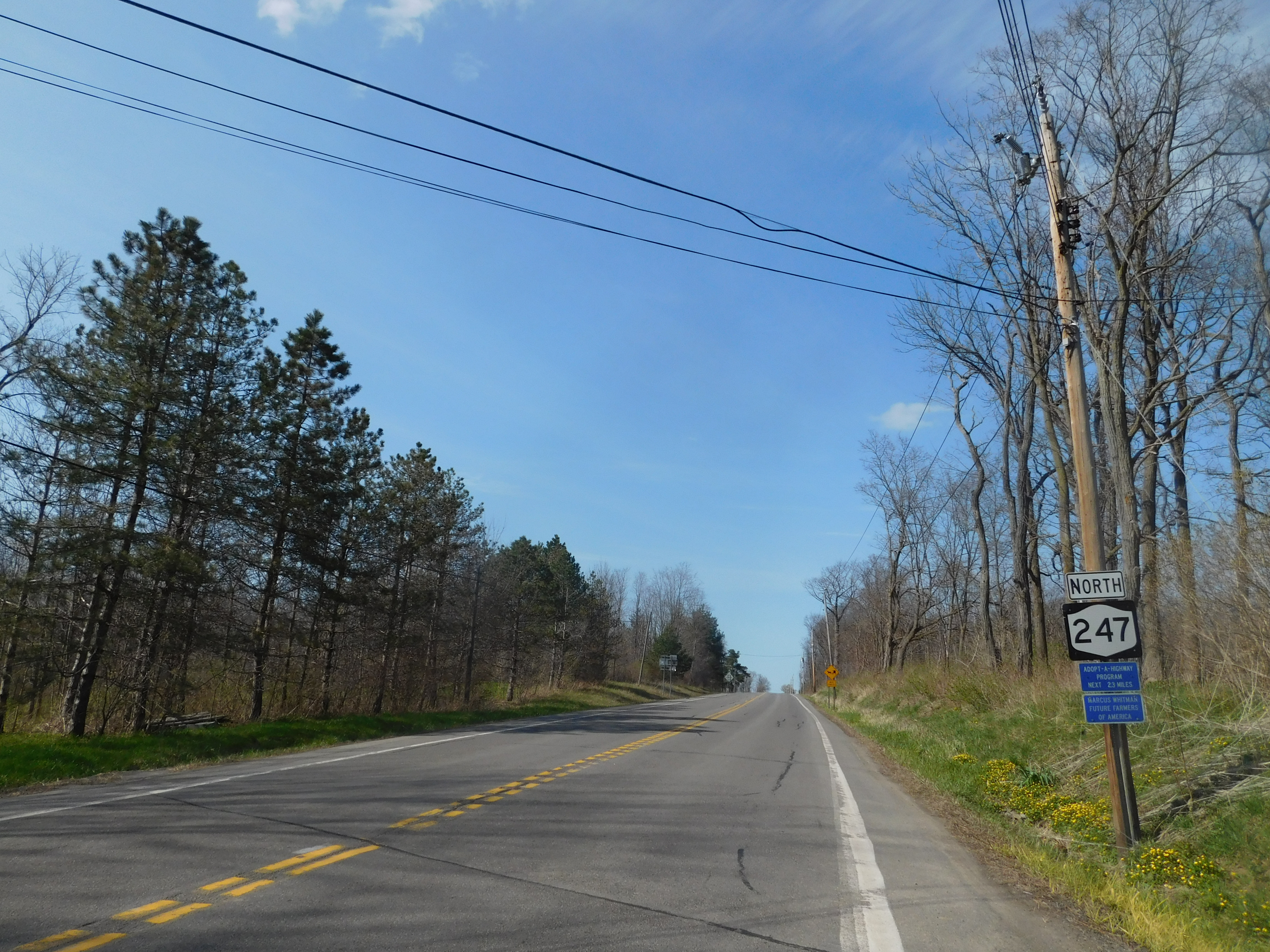
NY 247 north from NY 245 in Gorham

NY 247 begins at an intersection with NY 364 in a creek valley northwest of the hamlet of Potter. While NY 364 runs east–west across the base of the valley, NY 247 heads to the northwest, paralleling NY 364 for 150 yards (137 m) as it gradually climbs the northern side of the gully. After reaching the top of the valley, NY 247 curves to the north and begins the north–south alignment that most of the remainder of the route follows. Continuing north, it traverses 2.5 miles (4.0 km) of open farmland on its way to the village of Rushville, located in both Yates and Ontario counties. NY 247 follows South Main Street through the Yates County portion of the village to Rushville's central business district, where it meets NY 245 at Gilbert Street. NY 245 joins NY 247 here, and both routes follow North Main Street into Ontario County.

Across the county line, the routes fork from North Main Street near the northern village line to follow Gorham Road northeast through the town of Gorham. After another 1 mile (1.6 km) of open farmland, NY 247 splits from NY 245 at a point known as Baldwin Corners. While NY 245 continues northeast toward Geneva, NY 247 heads north on a linear north–south alignment. This path takes NY 247 across another 4 miles (6 km) of cultivated fields to the small hamlet of Reed Corners, centered around the junction of NY 247 and County Road 18. Past Reed Corners, NY 247 traverses slightly more populated areas as it enters the town of Hopewell, the last town along the route. NY 247 ends just 0.5 miles (0.8 km) north of the town line at an intersection with US 20 and NY 5 3 miles (5 km) southeast of Canandaigua.

== History ==
The portion of modern NY 247 between Potter and Rushville was originally designated as part of NY 52, an east–west route extending from Dansville to Geneva via Naples and Middlesex, in the mid-1920s. From Naples to Geneva, NY 52 mostly followed what is now NY 245. NY 52 was realigned in the late 1920s to follow current NY 245 from Middlesex to Rushville, bypassing modern NY 364 and NY 247. Although all of what is now NY 247 was state-maintained by 1926, no other designations were assigned to the highway until the 1930 renumbering of state highways in New York.

In the 1930 renumbering, NY 247 was assigned to what is now NY 53 between Prattsburgh and Naples. The current alignment of NY 247 was simultaneously designated as the northernmost portion of NY 53, which originally followed a series of north–south roads between Prattsburgh and Potter. NY 53 was realigned in the early 1940s to follow NY 247 from Prattsburgh to Naples. As part of the change, NY 247 was reassigned to the portion of NY 53's former alignment north of NY 364 in Potter.

== Major intersections ==
County	Location	mi	km	Destinations	Notes
Yates	Potter	0.00	0.00	NY 364	Southern terminus
Yates	Rushville	3.93	6.32	NY 245 south	Southern terminus of NY 245 / NY 247 overlap
Ontario	Gorham	5.06	8.14	NY 245 north	Northern terminus of NY 245 / NY 247 overlap
Ontario	Hopewell	11.08	17.83	US 20 / NY 5	Northern terminus
1.000 mi = 1.609 km; 1.000 km = 0.621 mi: Concurrency terminus
