= Gorham, New York =

- Town
- Location within the state of New York
- Coordinates: 42°48′32″N 77°13′18″W
- Country: United States
- State: New York
- County: Ontario

Government
  - Type: Town Council
  - Town Supervisor: Dale Stell (R)
  - Town Council: Members' List: • Chase Brown; • Phil Curtis; • Chrissy Watkins; •

Area
  - Total: 53.17 sq mi (137.71 km^{2})
  - Land: 48.85 sq mi (126.53 km^{2})
  - Water: 4.31 sq mi (11.17 km^{2})
- Elevation: 1,076 ft (328 m)

Population (2020)
  - Total: 4,130 ▼
  - Estimate (2021): 4,124
  - Density: 87.5/sq mi (33.78/km^{2})
- Time zone: UTC-5 (Eastern (EST))
  - Summer (DST): UTC-4 (EDT)
- ZIP code: 14461
- Area code: 585
- FIPS code: 36-29531
- GNIS feature ID: 0979007
- Website: https://www.gorham-ny.com/

Gorham is a town in Ontario County, New York, United States. The population was 4,130 at the 2020 census. The town is named after Nathaniel Gorham.

The Town of Gorham is at the southern border of the county, southeast of Canandaigua.

== History ==
The first buildings in what would become Gorham were constructed in November of 1796, under a charter from Ontario County for "East Town." The town of "Easton" was formally organized on April 7, 1797.

The town changed its name to "Lincoln" in 1806, and adopted the current name, the name of an early proprietor, in 1807. Part of Gorham was taken in 1822 to form the Town of Hopewell. More territory, including the east shore of Canandaigua Lake, was added to Gorham in 1824.

A fire consumed much of Gorham village in 1868.

== Geography ==
According to the United States Census Bureau, the town has a total area of 53.2 square miles (138 km^{2}), of which 48.9 square miles (127 km^{2}) is land and 4.3 square miles (11 km^{2}) (8.10%) is water.

The southern town line is the border of Yates County, and the western town line is marked by Canandaigua Lake, one of the Finger Lakes.

New York State Route 245 intersects New York State Route 247 northeast of Rushville. NY-247 and New York State Route 364 are north–south highways in the town, but NY-364 is farther west, near Canandaigua Lake.

== Demographics ==
Historical population
Census	Pop.	Note	%±
1820	3,991		—
1830	2,977		−25.4%
1840	2,779		−6.7%
1850	2,615		−5.9%
1860	2,537		−3.0%
1870	2,389		−5.8%
1880	2,521		5.5%
1890	2,203		−12.6%
1900	2,131		−3.3%
1910	2,134		0.1%
1920	1,936		−9.3%
1930	1,843		−4.8%
1940	2,027		10.0%
1950	2,354		16.1%
1960	2,664		13.2%
1970	3,033		13.9%
1980	3,598		18.6%
1990	3,497		−2.8%
2000	3,776		8.0%
2010	4,247		12.5%
2020	4,130		−2.8%
2021 (est.)	4,124	▼	−0.1%
U.S. Decennial Census

As of the census of 2000, there were 3,776 people, 1,410 households, and 1,036 families residing in the town. The population density was 77.2 inhabitants per square mile (29.8/km^{2}). There were 1,900 housing units at an average density of 38.9 per square mile (15.0/km^{2}). The racial makeup of the town was 98.36% White, 0.37% African American, 0.05% Native American, 0.13% Asian, 0.03% Pacific Islander, 0.21% from other races, and 0.85% from two or more races. Hispanic or Latino of any race were 0.48% of the population.

There were 1,410 households, out of which 32.7% had children under the age of 18 living with them, 60.2% were married couples living together, 8.9% had a female householder with no husband present, and 26.5% were non-families. 19.9% of all households were made up of individuals, and 9.4% had someone living alone who was 65 years of age or older. The average household size was 2.66 and the average family size was 3.05.

In the town, the population was spread out, with 26.3% under the age of 18, 6.8% from 18 to 24, 26.7% from 25 to 44, 26.7% from 45 to 64, and 13.5% who were 65 years of age or older. The median age was 39 years. For every 100 females, there were 97.0 males. For every 100 females age 18 and over, there were 95.0 males.

The median income for a household in the town was $43,138, and the median income for a family was $45,917. Males had a median income of $35,658 versus $23,682 for females. The per capita income for the town was $20,736. About 4.2% of families and 7.0% of the population were below the poverty line, including 9.2% of those under age 18 and 3.2% of those age 65 or over.

== Notable people ==
- Samuel Reed Clark, former Wisconsin State Assemblyman
- William H. Lamport, former US Congressman
- Luman Walters, mentor to Joseph Smith

== Communities and locations in the Town of Gorham ==
- Babbitt Corner – A location in the northeast part of the town.
- Baldwin Corners – A location northeast of Rushville.
- Cottage City – A hamlet on the shore of Canandaigua Lake, south of Crystal Beach on NY-364.
- Crystal Beach – A hamlet (and census-designated place) on the shore of Canandaigua Lake, south of Greens Landing on NY-364.
- Flint Creek – A stream flowing northward past Gorham village.
- Gorham – The hamlet (and census-designated place) of Gorham is near the east town line on NY-245. It was previously called "Bethel," but the current name was adopted in 1856 to match the town's name.
- Granger – A location southwest of Gorham village on NY-245.
- Greens Landing – A hamlet on the shore of Canandaigua Lake on NY-364.
- Mead Corner – A location in the northeast part of the town.
- Reed Corner – A location in the north part of the town on NY-247.
- Rushville – The north part of the Village of Rushville lies within the town and is located on NY-247.
- West River – A stream in the south part of the town, passing Rushville, that eventually enters Canandaigua Lake.
- Wilson Corner – A location east of Cottage City at the junction of NY-247 and Lake to Lake Road.
