= Ontario Pathways Rail Trail =

Rail trail in New York, United States

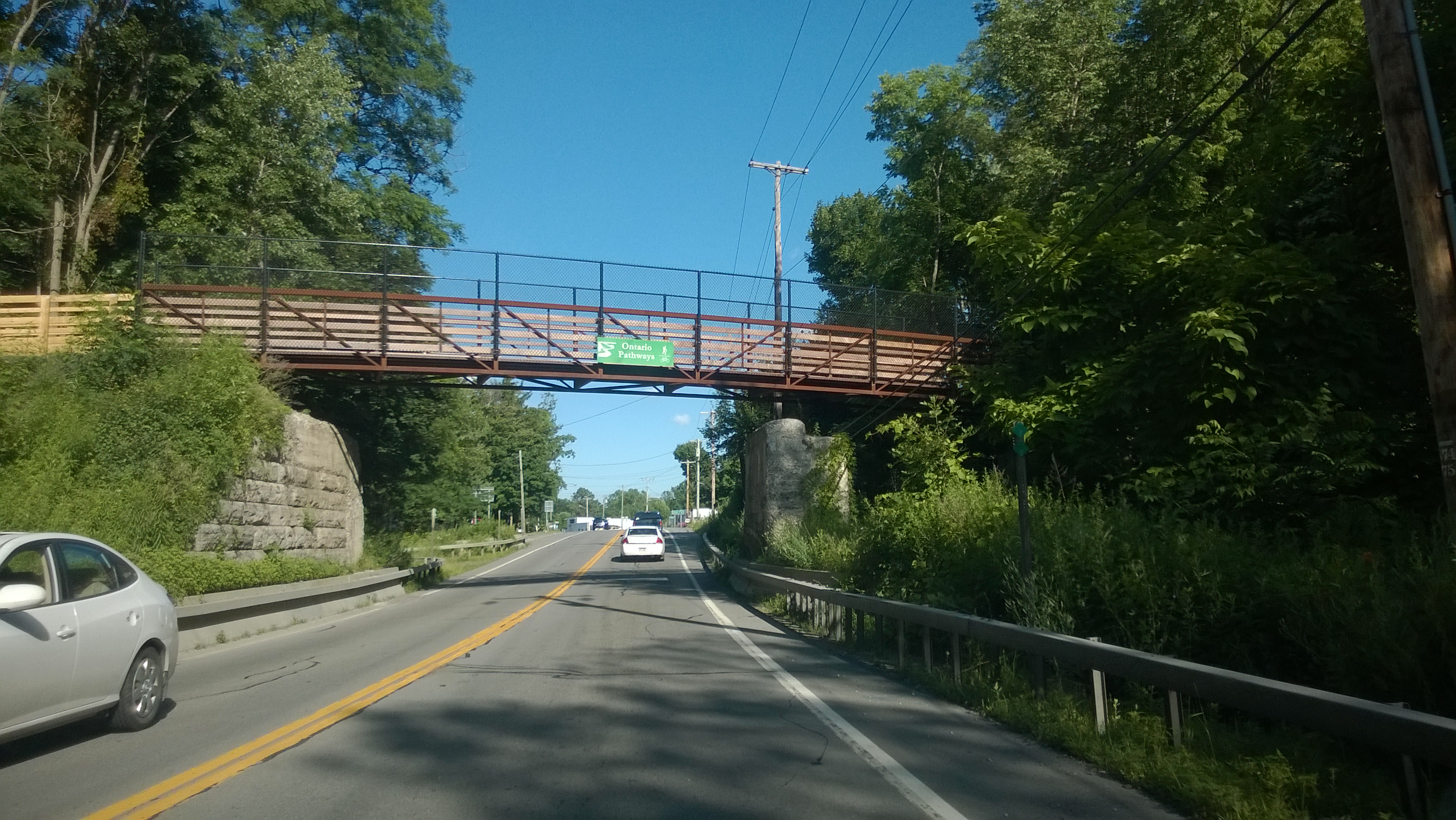
Bridge over Route 5 & 20

Ontario Pathways Rail Trail is a hiking and cycling trail located in Ontario County, New York. The total trail mileage is 23 with pathways branching in two directions. The trail connects Canandaigua, Stanley, and Phelps. In addition to the main hiking and cycling trails, Ontario Pathways includes four loop trails.

The two main pathways of the trail were built over a pair of former Pennsylvania Railroad lines. The trail was severed in June 2010 when an incident involving a piece of agricultural machinery took out a railroad bridge over routes 5 & 20; this was later replaced in 2013 with a simple arched pedestrian bridge.
