= Gorham (hamlet), New York =

Hamlet in New York, United States

Coordinates: 42°47′56″N 77°07′55″W

Gorham is a hamlet (and census-designated place) within the Town of Gorham, in Ontario County, New York, United States. It is located along New York State Route 245. Gorham is situated around Flint Creek. Gorham is a large hamlet with several businesses, including public library and a post office with a zip code of 14461. Gorham is also the location for Gorham Elementary School, one of two elementary schools in the Marcus Whitman Central School District.

The hamlet of Gorham started as a public house erected by Thomas Haistead in the early 19th century. Flint Creek was used to power a grist mill and Craft's saw mill, which was erected in 1808. Gorham soon grew to include a general store, a drug store, a hardware store and a hotel. Most of the business buildings were destroyed by a fire in 1868, however, they were soon replaced.
