= New York State Route 364 =

Highway in New York

New York State Route 364
- Map of Finger Lakes region in central New York with NY 364 highlighted in red

Route information
- Maintained by NYSDOT
- Length: 24.59 mi (39.57 km)
- Existed: 1930–present

Major junctions
- East end: NY 14A in Penn Yan
- North end: US 20 / NY 5 in Canandaigua

Location
- Country: United States
- State: New York
- Counties: Yates, Ontario

Highway system
- New York Highways; Interstate; US; State; Reference; Parkways
← NY 363	→ NY 365
← NY 21	NY 21A	→ NY 22

New York State Route 364 (NY 364) is a state highway located in the Finger Lakes region of New York in the United States. It extends for 24.59 miles (39.57 km) from an intersection with NY 14A in Penn Yan to a junction with the concurrent routes of U.S. Route 20 (US 20) and NY 5 just east of the Canandaigua city limits. NY 364 follows a predominantly east–west alignment from Penn Yan to Middlesex and a north–south routing from Middlesex to Canandaigua, resulting in an L-shaped alignment. As a result, the route is posted as north–south north of Middlesex and east–west east of the hamlet. In the Canandaigua area, the road serves as a connector between US 20 and NY 5, Finger Lakes Community College, and the eastern shore of Canandaigua Lake.

The origins of NY 364 date back to the 1920s when the Middlesex–Potter segment was briefly part of NY 52, the predecessor to today's NY 245. NY 364 was assigned as part of the 1930 renumbering of state highways in New York, but initially went no farther west than Middlesex. North of Middlesex, what is now NY 364 was unnumbered south of North Vine Valley Road and part of New York State Route 21A from there to Canandaigua. NY 364 was extended north to meet NY 21A by the following year. NY 21A was eliminated and partially replaced with an extended NY 364 in the early 1940s.

== Route description ==
=== Penn Yan to Middlesex ===
NY 364 begins at a four-way intersection with NY 14A (Liberty Street) in the northern portion of the village of Penn Yan in Yates County. The route heads west as Maple Avenue, passing north of the Penn Yan Central School District's campus before leaving the village for more rural areas of the town of Benton. NY 364 crosses open farmland and rapidly ascends in elevation as it travels northwestward out of the valley surrounding Keuka Lake. After ascending 400 feet (122 m) in roughly 1.5 miles (2.4 km), the route begins to level off as it heads toward the town of Potter. In Potter, NY 364 turns to face due west, taking on a linear east–west alignment for most of its first 3 miles (5 km) in the town. At the end of the stretch, the road descends approximately 300 feet (91 m) into another valley containing Flint and Nettle Valley Creeks, both of which flow into a large marsh known as Potter Swamp.

Upon crossing Nettle Valley Creek, NY 364 deviates from its east–west alignment and turns to the northwest, with the east–west road continuing as Italy Valley Road. Here, NY 364 runs along the side of the valley for 1 mile (1.6 km), ascending to 966 feet (294 m) before returning to an elevation of 900 feet (274 m) as it crosses Flint Creek and enters the small hamlet of Potter. The road turns to run north–south through the community before turning back to the west north of the hamlet. Outside of Potter, NY 364 runs parallel to a small creek, occupying the base of a small, heavily forested valley created by the waterway. 0.5 miles (0.8 km) from the hamlet, NY 364 meets the southern terminus of NY 247. Due to the terrain surrounding NY 364, NY 247 runs parallel to NY 364 for a short distance as it ascends out of the valley.

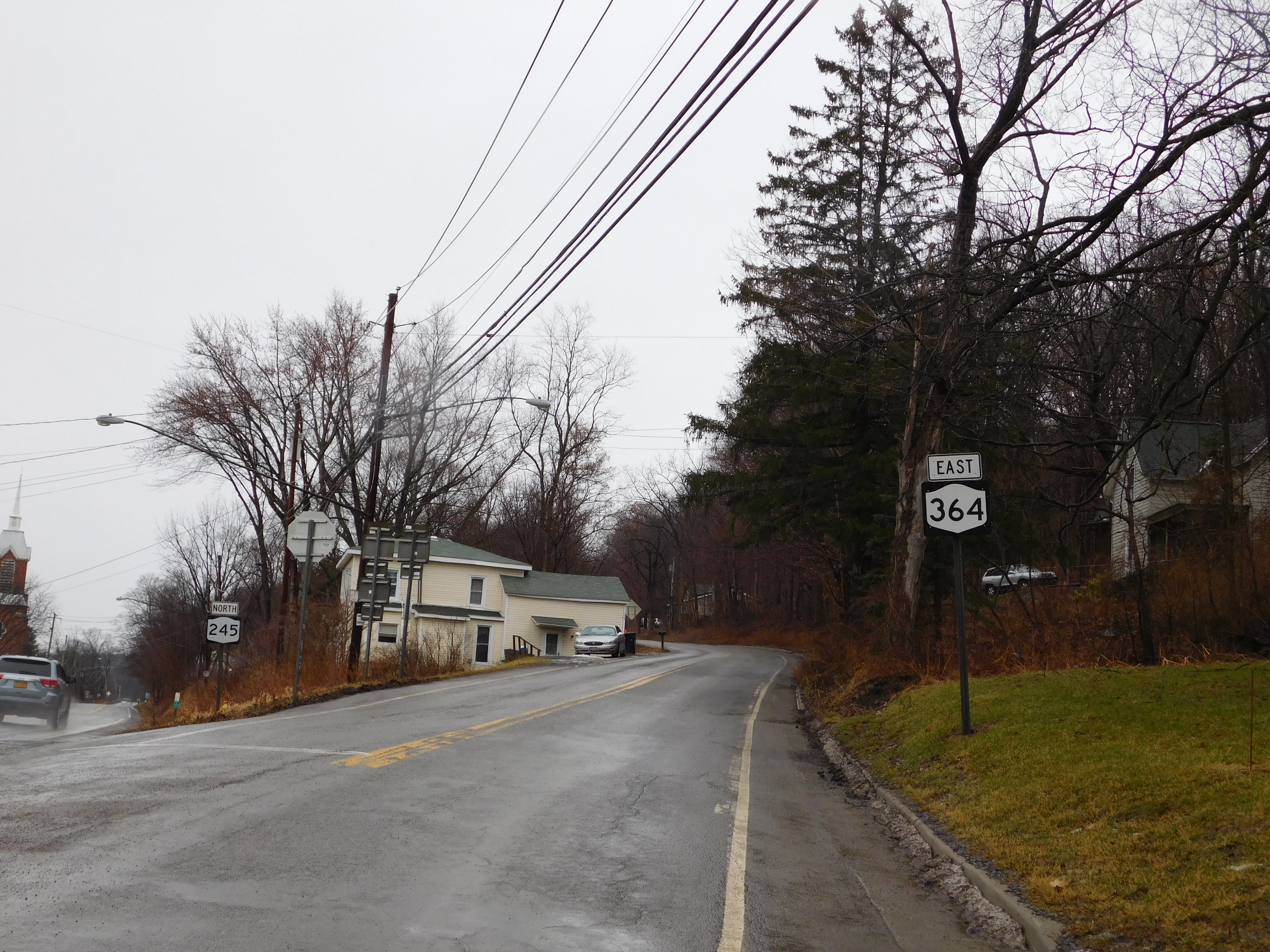
NY 364 at the split from NY 245 in Middlesex

The route follows the isolated valley west into the town of Middlesex, where it ends near an intersection with Roach Road 0.5 miles (0.8 km) from the town line. Past this point, NY 364 curves to the southwest, descending roughly 300 feet (91 m) into another valley created by the West River as it approaches the hamlet of Middlesex on East Avenue. At the foot of the valley in Middlesex, NY 364 intersects NY 245. The two routes overlap for one block to the center of the hamlet, at which point NY 364 leaves NY 245 on Water Street. At the southern terminus of the concurrency, NY 364 shifts from an east–west route to a north–south roadway.

=== Middlesex to Canandaigua ===
After departing NY 245, NY 364 proceeds to the northwest as Water Street, crossing the West River and passing through the remainder of the hamlet before abruptly turning to the north at an intersection with West Avenue on the western edge of Middlesex. NY 364, now named Maple Avenue, ascends the western edge of the valley, climbing 300 feet (91 m) to exit the West River valley and the hamlet of Middlesex. North of the valley, the route traverses less populated areas primarily consisting of farmland. About 2.25 miles (3.62 km) from the hamlet, NY 364 meets North Vine Valley Road, the first of a number of roads linking NY 364 to East Lake Road, a local roadway running parallel to the eastern edge of Canandaigua Lake. North of the intersection, NY 364 turns to the northeast, running parallel to the lake as it crosses into Ontario County.

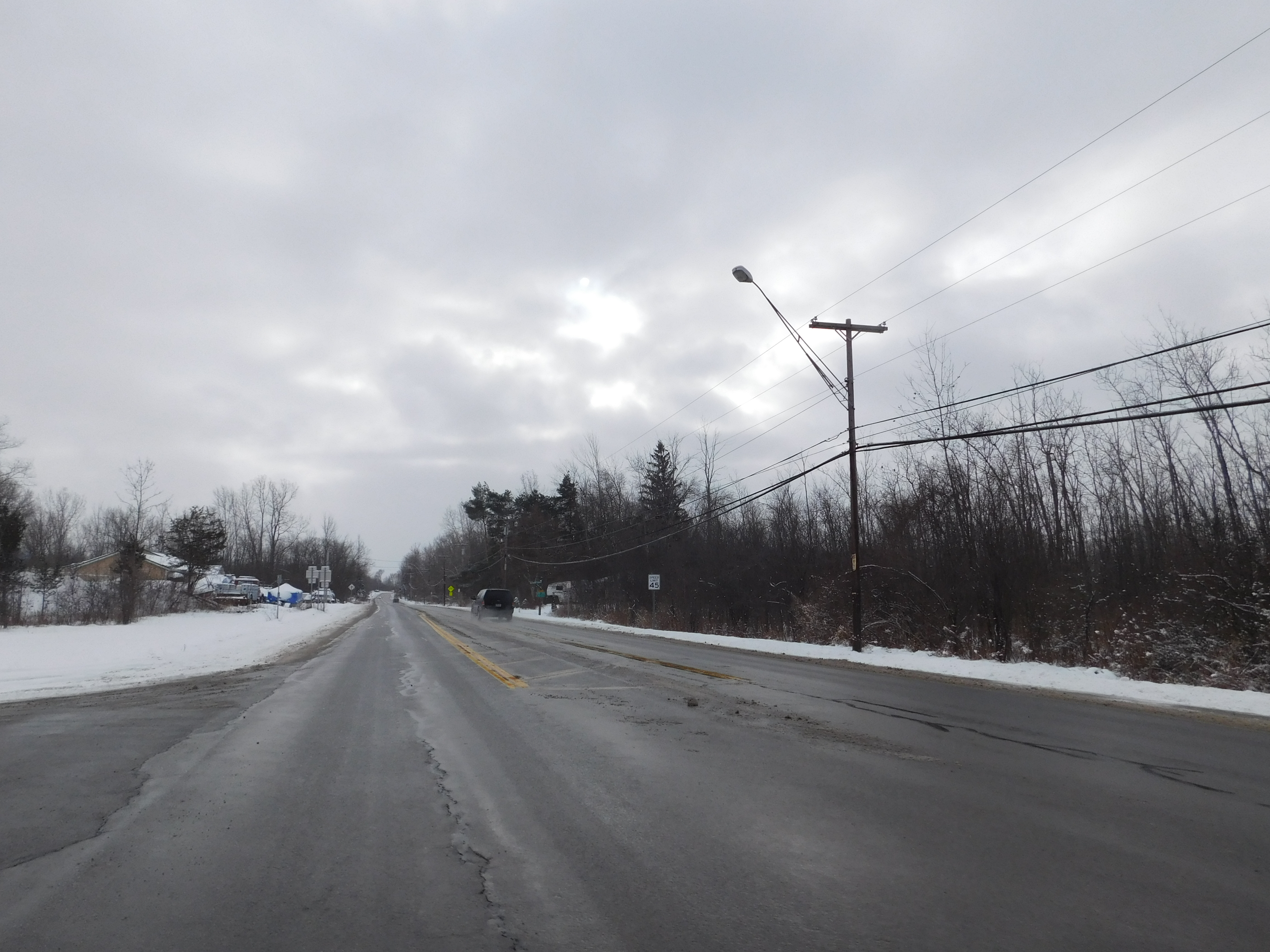
NY 364 southbound at CR 18 in the town of Canandaigua

Now in the town of Gorham, East Lake Road becomes County Road 11 (CR 11). Over the next 1.5 miles (2.4 km), NY 364 and CR 11 slowly converge, with the two finally meeting at a junction just 700 feet (210 m) from the shore of Canandaigua Lake. At this point, NY 364 takes on the East Lake Road name as it becomes the westernmost roadway on Canandaigua Lake's eastern edge. Here, the surroundings around NY 364 change substantially as the route serves a number of seaside homes and communities. North of the intersection, NY 364 heads through the hamlet of Cottage City before intersecting CR 1 north of the community.

The roadway continues north into the town of Canandaigua, with the surroundings initially remaining similar to those in Gorham. 0.5 miles (0.8 km) from the town line, NY 364 separates from Canandaigua Lake, taking a more eastern approach toward the city of Canandaigua. Farther north, East Lake Road meets Lincoln Hill Road (CR 18), the first of two roads connecting NY 364 to the adjacent Finger Lakes Community College (FLCC). East Lake Road continues onward, passing the Canandaigua Country Club before intersecting Lake Shore Drive, the second roadway leading to FLCC, a half-mile north of CR 18. Past Lake Shore Drive, NY 364 enters a much more commercialized area as it approaches Eastern Boulevard (US 20 and NY 5), the city of Canandaigua's main east–west commercial strip. It passes one large shopping plaza before terminating opposite another at a junction with US 20 and NY 5.

== History ==
The portion of modern NY 364 southeast of North Vine Valley Road at Overacker Corners in Middlesex was state-maintained as early as 1926. In the mid-1920s, the segment connecting the hamlets of Middlesex and Potter was designated as part of NY 52, which continued south from Middlesex on what is now NY 245 and north from Potter on current NY 247. This designation was short-lived, however, as NY 52 was realigned in the late 1920s to follow modern NY 245 between Middlesex and Rushville. The former routing of NY 52 from Middlesex to Potter remained unnumbered until the 1930 renumbering of state highways in New York, as did the remainder of what is now NY 364.

In the 1930 renumbering, the segment of modern NY 364 from North Vine Valley Road to Lake Shore Drive (then part of US 20 and NY 5) near Canandaigua was designated as part of NY 21A, an alternate route of NY 21 between the South Bristol hamlet of Woodville and Canandaigua. Between Woodville and Overacker Corners, NY 21A was routed on North Vine Valley Road, South Lake Road, and an unknown road leading south from Vine Valley to Woodville. Also assigned at this time was NY 364, which initially began at NY 245 in Middlesex and ended in Penn Yan. NY 364 was extended northward from Middlesex by the following year to meet NY 21A east of Vine Valley.

NY 21A was truncated northward to Vine Valley c. 1939, separating the route from its parent. The NY 21A designation was eliminated in the early 1940s, at which time the portion of NY 21A's former routing north of Overacker Corners became part of an extended NY 364. The former spur of NY 21A to Vine Valley is now maintained by Yates County as part of CR 10. In the mid-1950s, a new four-lane roadway, Eastern Boulevard, was built north of Lake Shore Drive between South Main Street and the modern-day intersection of Lake Shore and Eastern Boulevard in Hopewell. US 20 and NY 5 were realigned onto the new road while NY 364 was extended north on a newly constructed portion of East Lake Road to meet the bypass.

== Major intersections ==
County	Location	mi	km	Destinations	Notes
Yates	Penn Yan	0.00	0.00	NY 14A	Eastern terminus
Yates	Potter	8.95	14.40	NY 247 north	Southern terminus of NY 247
Yates	Middlesex	12.07	19.42	NY 245 north	Northern terminus of NY 245 / NY 364 overlap
Yates	Middlesex	12.16	19.57	NY 245 south	Southern terminus of NY 245 / NY 364 overlap
Ontario	Town of Canandaigua	24.59	39.57	US 20 / NY 5 – Canandaigua, Geneva	Northern terminus
1.000 mi = 1.609 km; 1.000 km = 0.621 mi: Concurrency terminus
