= New York State Route 246 =

State highway in western New York, US

New York State Route 246
- NY 246 highlighted in red

Route information
- Maintained by NYSDOT
- Length: 10.44 mi (16.80 km)
- Existed: 1930–present

Major junctions
- South end: NY 39 in Perry village
- US 20A in Perry town
- North end: NY 63 in Pavilion

Location
- Country: United States
- State: New York
- Counties: Wyoming, Genesee

Highway system
- New York Highways; Interstate; US; State; Reference; Parkways
← NY 245	→ NY 247

New York State Route 246 (NY 246) is a 10.44-mile-long (16.80 km) north–south state highway located in western New York in the United States. All but 0.09 miles (0.14 km) of the route are located in Wyoming County; the northernmost intersection on the highway is in Genesee County instead. The southern terminus of the route is at an intersection with NY 39 in the village of Perry and its northern terminus is at a junction with NY 63 in the town of Pavilion. NY 246 intersects U.S. Route 20A (US 20A) north of Perry village and also passes through the town of Covington.

The route was assigned as part of 1930 renumbering of state highways in New York to a proposed highway that eventually became what is now NY 39 between Perry and US 20A. At the time, the segment of modern NY 246 south of Perry Center was part of NY 245 while the part north of the hamlet was unnumbered. The alignments of NY 245 and NY 246 north of Perry were swapped c. 1934, and NY 246 was extended northward to its current terminus in Pavilion in the early 1950s.

== Route description ==
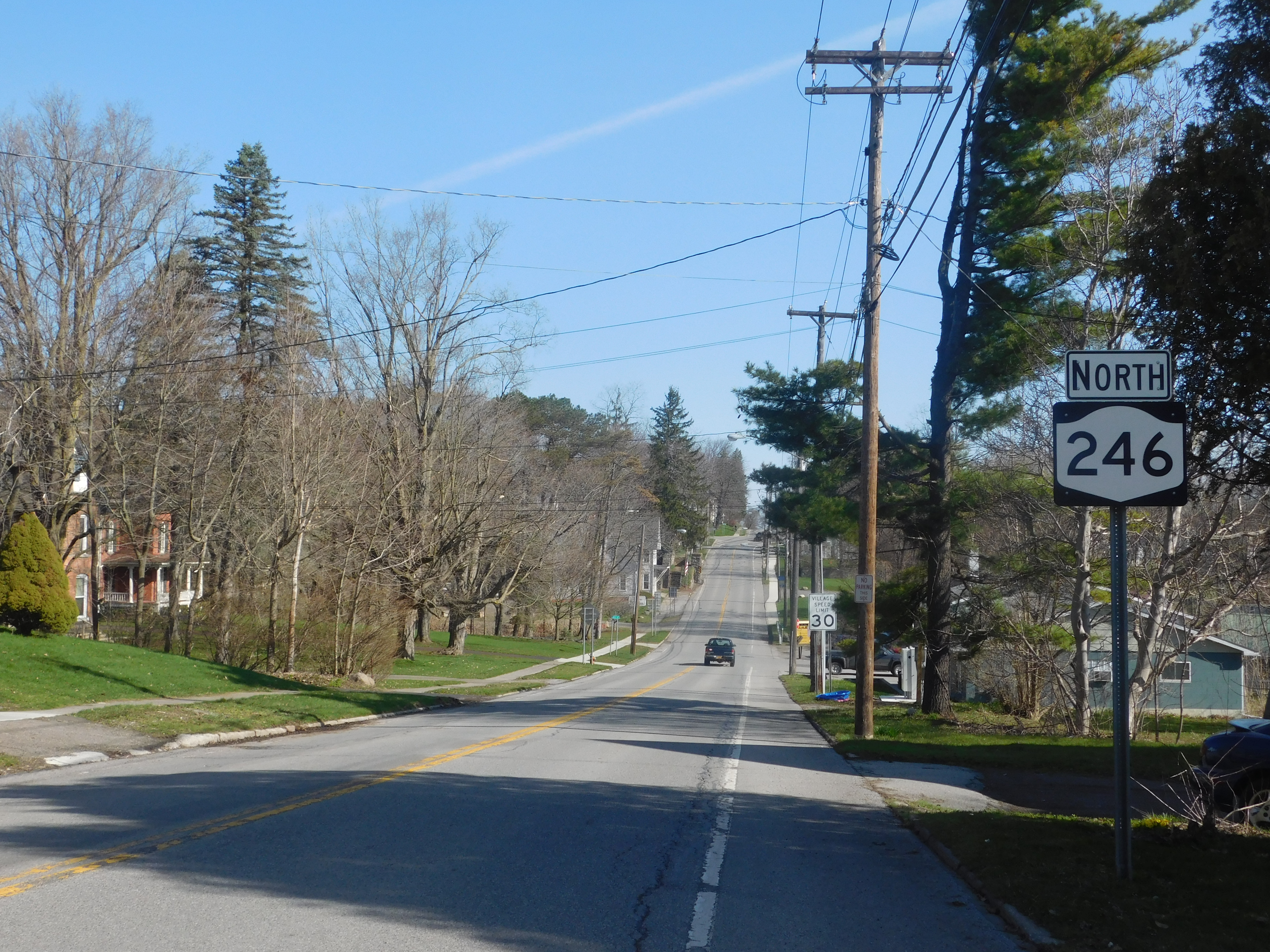
NY 246 through Perry

NY 246 begins at an intersection with NY 39 in the village of Perry, southwest of the community's central business district. The route heads north as Center Street, crossing Silver Lake Outlet and passing by several blocks of homes. After six blocks, the residences give way to open farmland as NY 246 heads out of the village and across the town of Perry. Farther north, the route serves several large farms on its way to the more residential hamlet of Perry Center, where NY 246 meets US 20A at the center of the community. Outside of Perry Center, the farmlands return as the route progresses generally northward, serving farms of varying sizes and connecting to roads of mostly local importance. The surroundings change temporarily at the hamlet of Lagrange 4 miles (6 km) north of Perry Center, at which point NY 246 crosses into the town of Covington.

Across the town line, NY 246, now named Perry Road, initially traverses similar surroundings to those in Perry. About 2 miles (3.2 km) into Covington, NY 246 descends into a small valley surrounding Pearl Creek, which feeds into the larger Oatka Creek 3 miles (5 km) to the west. While in the valley, NY 246 passes through the isolated hamlet of Paines Corner, consisting of little more than a large farm. North of Paines Corner, the route ascends out of the valley and passes between a pair of large hills to access the linear hamlet of Covington, spread out across 0.5 miles (0.8 km) of NY 246. Past Covington, NY 246 traverses more fields on its way to a junction with NY 63. Just before it meets the route, however, NY 246 crosses into the Genesee County town of Pavilion. The route continues north of the county line for just 0.09 miles (0.14 km) before ending at NY 63.

== History ==
The north–south highway connecting the village of Perry to Perry Center was taken over by the state of New York by 1926 and designated as part of NY 245 in the 1930 renumbering of state highways in New York. At the same time, NY 246 was assigned to a proposed highway connecting NY 245 in the village of Perry to NY 36 north of the village of Mount Morris. When construction on the highway began c. 1933, the road was reconfigured on its northeastern end to merge with US 20 (now US 20A) southwest of Leicester instead. The highway, now part of NY 39, was completed by the following year; however, it opened as part of a realigned NY 245 while NY 246 was reassigned to NY 245's former routing along the Perry–Perry Center highway. NY 246 was extended north to NY 63 in Pavilion in the early 1950s.

== Major intersections ==
County	Location	mi	km	Destinations	Notes
Wyoming	Village of Perry	0.00	0.00	NY 39	Southern terminus
Wyoming	Town of Perry	2.27	3.65	US 20A – Warsaw, Geneseo	Hamlet of Perry Center
Genesee	Pavilion	10.44	16.80	NY 63 – Pavilion, Geneseo	Northern terminus
1.000 mi = 1.609 km; 1.000 km = 0.621 mi
