= Stanley, New York =

Hamlet in New York, United States

Coordinates: 42°49′30″N 77°05′45″W

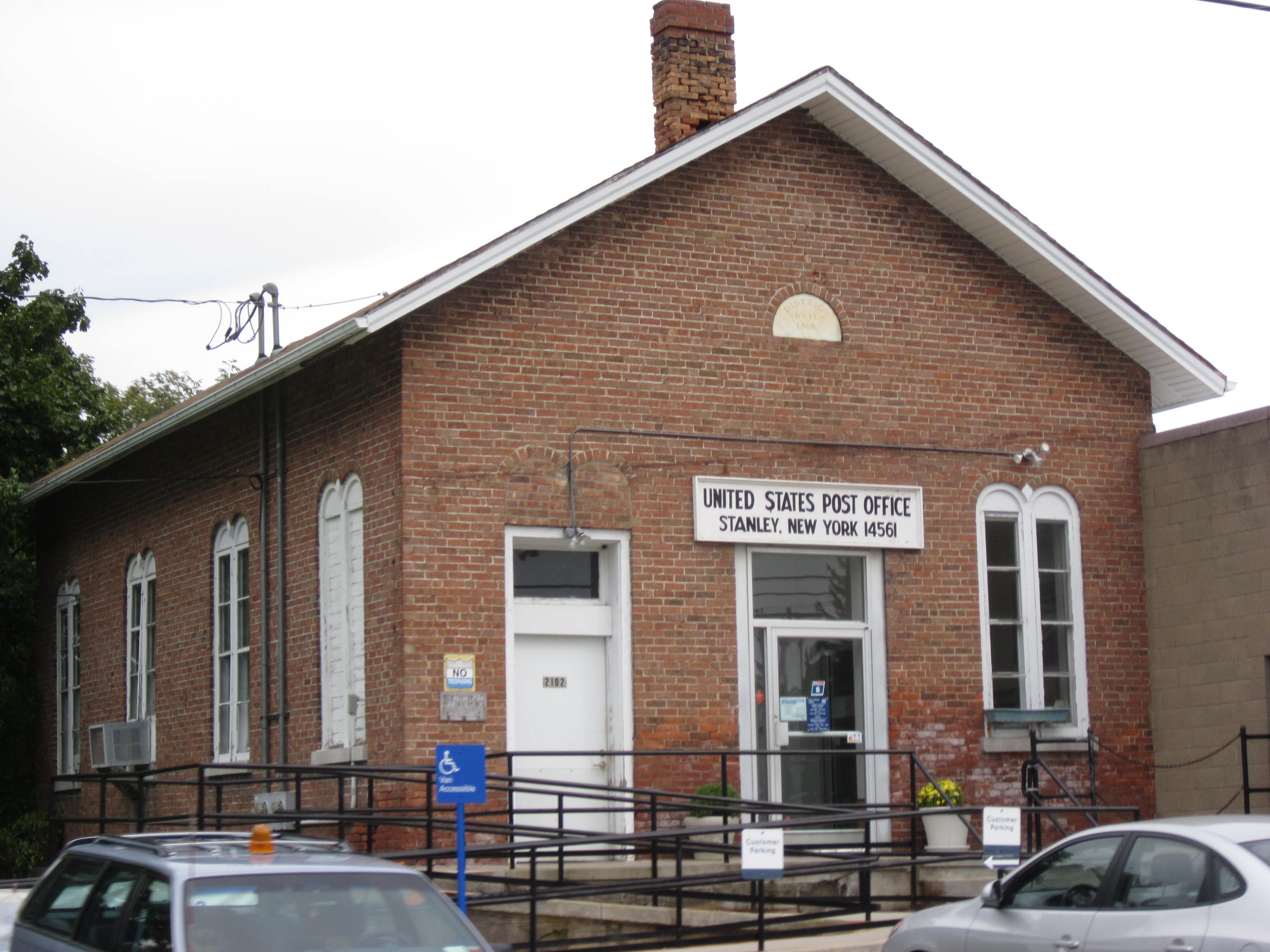
U.S. Post Office, Stanley, New York, September 2011

Stanley is a hamlet in Ontario County, New York, United States, located along New York State Route 245 in the Town of Seneca. It has a post office with a zip code of 14561. The Town of Seneca justice court is located in Stanley. Stanley was formerly known as Stanleys Corners; the nearby hamlet of Hall was also formerly known as Halls Corners. Stanley is known by many as the cabbage capital of the Northeastern United States.
