= Factory Hollow =

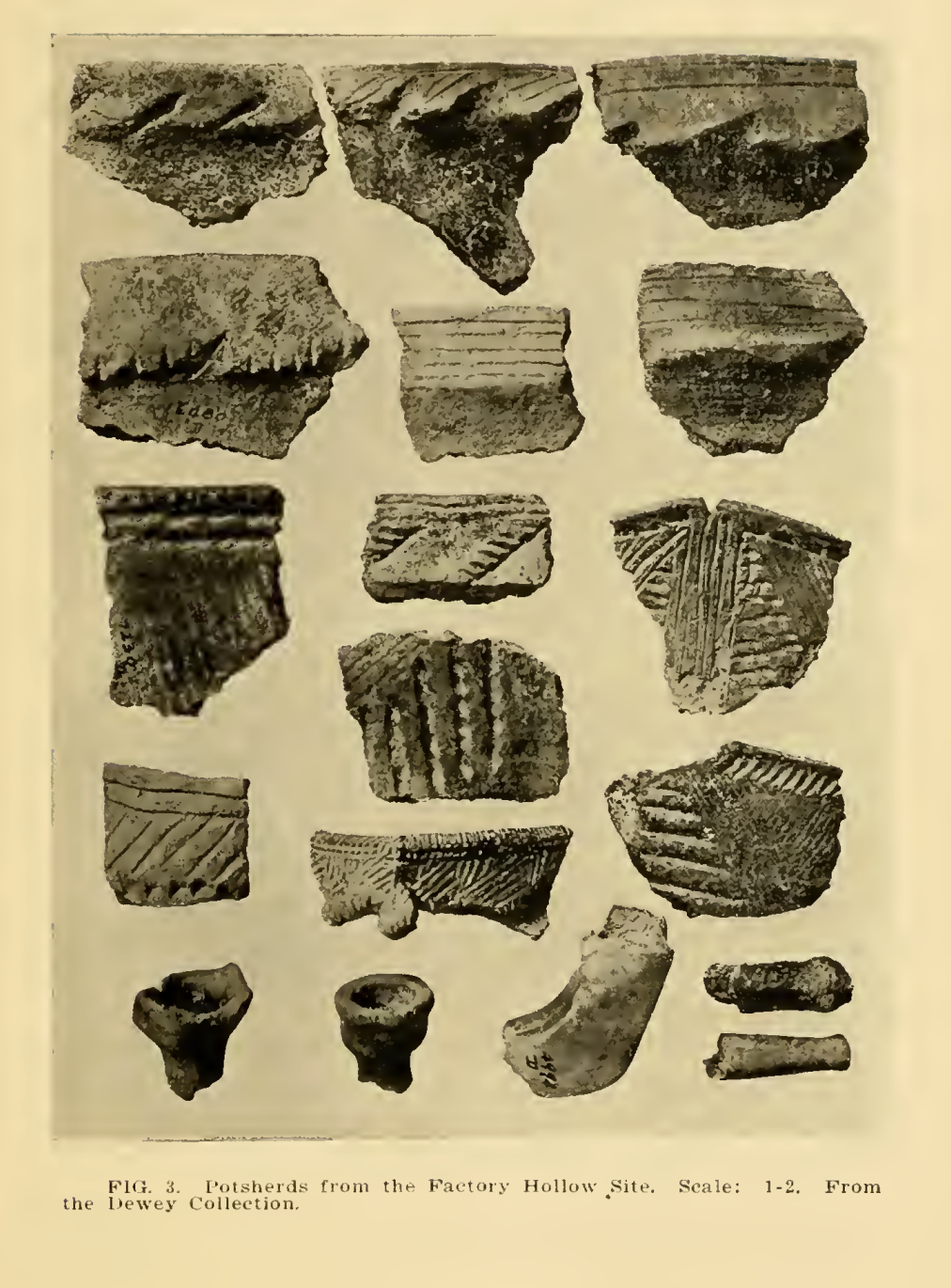
- Potsherds from the Factory Hollow Site
- Cultures: Seneca people
- Location: West Bloomfield, New York

History
- Built: ~ 1597
- Abandoned: ~ 1617

Factory Hollow site is an archaeological site in Ontario County, New York, identified as a contact-period Seneca village. The site was described in detail by Arthur C. Parker in 1919 and has continued to appear in later archaeological scholarship on Seneca chronology, settlement patterns, and the early reception of European trade goods in western New York.

The site is located in the Honeoye Creek/Honeoye outlet corridor near present-day West Bloomfield. In his original study, Parker placed it on a prominent terrace or promontory above the valley and emphasized its position within a broader network of trails and nearby Seneca and earlier Indigenous sites in the Honeoye-Hemlock region. He treated the site as part of a larger landscape that linked the Genesee Valley, Mendon area, Canandaigua trail system, and other settlements in what he called the heart of Seneca country.

Factory Hollow is important in part because it belongs to the period of early European contact. Later archaeological work has used the site as a chronological marker for the later eastern Seneca sequence, with recent radiocarbon-based scholarship placing it roughly in the late sixteenth to early seventeenth century, around 1597–1617. Other scholarship has treated Factory Hollow and the nearby Dutch Hollow site as key evidence for the early spread of Dutch trade goods among the Seneca.

The site has also figured in debates over Seneca chronology based on artifact assemblages. Charles F. Wray’s work on trade beads described Factory Hollow and Dutch Hollow as sites from about 1590–1615 that produced large quantities of glass beads and other European items, suggesting a major expansion in direct trade connections. More recent scholarship has proposed somewhat later dating ranges for Factory Hollow, which reflects broader revisions in northern Iroquoian chronology rather than any dispute over the site’s overall importance.

Although Parker referred to Factory Hollow as a hill-top stronghold, more recent work has noted that no palisade has been identified there, even though the site occupies a steep and defensible promontory. That combination of topography, chronology, and material evidence has made Factory Hollow an important reference point for understanding Seneca settlement, conflict, and exchange during the period just before sustained Dutch colonial trade reshaped the region.
