= Ethel Isabel Moody =

American mathematician (1905–1941)

Ethel Isabel Moody (1905–1941), was an American mathematician, college professor and one of the few women to earn a PhD in math before World War II.

== Early life ==
Moody was born February 9, 1905, into a farming family in the village of Rushville, New York. Her parents were Alice Arminda Stearns and Edward L. Moody, and her older brother was Robert E. Moody.

In 1922, after graduating from high school, Ethel Moody enrolled at Wells College, located about 55 miles from her Rushville home. She graduated in math with high honors in 1926. Wells invited two college professors to conduct the 1926 honors examinations in mathematics and one, Virgil Snyder, noticed Moody's scholarship and invited her to apply to Cornell University in Ithaca, New York, for graduate school on a scholarship, and she accepted.

Under Snyder's direction, Moody completed her thesis at Cornell about algebraic geometry and graduated with her master's degree in 1927. Snyder went on to be instrumental in Moody's life and studies as described by Green:

"During the summer of 1927, Professor T. S. Fiske, professor of mathematics at Columbia University and secretary of the College Entrance Examination Board, asked Snyder to recommend an advanced student to assist in the clerical work and statistical study of the Board's ratings. Snyder proposed Moody, who was appointed, and, as he explained in his February 1930 letter of recommendation to [Eugenie] Morenus, after two weeks of routine work she was offered the position of director of this work, in charge of 80 girls."

== Career ==
She taught at Wells the following academic year before Moody returned to Cornell to study for her Ph.D. She was appointed an Erastus Brooks fellow and, when her first year ended, she was reappointed, which was unusual at that time. Her dissertation, awarded in 1930, was directed by Snyder and titled: A Cremona Group of Order Thirty-two of Cubic Transformations in Three-Dimensional Space. It was published in the American Journal of Mathematics.

Early in 1930, Moody was invited by Eugenie Morenus at Sweet Briar College to join the faculty at that school for women, based in part on the recommendation by Snyder. Moody remained there for three years as a math instructor. In 1933, Moody moved to Pennsylvania State College (now Penn State University) and she remained until her death in 1941.

While there, her publications included reviews and a short note in the Bulletin of the AMS. She was also active at the national science organization for graduate women in science, Sigma Delta Epsilon, a fraternity for graduate women in science, and she served as the group's treasurer in 1939 and 1940.

== Person life ==
In 1939, Moody bought a 1935 Chevrolet Deluxe Coupe for $275. She died on April 11, 1941, from a fractured skull after her vehicle left the highway near Rushville and plunged down an embankment. She was 36 years old.

Her older brother, Robert E. Moody, collected and donated Ethel's papers to Cornell University.
