= Crystal Beach, New York =

- Hamlet
- Location within New York Location within the United States
- Coordinates: 42°48′49″N 77°15′49″W
- Country: United States
- State: New York
- County: Ontario

Area
  - Total: 0.885 sq mi (2.29 km^{2})
  - Land: 0.682 sq mi (1.77 km^{2})
  - Water: 0.203 sq mi (0.53 km^{2})
- Elevation: 699 ft (213 m)

Population (2010)
  - Total: 644
  - Density: 944/sq mi (365/km^{2})
- Time zone: UTC-5 (Eastern (EST))
  - Summer (DST): UTC-4 (EDT)
- Area code: 585
- GNIS feature ID: 947884

Crystal Beach is a hamlet (and census-designated place) in Ontario County, New York, United States. As of the 2020 census, Crystal Beach had a population of 627. The community is located on the eastern shore of Canandaigua Lake and is served by New York State Route 364.

== Geography ==
According to the U.S. Census Bureau, the community has an area of 0.885 square miles (2.29 km^{2}); 0.682 square miles (1.77 km^{2}) of its area is land, and 0.203 square miles (0.53 km^{2}) is water.

== History ==
Before being established as Crystal Beach, the land was originally owned by the Washburn family, who maintained a large grape farm. In 1929, Paul Ritchie, owner of Finger Lakes Company, purchased the farm and the subsequent land. He began planning a large housing development in the area. The company built a grid of roads, and dedicated land for neighborhood parks. 965 30 ft x 80 ft lots were built for housing. Midway through building the new cottages at Crystal Beach, the Great Depression hit, and all development seized. Many of the homes built after the Great Depression were built by non-professional individuals, which is why we see a large variation of style and quality of homes in the Crystal Beach area today.

In 2016, the mean price of all housing units was $267,468.

== Public Parks ==
- Deep Run Park
  - Deep Run Park is Carry In/Carry Out park that is open from Memorial Day to Labor Day. On-duty lifeguards are posted from 10am - 9pm, and features 8 picnic tables, several grills and public restrooms.
- Ontario Beach Park
- Crystal Beach Park
