= Milton Wilson House =

Historic house in New York, United States

- U.S. National Register of Historic Places
- Location within New York Location within the United States
- Location: 28 Gilbert St., Rushville, New York
- Coordinates: 42°45′37″N 77°13′47″W
- Area: less than one acre
- Built: 1906
- Architect: Middlebrook, William S.
- Architectural style: Queen Anne
- MPS: Yates County MPS
- NRHP reference No.: 94000968
- Added to NRHP: August 24, 1994

Milton Wilson House is a historic home located at Rushville in Yates County, New York. It is a Queen Anne style structure built about 1906.

It was listed on the National Register of Historic Places in 1994.
