= Flint Creek (New York) =

- Location of the mouth of the Flint Creek in New York State. Flint Creek (New York) (the United States)

Location
- Country: United States
- State: New York
- Region: Finger Lakes
- Counties: Ontario, Yates, Steuben

Physical characteristics
- Source
  - location: Prattsburgh, Steuben County
  - coordinates: 42°33′34″N 77°18′49″W
- Mouth: Canandaigua Outlet
  - location: Phelps, Ontario County
  - coordinates: 42°57′39″N 77°02′58″W

Flint Creek is a creek in the Finger Lakes region of New York State, located between Canandaigua Lake and Seneca Lake. Flint Creek is part of the Oswego River drainage basin, which ultimately drains to Lake Ontario. It has two head springs in the town of Italy which come together on the floor of Italy Valley. It then flows through the hamlets of Potter, Gorham, and Seneca Castle, and ends in the village of Phelps where it joins the Canandaigua Outlet.

== History ==
The creek was known by the Iroquois as Ax-o-quent-a or Ah-ta-gweh-da-ga, the latter name being translated as "flint stone", with its origins in the Cayuga or Seneca dialect.

The hamlet of Gorham was built in the early 1800s around Flint Creek, with several mills using the creek for power.

A very large area of muckland used for vegetable crop farming was created by clearing and draining a swamp along Flint Creek located in the town of Potter. Flint Creek flows through the middle of the area and is used for irrigation. The largest portion of this muckland is run by Torrey Farms of Elba.

== Recreation ==
A part of Flint Creek known as Phelps Run is used for whitewater rafting and kayaking and has class II, III, and IV rapids. The run is three miles (4.8 km) long and has an average gradient of 50 feet per mile (9.5 m/km).
