= Potter, New York =

- Town
- Location in Yates County and the state of New York.
- Coordinates: 42°43′10″N 77°10′59″W
- Country: United States
- State: New York
- County: Yates

Area
  - Total: 37.24 sq mi (96.45 km^{2})
  - Land: 37.24 sq mi (96.45 km^{2})
  - Water: 0 sq mi (0.00 km^{2})
- Elevation: 889 ft (271 m)

Population (2010)
  - Total: 1,865
  - Estimate (2016): 1,842
  - Density: 49/sq mi (19.1/km^{2})
- Time zone: UTC−5 (Eastern (EST))
  - Summer (DST): UTC−4 (EDT)
- FIPS code: 36-59597
- GNIS feature ID: 0979391
- Website: https://potterny.gov/

Potter is a town in Yates County, New York, United States. The Town of Potter is located in the northwest part of the county and is south of Canandaigua. The population was 1,865 at the 2010 census.

== History ==
Potter was founded on April 26, 1832, when the town separated from nearby the Town of Middlesex. Previously, the region as a whole was known as District of Augusta. The town was initially known as "Potter's Town," as the 42,430 acres (171.7 km^{2}) area had been purchased by Arnold Potter a son of Judge William Potter. In December 1856, and additional 1.5 square miles (3.9 km^{2}) were taken from Middlesex (Modern Potter contains 34.5 square miles (89 km^{2})).

Early settlers of the time included Rowes Perry, Benjamin Brown, Jesse Brown and Joshua Brown, Elias Gilbert, Jabez French, Abraham Lane, Isaac Lane and Jacob Lane, Francis Briggs and Peleg Briggs Jr., Edward Craft, David Southerland and John Griffin. Around 1805, Griffin and Riggs operated an ashery store and a distillery north of Nettle Valley, on what would eventually become the Erwin Wells farm in 1929. Riggs left, and in 1812, Griffin sold the operation to his brother-in-law, Richard M. Williams. Williams became an associate judge of Yates County; he largely concentrated on the manufacture of potash and whisky, and died on June 4, 1837. Williams' son, Richard H. Williams, was elected to the state senate in 1845, and served for two years before his term was cut short by the adoption of the 1846 constitution.

Luke Conley also built a distillery in Nettle Valley some time after his arrival in Potter in 1805. Around 1810, he sold this building to Arnold Potter, and it was moved to Potter's Hollow, or Yatesville. For five years, he worked for Judge Potter in payment for 90 acres (360,000 m^{2}) on lot four of the second range. Mr. Conley was also associated with William B. Rochester and aided in laying the foundation for the first mill in Rochester, New York.

In Potter Center around 1790, there was at first a double log tavern, operated by one Bingham, believed to be Col. Luther Bingham, which was located just north of the hamlet on what is now Middle Rd. The tavern sat on the knoll on the east side of the road and just north of the Potter Center Schoolhouse #11. Mr. Bingham operated the tavern even before wagon roads were open. He was succeeded by Alben Darby who remained many years and died there. Many older documents refer to "Darby's Corners," which was the intersection of what we now call Simmons, Mothersell and Middle Rd. to the north of Potter Center.

In 1798, Lindsey Warfield established the "Warfield Neighborhood" which included, in part, land that would later become the township of Middlesex. Mr. Warfield's residence was on a farm previously owned by Benjamin Watkins. His house was at the southeast corner of Ward Simmons and NY Route 247. The foundation of a house still remains there. His son, Lindsey D. Warfield, is listed in the 1876 Yates County Atlas at that site. The house burned in 1897 and was previously used as a tavern and public meeting place for town meetings. Other early settlers in the Warfield Neighborhood were a Mr. Wesson, William Foster, and Abraham Florence. Others were James Southerland, Jacob Voorhees, Peter Lamoreaux, Henry VanWormer who in 1796 settled on the Darwin B. Holbrook farm, which is now owned by the Pendleton family. Hendricks younger brother Jan VanWormer settled in about 1801.

Dr. Frederic Dutch was a native of Germany. He came to Potter around 1800 and settled on 150 acres (0.61 km^{2}) that eventually became the hamlet of Voak or The Dutch Settlement Dr. Dutch was a German Lutheran and helped to organize the German Lutheran Church at Voak. It is important to distinguish that it was not a "Dutch settlement." It was a settlement of German Lutherans. At that location there is mention of the "German Meeting House" in 1816, where a Christopher Bergstresser settled near.

Other smaller settlements were Moontown and Hoardtown, which were basically the same location. These were not established villages. They were settlements highly populated by the Moon and Hoard family. It was basically the area of the intersections of Voorhees, West Swamp and Reynolds roads. There was a church on the north side of the intersection of Voorhees and West Swamp as early as 1810. The 1876 Yates County Atlas has it located on what now is the Artlip property. The school was originally located on the southeast corner. Later it was on the southwest corner.

In 1802 Dr. Jareb Dyer purchased 1,008 acres (4.08 km^{2}) that extended from the Willis Dyer Corners, west of the road, north beyond what would later become Potter Center. At that time there were no houses nearer than Warfield's Corners to the north and Aberham Lane to the south. Samuel Wyman settled in Nettle Valley in 1809 where Enoch Bordwell and George Green built a sawmill and a log house.

Sanford Strobridge came to Potter in 1826 and at first settled one mile (1.6 km) north of Potter Center. He was a wheelwright and a chair maker. In 1838 he resided in Potter Center and owned a gristmill known as the "Gully Mill" located at the southeast corner of Hagerty Rd. and Rt. 364. His son George would later operate the gristmill. The foundation of that mill can still be found. Arnold Potter, a son of Judge William Potter built the first sawmill in 1794 at Potter Center. Sanford had eleven children. Sanford D. Strobridge; Lyman H. Strobridge, who planted the first vineyard in Potter; Samuel G. Strobridge, who lived where the old Olsen Farm is; George W. Strobridge, who was a wagon maker; and William M. Strobridge, who was a soldier killed in the American Civil War. The carriage or wagon shop owned by George W. Strobridge was located at the point where West Swamp Rd. and Rt. 364 meet. The carriage shop was a three-story building that was later opened in 1928 as the Blodgett Bean House. Still later that same building was used as a feed mill outlet for a milling company based in Rushville. It was torn down in 1968. Directly behind his wagon shop was a blacksmith shop belonging to Eben and Thomas Finch in 1825 and later. It was also a three-story building with a planked incline on the north side.

The Strobridge sawmill site at Hagerty Rd and the grist mill further down stream were driven by water from Mill Brook. When the mills were in operation, they made use of a dike west of Hagerty Rd. that must have also served as a bridge for that same road. The dike held the water back to the marsh in the gully towards Middlesex.

Another early mill was the sawmill that was upstream from the current Tony Hiler residence. This saw mill, based on location, was likely converted from the early grist mill shown in early maps. It was said to have wooden gears and no metal. Some of the beams and siding of the mill were used by Tony Hiler to repair his house, and make the lean-to additions. According to a conversation between Carl Simmons and Tony Hiler, the Simmons, Hiler and George Clark house were built from the wood cut at this mill. The Hiler house was built in 1850. The old or main part of the Simmons home was built in 1831. This is believed to be the sawmill referred to in a 1913 newspaper as being operated by Culver, Barber and Barrett. As early as 1868 the assessment records show the mill belonging to Barber and Burnett. By 1874 it was registered as belonging to Oscar Burnett. At some point it was also used as a feed mill.

In 1825, Milton Finch bought a lot from Henry Husted and established a public house, or tavern, and a blacksmith shop in Potter Center which he and his father, Ebenezer Finch ran. The tavern was located where the McDonald Hotel stood. It was first known as Finch's Tavern. Cleveland's book states that he was succeeded by Mark Weare, and Weare by Peleg Thomas. In 1879, the tavern burned and was later replaced by the McDonald Hotel. On the same night the store of John W. Durham and the George Fitzwater building also burned.

About 1836, Cyrus Daines, James Stout and one Silvernail purchased land in Potter Center off Henry Husted and each established a business and a residence. These were the first buildings in Potter Center. Daines opened a blacksmith shop, Stout, a shoe shop and Silvernail, a tailor shop. The first store was kept by James Turner who was succeeded by Cyrus Daines who continued until his death in 1870. Richard H. Williams built a house and store, which was long occupied by Daines. The 1876 Atlas shows that Daines's store was on the east side of the road across from the hotel. The garage owned by Henry Eckert was in Cyrus Dains's old store, which burned in 1931.

Peleg Thomas built a store on the west side of the road, which was later used as a Union Store. In 1836 in Potter Center there was a Methodist church, a Baptist church, two blacksmith shops, two wagon shops, one harness shop, other mechanics and one store. In 1928 James Blodgett opened a bean plant at the location of the old Aaron Gleason and Hobart carriage shop. The Aaron Gleason and Hobart carriage shop was the same building as the previous George Strobridge carriage shop.

A Post Office was established in Potter Center around 1835. It was located in several places, usually at the store of whoever was appointed Postmaster. Richard M. Williams was the first postmaster. It was his work that established a route from Canandaigua through Rushville, Potter, Naples, Blood's Corners, Liberty, and Prattsburg. He had stores at most of these locations.< The James Hobart House, Arnold Potter House, and Yatesville Methodist Church and the Roundstone Schoolhouse are listed on the National Register of Historic Places.

== Geography ==
According to the United States Census Bureau, the town has a total area of 37.2 square miles (96 km^{2}), all land. The northern town line is the border of Ontario County. The town is located in the Finger Lakes region, north of Keuka Lake. New York State Route 247 intersects New York State Route 364 north of the hamlet of Potter Center. Located in Potter is a 2,000-acre (8.1 km^{2}) muckland, which is primarily owned by Torrey Farms.

== Demographics ==
Historical population
Census	Pop.	Note	%±
1840	2,245		—
1850	2,194		−2.3%
1860	2,151		−2.0%
1870	1,970		−8.4%
1880	1,940		−1.5%
1890	1,680		−13.4%
1900	1,520		−9.5%
1910	1,495		−1.6%
1920	1,200		−19.7%
1930	1,190		−0.8%
1940	1,109		−6.8%
1950	1,157		4.3%
1960	1,106		−4.4%
1970	1,082		−2.2%
1980	1,436		32.7%
1990	1,617		12.6%
2000	1,830		13.2%
2010	1,865		1.9%
2016 (est.)	1,842		−1.2%
U.S. Decennial Census

As of the census of 2000, there were 1,830 people, 583 households, and 464 families residing in the town. The population density was 49.1 inhabitants per square mile (19.0/km^{2}). There were 627 housing units at an average density of 16.8 per square mile (6.5/km^{2}). The racial makeup of the town was 97.32% White, 0.44% African American, 0.27% Native American, 0.55% Asian, 0.60% from other races, and 0.82% from two or more races. Hispanic or Latino of any race were 1.58% of the population.

There were 583 households, out of which 43.2% had children under the age of 18 living with them, 63.5% were married couples living together, 11.8% had a female householder with no husband present, and 20.4% were non-families. 14.6% of all households were made up of individuals, and 5.1% had someone living alone who was 65 years of age or older. The average household size was 3.10 and the average family size was 3.42.

In the town, the age distribution of the population shows 34.9% under the age of 18, 6.8% from 18 to 24, 28.9% from 25 to 44, 21.0% from 45 to 64, and 8.3% who were 65 years of age or older. The median age was 33 years. For every 100 females, there were 102.0 males. For every 100 females age 18 and over, there were 97.2 males.

The median income for a household in the town was $42,784, and the median income for a family was $47,188. Males had a median income of $31,111 versus $22,500 for females. The per capita income for the town was $16,696. About 8.6% of families and 9.7% of the population were below the poverty line, including 13.2% of those under age 18 and 2.7% of those age 65 or over.

== Communities and locations in the Town of Potter ==
- Cole Corners – A location in the northeast corner of the town on County Road 4, northeast of East Potter.
- East Potter – A hamlet in the northeast corner of the town.
- Flint Creek – An important stream flowing through the town.
- Potter Center – The hamlet of Potter Center is on NY-364 by Flint Creek in the southwest part of the town.
- Rushville – The south part of the Village of Rushville is by the north town line on NY-247.
- Voak – A hamlet in the northeast corner of the town on County Road 27, southeast of East Potter.
- Yatesville – A hamlet in the southeast corner of the town.
