= Geneva (town), New York =

Geneva, New York
- Town
- Seal

- Location within the state of New York
- Coordinates: 42°49′44″N 76°59′35″W
- Country: United States
- State: New York
- County: Ontario

Government
  - Type: Town Council
  - Town Supervisor: Mark Venuti (D)
  - Town Council: Members' List: • Anthony Capozzi (R); • Rick Larsen (R); • George E. Smith (R); • Patrick K. Riley (R)

Area
  - Total: 19.2 sq mi (49.8 km^{2})
  - Land: 19.2 sq mi (49.8 km^{2})
  - Water: 0 sq mi (0.0 km^{2})
- Elevation: 610 ft (186 m)

Population (2020)
  - Total: 3,478 ▲
  - Density: 181/sq mi (69.8/km^{2})
- Time zone: UTC-5 (Eastern (EST))
  - Summer (DST): UTC-4 (EDT)
- ZIP code: 14456
- Area code: 315
- FIPS code: 36-28651
- GNIS feature ID: 0978993
- Website: Town of Geneva

Geneva is a town in Ontario County, New York, United States. The population was 3,478 at the 2020 census. The actual source of the name is ambiguous.

The Town of Geneva is in the southeastern part of the county and borders the City of Geneva.

Geneva is known for being the home of the New York State Agricultural Experiment Station run by Cornell University.

== History ==
The town is situated in the territory of the historic Seneca, who had an important village at Kanadaseaga ("Seneca Castle"), at the north end of Seneca Lake. This village was fortified during the Colonial Period as a defense against the French and was later used as a British stronghold during the American Revolution. It was destroyed by the Sullivan Expedition.

Post-revolution settlement began around 1788. The town was established from part of the Town of Seneca in 1872.

Seth Reed and his family settled here and owned an 18-mile tract of land in Ontario County between 1787 and 1795 before becoming the earliest settlers of Erie, Pennsylvania. Colonel Reed had been involved in the Battle of Bunker Hill and the Canada campaign while serving in the Continental Army in the American Revolutionary War. His latter experiences in this region of New York may have attracted him to Ontario County and Geneva.

In 1806, the village called Geneva began to set itself apart from the town and was incorporated as a village in 1812. A new charter making Geneva a first class village was granted in 1871.

The loss of this territory to the City of Geneva made the town the smallest in the county.

== Geography ==
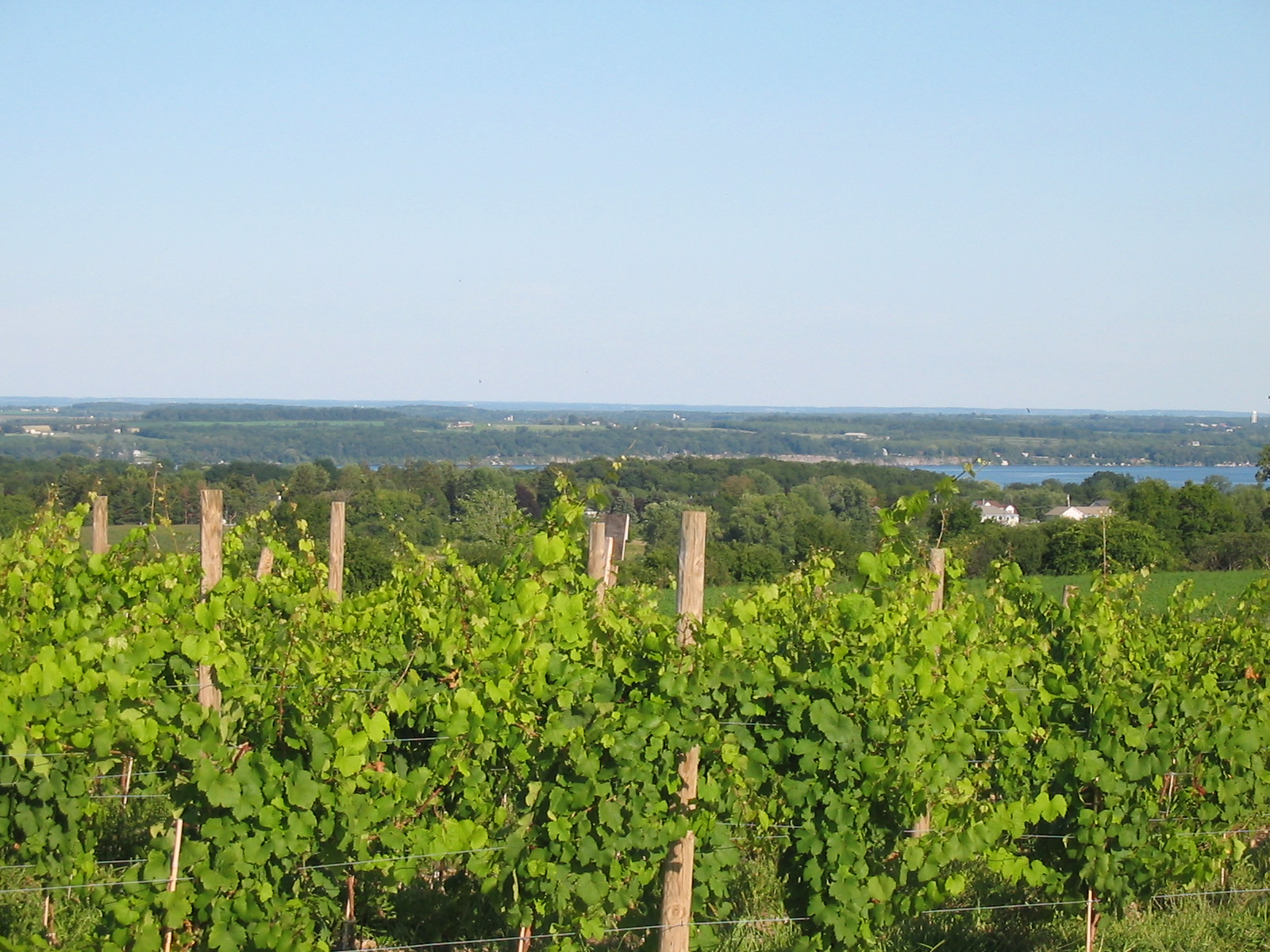
Vineyard in the Town of Geneva

According to the United States Census Bureau, the town has a total area of 19.1 square miles (49.5 km^{2}), of which 19.1 square miles (49.5 km^{2}) is land and 0.0 square mile (0.0 km^{2}) (0.05%) is water.

The southern town line is the border of Yates County and the eastern town boundary is the border of Seneca County. Part of the town is on the northwestern shore of Seneca Lake, one of the Finger Lakes.

US 20 is an east-west highway, and NY 14 and 14A are north-south. NY 245 is an east-west highway in the south part of the town.

== Demographics ==
Historical population
Census	Pop.	Note	%±
1880	7,412		—
1890	1,320		−82.2%
1900	1,091		−17.3%
1910	1,086		−0.5%
1920	1,251		15.2%
1930	1,327		6.1%
1940	1,436		8.2%
1950	1,771		23.3%
1960	2,603		47.0%
1970	2,781		6.8%
1980	3,077		10.6%
1990	2,967		−3.6%
2000	3,289		10.9%
2010	3,291		0.1%
2020	3,478		5.7%
2021 (est.)	3,493		0.4%
U.S. Decennial Census

As of the census of 2000, there were 3,289 people, 1,416 households, and 900 families residing in the town. The population density was 172.2 inhabitants per square mile (66.5/km^{2}). There were 1,532 housing units at an average density of 31.0 persons/km^{2} (80.2 persons/sq mi). The racial makeup of the town was 93.65% White, 2.43% African American, 0.06% Native American, 1.73% Asian, 0.03% Pacific Islander, 0.52% from other races, and 1.58% from two or more races. 1.70% of the population were Hispanic or Latino of any race.

There were 1,416 households, out of which 24.2% had children under the age of 18 living with them, 54.9% were married couples living together, 6.6% had a woman whose husband does not live with her, and 36.4% were non-families. 31.4% of all households were made up of individuals, and 16.6% had someone living alone who was 65 years of age or older. The average household size was 2.32 and the average family size was 2.95.

In the town, the population was spread out, with 22.1% under the age of 18, 5.1% from 18 to 24, 23.5% from 25 to 44, 28.9% from 45 to 64, and 20.4% who were 65 years of age or older. The median age was 45 years. For every 100 females, there were 93.9 males. For every 100 females age 18 and over, there were 89.6 males.

The median income for a household in the town was $44,234, and the median income for a family was $58,350. Males had a median income of $39,186 versus $23,108 for females. The per capita income for the town was $22,990. 3.4% of the population and 1.8% of families were below the poverty line. Out of the total people living in poverty, 3.6% were under the age of 18 and 0.0% were 65 or older.

== Communities and locations in the Town of Geneva ==
- Billsboro – A hamlet on NY-14 on the shore of Seneca Lake, south of the City of Geneva.
- Billsboro Corners – A hamlet near the center of the town on County Road 6, west of Billsboro.
- Border City – A hamlet by the east town line, east of the City of Geneva.
- Clarks Point – A projection into Lake Seneca north of Billsboro.
- Kashong Point – A projection into Seneca Lake by the south town line.
- Lenox Park – A hamlet west of the City of Geneva on US-20.
- Pre-Emption – A hamlet northwest of the City of Geneva on County Road 4.

== Notes ==
- Turner, Eramus (1909). Pioneer History of the Holland Purchase of Western New York. Volume II. p. 319.
