= Rushville, New York =

- Village
- Location in Yates County and the state of New York.
- Coordinates: 42°45′40″N 77°13′34″W
- Country: United States
- State: New York
- Counties: Yates, Ontario
- Settled: 1790
- Incorporated: April 24, 1866
- Named for: Benjamin Rush

Area
  - Total: 0.68 sq mi (1.75 km^{2})
  - Land: 0.68 sq mi (1.75 km^{2})
  - Water: 0 sq mi (0.00 km^{2})
- Elevation: 876 ft (267 m)

Population (2020)
  - Total: 651
  - Density: 962.3/sq mi (371.54/km^{2})
- Time zone: UTC-5 (Eastern (EST))
  - Summer (DST): UTC-4 (EDT)
- ZIP code: 14544
- Area code: 585
- FIPS code: 36-64199
- GNIS feature ID: 0963107
- Website: www.villageofrushville.com

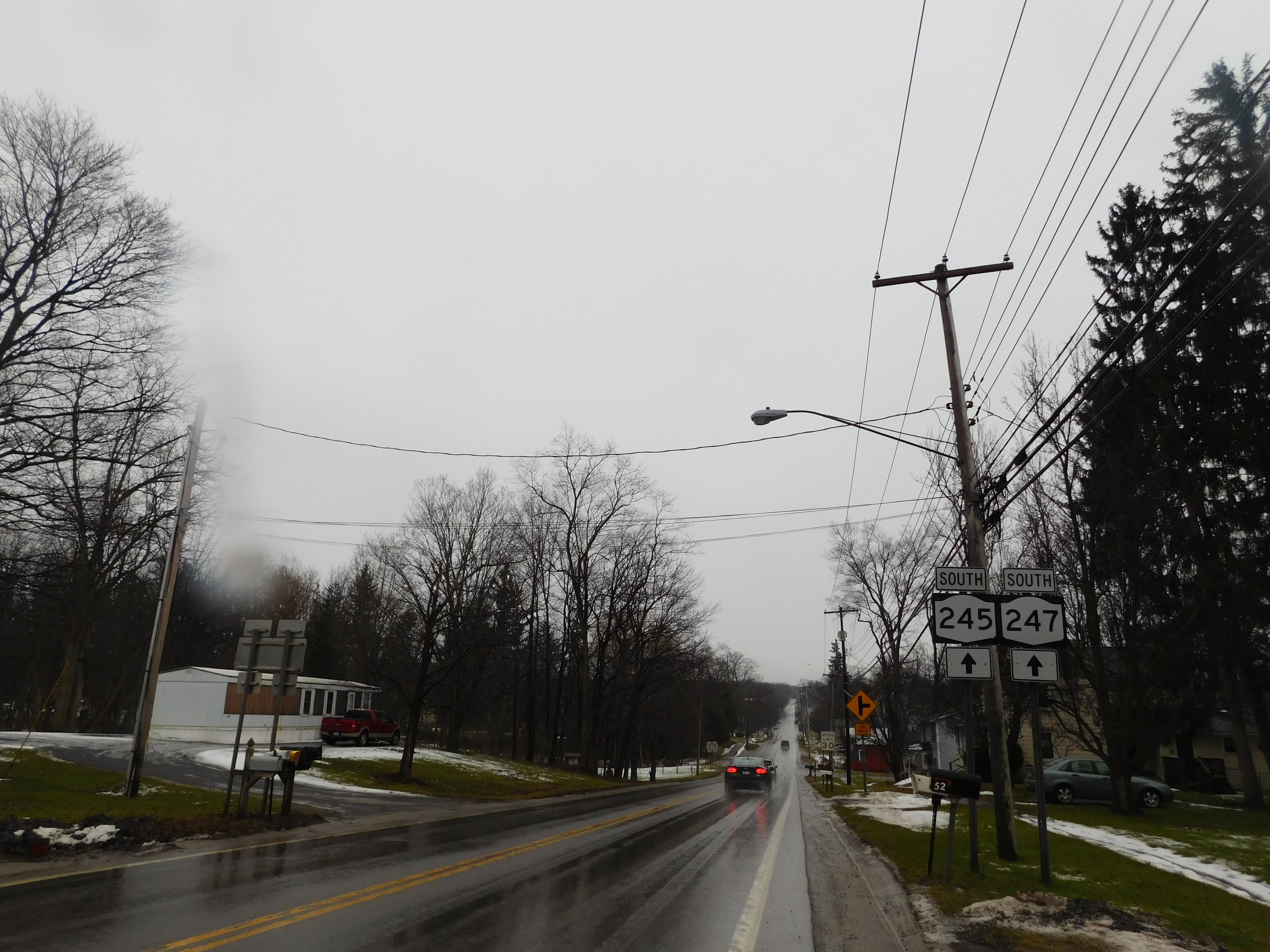
NY 245 and NY 247 south in Rushville

Rushville is a village situated in both Ontario and Yates Counties in the U.S. state of New York. As of the 2020 census, Rushville had a population of 651. The majority of the Village of Rushville lies within the Town of Potter in Yates County, while a smaller portion extends into the Town of Gorham in Ontario County. It is one of two villages in Ontario County that spans across two townships and the only village in the county divided between two counties.

== History ==
Rushville was initially known as Federal Hollow, a name derived from its early settlers affinity for the Federalist political party, and its location within one of Canandaigua Lake's many hollows, or valleys. Elias Gilbert became the first settler in the area, and established one of the first saw mills on the West River in 1800.

The community was renamed Rushville in 1819, upon the establishment of a Post Station. The new name was chosen in honor of Dr. Benjamin Rush, a hero of the American Revolution, at the suggestion of local doctor Ira Bryant. Chester Loomis was appointed to be the first postmaster.

The Milton Wilson House, a historic landmark, was listed on the National Register of Historic Places in 1994.

In 2017, the village residents voted against dissolution, with 179 votes against and 96 in favor.

== Notable people ==
- Ethel Isabel Moody (1905–1941), American mathematician
- Marcus Whitman, missionary who led the first wagon train on the Oregon Trail.

== Geography ==
Rushville is located at 42°45′40″N 77°13′34″W (42.761136, -77.226177).

According to the United States Census Bureau, the village has a total area of 0.6 square miles (1.7 km^{2}), all land.

Rushville is in the Finger Lakes District of New York and lies between Canandaigua Lake and Seneca Lake. The West River flows southwest through the village.

Marcus Whitman Middle/High School is located just outside Rushville.

New York State Route 245 and New York State Route 247, pass, partly conjoined, through the Village of Rushville.

== Demographics ==
Historical population
Census	Pop.	Note	%±
1880	503		—
1890	450		−10.5%
1900	416		−7.6%
1910	463		11.3%
1920	541		16.8%
1930	452		−16.5%
1940	428		−5.3%
1950	465		8.6%
1960	465		0.0%
1970	568		22.2%
1980	548		−3.5%
1990	609		11.1%
2000	621		2.0%
2010	677		9.0%
2020	651		−3.8%
U.S. Decennial Census

According to 2019 American Community Survey, there were 655 people, 237 households, and 155 families residing in the village. The population density was 1026 people per square mile. There were 313 housing units. The racial makeup of the village was 96.8% White, 1.1% African American, 0% Native American, 0% Asian, and 0.3% two or more races. Hispanic or Latino of any race were 1.8% of the population.

There were 237 households, out of which 30.4% had children under the age of 18 living with them. 60.3% were married couples living together, 15.3% had a female householder with no husband present, and 19.9% were non-families. 24.1% of all households were made up of individuals, and 48.5% of households had one or more people 60 years of age and over. The average household size was 2.7.

In the village, the population was spread out, with 22% under the age of 18, 12% from 20 to 29, 14% from 30 to 39, 10% from 40 to 49, 13% from 50 to 59, and 16% from 60 to 69. Overall, 17% of Rushville's population is 65 and older. The average age of a Rushville citizen is 39.7 years old.

The per capita income for a household in the village was $27,359, and the median income for a family was $43,047. Males had a median income of $30,833 versus $27,961 for females. About 6.1% of families and 10.1% of the population were below the poverty line. 33.4% of the village has a high school education, with another 34.8marcu % completing some college. 9.4% have completed a bachelor's degree.
