= Hall, New York =

Hall
- hamlet and CDP
- Location of Hall in New York
- Coordinates: 42°47′37.24″N 77°4′11.12″W
- Country: United States
- State: New York
- County: Ontario
- Elevation: 920 ft (280 m)

Population (2010)
  - Total: 216
- Time zone: UTC-5 (EST)
  - Summer (DST): UTC-4 (EST)
- ZIP code: 14463
- Area code: 585

Hall is a hamlet and census-designated place in Ontario County, New York, United States, located along State Route 14A in the Town of Seneca, near the city of Geneva and the Town of Geneva.

Located in the Finger Lakes region, Hall has a fire department and a post office with a downtown zip code of 14463, though the urbanized area extends beyond this. Hall also has various agricultural enterprises, including a tractor retailer, a seed production company (Seedway), and a fertilizer company (Hall Fertilizer Corp.). Seedway, a subsidiary of Growmark, serves the entire Northeast and is headquartered in Hall.

As of the 2010 census, Hall has a population of 216. With the exception of one Korean, the population was fully non-Hispanic white. Of the 97 housing units in the hamlet, 12 were vacant and the median household income was $74,861, reflective of its relatively robust economy. None of the population was below the poverty line.

Hall and the surrounding area were settled and cleared, mostly as farmland, around the turn of the 19th century, with a wave of migration from England. The hamlet, which was originally established as Hall's Corners, was informally known as "the English settlement." Starting in the mid-19th century, Hall had a station on a since removed section of line of the now defunct Elmira Rail Road Company, a subsidiary of the Northern Central Railroad. Despite this, Hall has retained its status as an active agricultural center.
