= Prattsburgh, New York =

- Town
- Location within New York Location within the United States
- Coordinates: 42°32′N 77°20′W
- Country: United States
- State: New York
- County: Steuben

Area
  - Total: 51.71 sq mi (133.94 km^{2})
  - Land: 51.67 sq mi (133.82 km^{2})
  - Water: 0.050 sq mi (0.13 km^{2})
- Elevation: 1,939 ft (591 m)

Population (2020)
  - Total: 1,985 ▼
  - Estimate (2021): 1,968
  - Density: 38.8/sq mi (14.97/km^{2})
- Time zone: UTC-5 (Eastern (EST))
  - Summer (DST): UTC-4 (EDT)
- ZIP code: 14873
- Area code: 607
- FIPS code: 36-59718
- GNIS feature ID: 0979395
- Website: www.townofprattsburgh.org

Prattsburgh is a town in Steuben County, New York, United States. The population was 1,985 at the 2020 census. It is situated in the northeast part of the county, north of Bath.

== History ==
Prattsburgh was formed from the town of Pulteney in 1813. The Prattsburgh community is named after early settler Joel Pratt, who arrived around 1799 to purchase land. Settlers arrived in 1801.

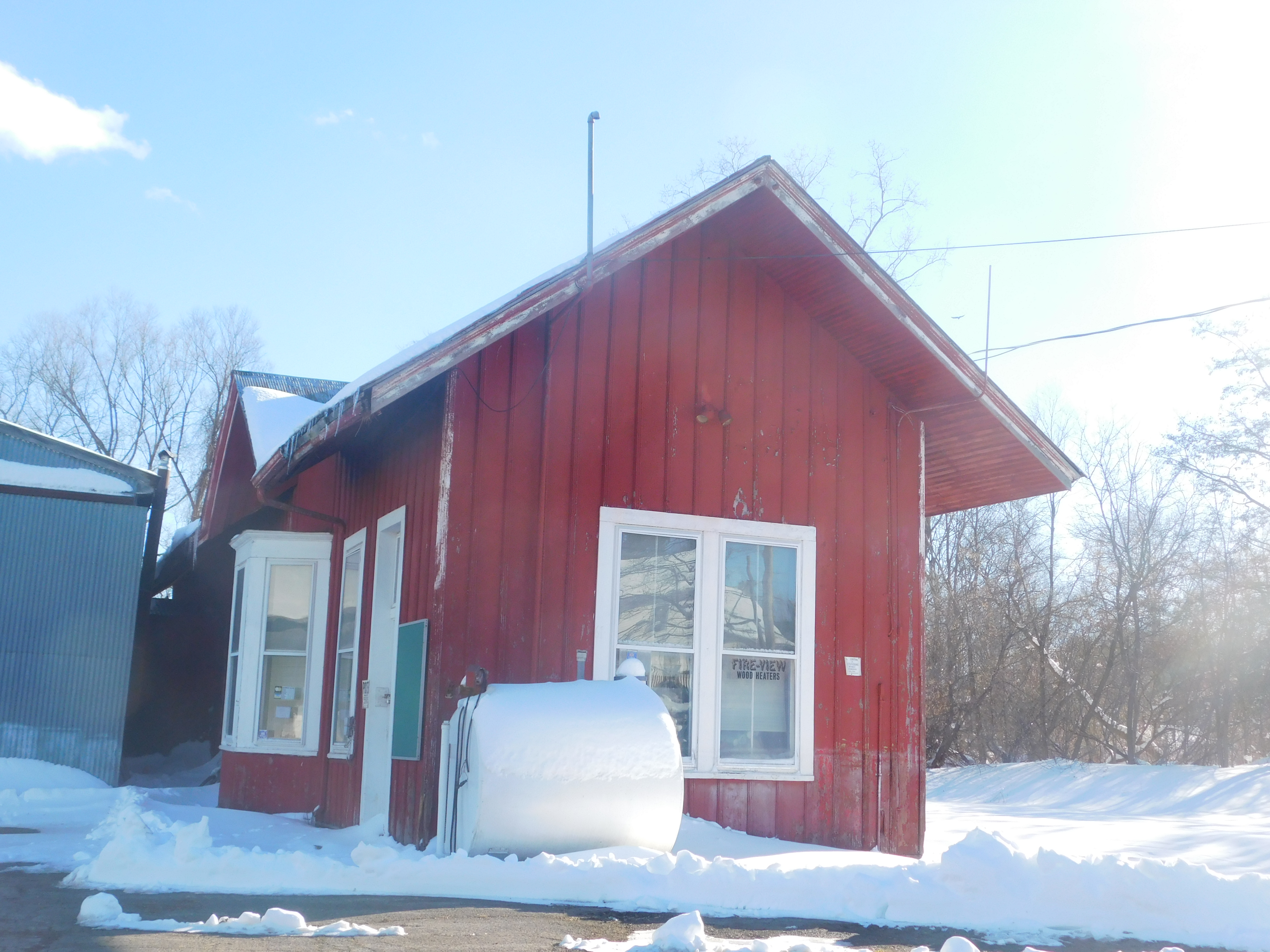
The former Kanona & Prattsburgh station in Prattsburgh

In Prattsburgh was the Franklin Institute, described as "old" about 1812.

From c. 1889-1961 Prattsburgh was located on a railroad. The Kanona & Prattsburgh Railroad Company, the Kanona & Prattsburgh Railway Company, and the Prattsburgh Railway Corporation during the period operated an 11.44 single-track standard-gauge railroad from a connection with the Erie Railroad at Kanona to Prattsburgh. Intermediate stations included Wheeler, Beans, and Stickneys.

== Geography ==
According to the United States Census Bureau, the town has a total area of 51.7 square miles (134 km^{2}), of which, 51.7 square miles (134 km^{2}) of it is land and 0.04 square miles (0.10 km^{2}) of it (0.06%) is water.

The north town line is the border of Steuben County and Yates County.

New York State Route 53 is an important north-south highway in the town.

The town is at a higher altitude than most other parts of the county.

== Demographics ==
Historical population
Census	Pop.	Note	%±
1820	1,377		—
1830	2,399		74.2%
1840	2,455		2.3%
1850	2,786		13.5%
1860	2,790		0.1%
1870	2,479		−11.1%
1880	2,349		−5.2%
1890	2,170		−7.6%
1900	2,197		1.2%
1910	1,834		−16.5%
1920	1,663		−9.3%
1930	1,421		−14.6%
1940	1,364		−4.0%
1950	1,353		−0.8%
1960	1,448		7.0%
1970	1,523		5.2%
1980	1,657		8.8%
1990	1,894		14.3%
2000	2,064		9.0%
2010	2,085		1.0%
2020	1,985		−4.8%
2021 (est.)	1,968	▼	−0.9%
U.S. Decennial Census

As of the census of 2000, there were 2,064 people, 809 households, and 567 families residing in the town. The population density was 39.9 inhabitants per square mile (15.4/km^{2}). There were 1,167 housing units at an average density of 22.6 per square mile (8.7/km^{2}). The racial makeup of the town was 96.17% White, 1.55% African American, 0.29% Native American, 0.10% Asian, 0.63% from other races, and 1.26% from two or more races. Hispanic or Latino of any race were 1.36% of the population.

There were 809 households, out of which 35.5% had children under the age of 18 living with them, 53.3% were married couples living together, 10.9% had a female householder with no husband present, and 29.9% were non-families. 24.2% of all households were made up of individuals, and 10.1% had someone living alone who was 65 years of age or older. The average household size was 2.55 and the average family size was 3.00.

In the town, the population was spread out, with 28.0% under the age of 18, 6.3% from 18 to 24, 27.9% from 25 to 44, 23.6% from 45 to 64, and 14.2% who were 65 years of age or older. The median age was 37 years. For every 100 females, there were 101.0 males. For every 100 females age 18 and over, there were 96.4 males.

The median income for a household in the town was $32,150, and the median income for a family was $36,250. Males had a median income of $28,421 versus $20,625 for females. The per capita income for the town was $15,008. About 12.9% of families and 17.5% of the population were below the poverty line, including 27.6% of those under age 18 and 5.9% of those age 65 or over.

== Communities and locations in the Town of Prattsburgh ==
- Beans Station – A location at the south town line on NY-53.
- Daball Corners – A location north of Prattsburgh hamlet on County Road 122.
- Ingleside – A hamlet in the northwest part of the town on NY-53.
- Prattsburgh – The hamlet of Prattsburgh is in the east-central part of the town on NY-53. Prattsburgh was incorporated as a village in 1848, but subsequently abandoned its village status in 1972. Its population was 656 in 2010.

== Famous people from Prattsburgh ==
- Robert B. Van Valkenburgh, former US congressman and army officer
- Narcissa Whitman (1808-1847), missionary in the American West. Together with Eliza Spalding became the 1st women to cross the continental divide.
