= Prattsburgh (CDP), New York =

Prattsburgh, New York
- Census-designated place
- Location within New York Location within the United States
- Coordinates: 42°31′20″N 77°17′20″W
- Country: United States
- State: New York
- County: Steuben
- Town: Prattsburgh

Area
  - Total: 1.64 sq mi (4.25 km^{2})
  - Land: 1.64 sq mi (4.25 km^{2})
  - Water: 0 sq mi (0.00 km^{2})
- Elevation: 1,481 ft (451 m)

Population (2020)
  - Total: 589
  - Density: 359.1/sq mi (138.63/km^{2})
- Time zone: UTC-5 (Eastern (EST))
  - Summer (DST): UTC-4 (EDT)
- ZIP Code: 14873
- Area code: 607
- FIPS code: 36-59708
- GNIS feature ID: 2631235

Prattsburgh is the primary hamlet and a census-designated place (CDP) in the town of Prattsburgh in Steuben County, New York, United States. As of the 2010 census, it had a population of 656, out of 2,085 in the entire town of Prattsburgh. The community was incorporated as a village in 1848 but was disincorporated in 1972.

The community is in northeastern Steuben County, in the east-central part of the town of Prattsburgh. It is on the west side of the valley of Fivemile Creek, a south-flowing tributary of the Cohocton River and part of the Susquehanna River watershed. New York State Route 53 runs through the center of the community, leading northwest 11 miles (18 km) to Naples and south-southwest 12 miles (19 km) to Interstate 86 at Kanona.

== Demographics ==
Historical population
Census	Pop.	Note	%±
2020	589		—
U.S. Decennial Census
