= Ontario County, New York =

County in New York, United States

- County
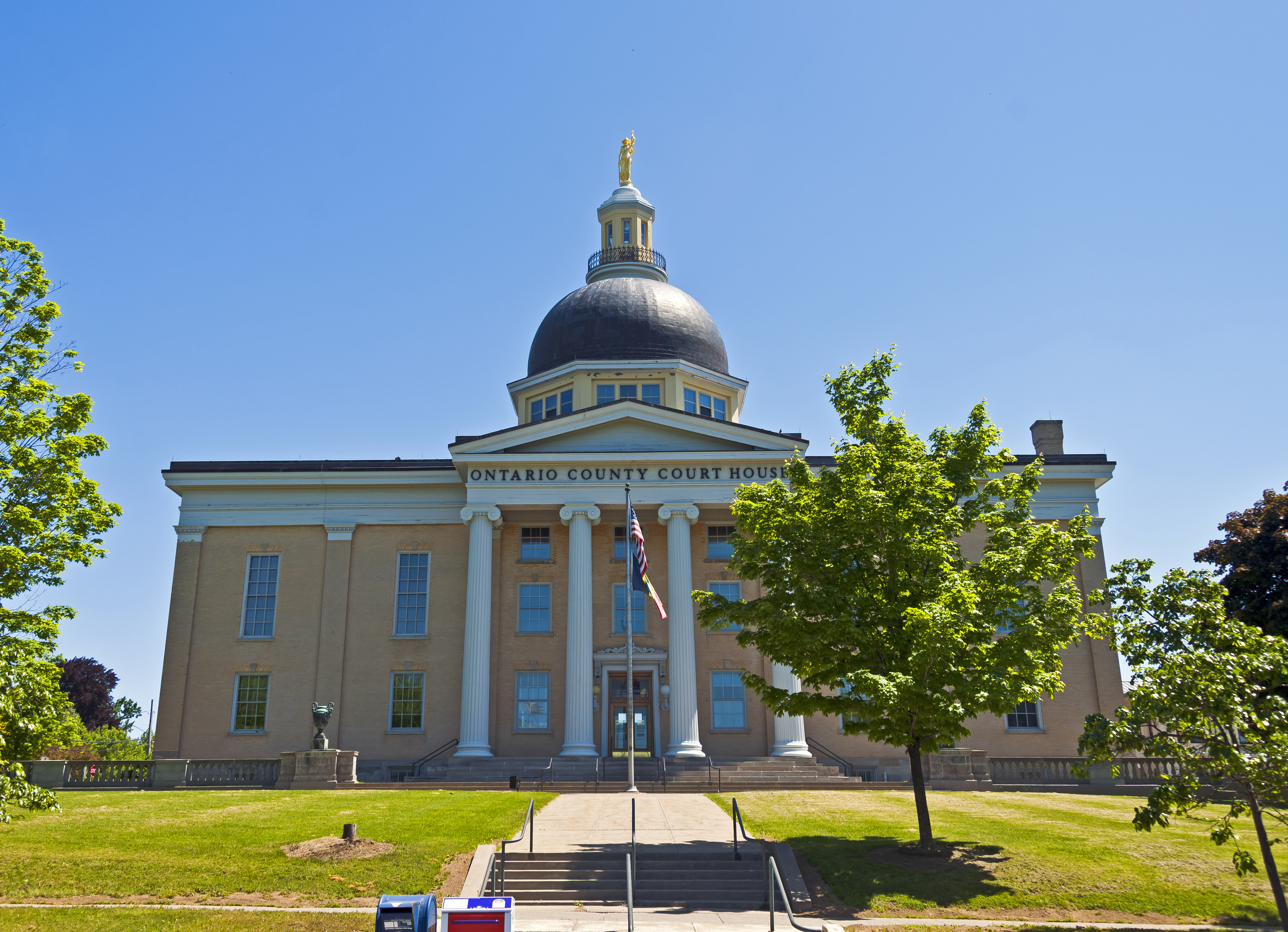
- Ontario County Courthouse in Canandaigua, 2014

- Flag Seal

- Location within the U.S. state of New York
- Coordinates: 42°51′N 77°17′W
- Country: United States
- State: New York
- Founded: 1789
- Named for: Lake Ontario
- Seat: Canandaigua
- Largest city: Geneva

Area
  - Total: 663 sq mi (1,720 km^{2})
  - Land: 644 sq mi (1,670 km^{2})
  - Water: 18 sq mi (47 km^{2}) 2.8%

Population (2020)
  - Total: 112,458
  - Estimate (2025): 113,130 ▲
  - Density: 169/sq mi (65/km^{2})
- Time zone: UTC−5 (Eastern)
  - Summer (DST): UTC−4 (EDT)
- Congressional districts: 24th, 25th
- Website: www.ontariocountyny.gov

Ontario County is a county in the U.S. state of New York. As of 2025, the population was 113,130. The county seat is Canandaigua. The county is part of the Finger Lakes region of the state.

Ontario County is part of the Rochester, New York metropolitan area.

== History ==
This area was long controlled by the Seneca people, one of the Five Nations of the Iroquois Confederacy, or Haudenosaunee. Evidence of their manufacture of beads to trade with the Dutch Republic has been observed at the Factory Hollow site in West Bloomfield.

They were forced to cede most of their land to the United States after the American Revolutionary War.

When the English established counties in New York Province in 1683, they designated Albany County as including all the northern part of New York State, the present State of Vermont, and, in theory, extending westward to the Pacific Ocean. On July 3, 1766 Cumberland County was organized, and on March 16, 1770 Gloucester County was founded, both containing territory now included in the state of Vermont. The English claims were their assertion; the Five and then Six Nations of the Iroquois occupied and controlled most of the territory in central and western New York until after the Revolutionary War.

As New York was more heavily settled in the 18th century, the colonial government organized additional counties, but European settlement did not proceed very far west past Little Falls, New York, about halfway through the Mohawk Valley, until after the revolutionary war. This area was ostensibly part of Montgomery County, renamed after the war for an American officer. Seth Read, a Colonel in the Battle of Bunker Hill, moved here with his family as a pioneer between 1787 and 1795. See also Geneva (town), New York.

Land-hungry settlers from New England swept into upstate and western New York after the Revolution, as nearly five million acres of new lands were available for purchase since the Iroquois were forced to cede most of their territories to the United States. Four tribes had allied with the British and were mostly resettled in Canada: the Mohawk, Onondaga, Seneca and Cayuga.

Transfer of what is now Ontario County to New York formally took effect in 1789, when native title was extinguished, and the county was formally established to govern the lands of the Phelps and Gorham Purchase the year prior. The territory first organized as Ontario County was much larger than at present and ran south from the shore of Lake Ontario. As the area was settled, new counties were organized. The following counties were rapidly organized from this territory in the first decades after the war: Allegany, Cattaraugus, Chautauqua, Erie, Genesee, Livingston, Monroe, Niagara, Orleans, Steuben, Wyoming, and Yates counties, and parts of Schuyler and Wayne counties.

In 1796, Ontario County was divided and Steuben County was organized. In 1802, Ontario County was reduced when Genesee County was split off. The new county was originally very large, including the present Allegany, Cattaraugus, Chautauqua, Erie, Niagara, Orleans and Wyoming Counties and parts of Livingston and Monroe counties.

In 1821, portions of Genesee County were combined with portions of Ontario County to create Livingston and Monroe counties.

In 1823, a portion of Seneca County was combined with a portion of Ontario County to create Wayne County. The same year, a portion of Steuben County was combined with a portion of Ontario County to create Yates County.

== Great Awakening ==
This frontier area was part of the evangelistic activities during the Second Great Awakening of the early 19th century, when Baptist, Methodist and Congregational preachers traveled and organized revivals and camp meetings. In addition, independent sects developed in central and western New York during this period, including the Church of Jesus Christ of Latter Day Saints, the Shakers and the Universal Friends.

=== Latter Day Saint movement ===
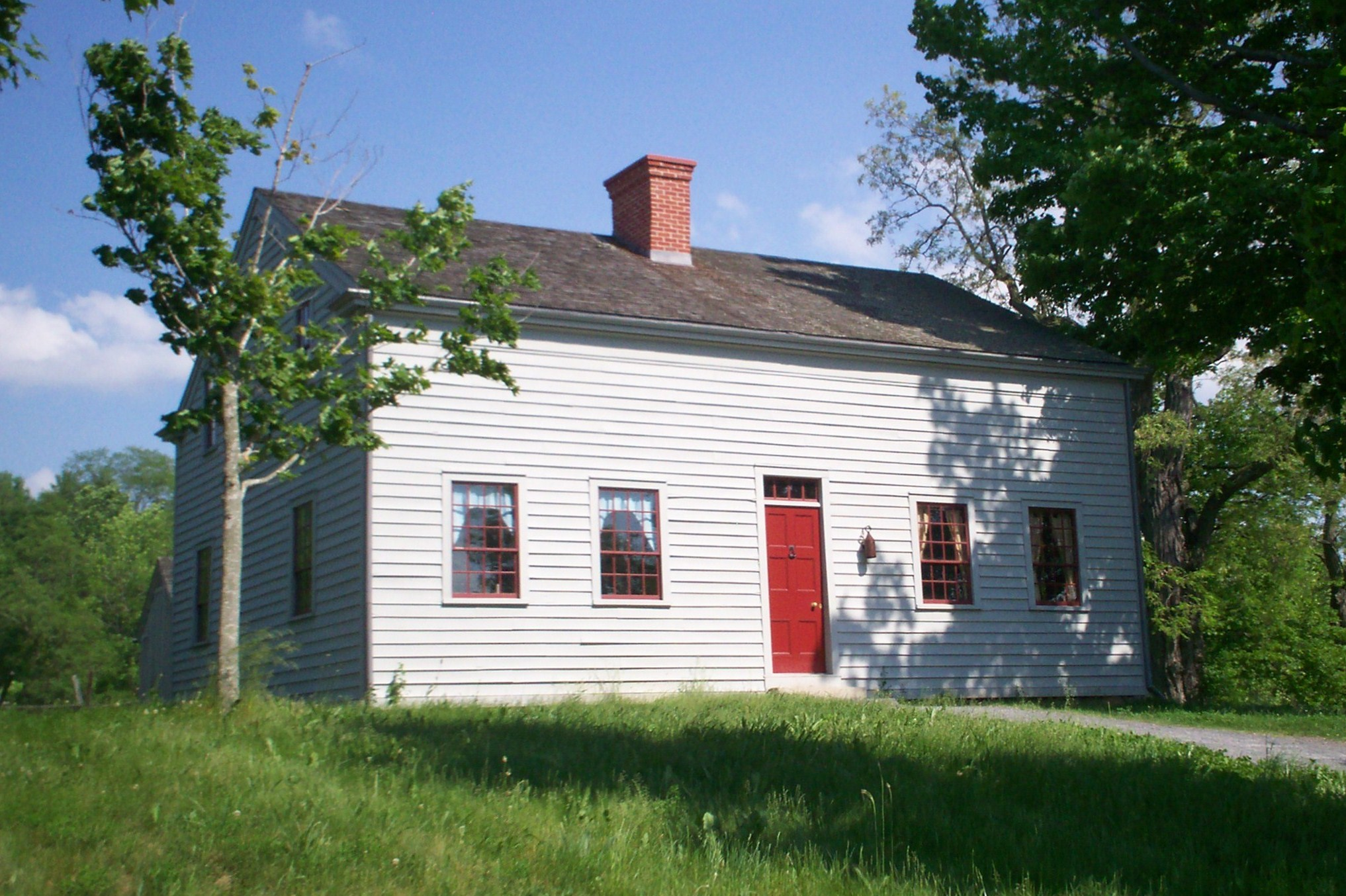
Home of the Joseph Smith, Sr. family in Manchester, known as the "frame home".

Joseph Smith, founder of the Latter Day Saint movement, lived in Manchester in the 1820s on the border with Palmyra. Several events in the early history of the movement occurred in Ontario County. Hill Cumorah in Manchester is where Smith said he discovered the Golden plates said to contain the writings later known as the Book of Mormon. Smith visited the hill each year on the fall equinox (September 22) between 1823 and 1827, and claimed to be instructed by the Angel Moroni. Smith said he was finally permitted to take the record on September 22, 1827. He published the Book of Mormon in Palmyra in 1830. The 110-foot (34 m) hill (which was then unnamed) is on the main road toward Canandaigua from Palmyra to Manchester (modern State Route 21); it was a few miles from Joseph Smith's home.

Since the 1930s the Church of Jesus Christ of Latter-day Saints has held the Hill Cumorah Pageant annually here. It regularly attracts thousands to its performances. The church also maintains a visitors' center at the hill, the Palmyra New York Temple, and the former Smith property and homes. The latter property straddles the border between Ontario and Wayne counties.

== Geography ==
According to the U.S. Census Bureau, the county has a total area of 663 square miles (1,720 km^{2}), of which 644 square miles (1,670 km^{2}) is land and 18 square miles (47 km^{2}) (2.8%) is water.

Ontario County is in western New York State, east of Buffalo, southeast of Rochester, and northwest of Ithaca. The county is within the Finger Lakes Region of the state.

=== Adjacent counties ===
- Wayne County - north
- Seneca County - east
- Yates County - south
- Steuben County - southwest
- Livingston County - west
- Monroe County - northwest

=== Major highways ===
- Interstate 90 (New York State Thruway)
- Interstate 490
- U.S. Route 20
- U.S. Route 20A
- New York State Route 5
- New York State Route 14
- New York State Route 14A
- New York State Route 15A
- New York State Route 21
- New York State Route 31
- New York State Route 53
- New York State Route 64
- New York State Route 65
- New York State Route 88
- New York State Route 96
- New York State Route 245
- New York State Route 247
- New York State Route 251
- New York State Route 318
- New York State Route 332
- New York State Route 364
- New York State Route 444
- New York State Route 488

== Government and politics ==
United States presidential election results for Ontario County, New York
Year	Republican		Democratic		Third party(ies)	
Year	No.	%	No.	%	No.	%
1884	6,382	51.53%	5,643	45.56%	361	2.91%
1888	6,957	53.15%	5,753	43.95%	379	2.90%
1892	6,319	50.10%	5,376	42.62%	919	7.29%
1896	7,506	56.30%	5,485	41.14%	341	2.56%
1900	7,707	56.46%	5,641	41.33%	302	2.21%
1904	8,184	59.36%	5,283	38.32%	321	2.33%
1908	8,245	58.73%	5,484	39.06%	311	2.22%
1912	4,897	39.88%	4,734	38.55%	2,648	21.57%
1916	7,491	56.82%	5,286	40.10%	406	3.08%
1920	13,361	66.20%	5,678	28.13%	1,145	5.67%
1924	15,013	66.66%	5,933	26.34%	1,577	7.00%
1928	17,769	65.27%	8,491	31.19%	965	3.54%
1932	15,624	61.71%	9,273	36.62%	423	1.67%
1936	17,812	65.45%	8,787	32.29%	616	2.26%
1940	18,932	67.23%	9,110	32.35%	120	0.43%
1944	16,859	63.95%	9,437	35.80%	68	0.26%
1948	16,156	63.51%	8,852	34.80%	431	1.69%
1952	21,659	71.15%	8,763	28.79%	18	0.06%
1956	22,317	74.30%	7,719	25.70%	0	0.00%
1960	19,654	61.55%	12,251	38.37%	26	0.08%
1964	10,847	35.24%	19,922	64.72%	15	0.05%
1968	17,114	56.86%	11,719	38.94%	1,265	4.20%
1972	23,828	68.23%	11,012	31.53%	81	0.23%
1976	21,118	59.59%	14,044	39.63%	279	0.79%
1980	17,036	47.98%	14,477	40.77%	3,993	11.25%
1984	24,507	65.36%	12,844	34.26%	143	0.38%
1988	21,780	55.23%	17,341	43.97%	314	0.80%
1992	18,995	42.32%	16,064	35.79%	9,830	21.90%
1996	17,237	41.60%	19,156	46.23%	5,046	12.18%
2000	23,885	51.98%	19,761	43.01%	2,303	5.01%
2004	27,999	55.88%	21,166	42.24%	945	1.89%
2008	25,171	49.34%	25,103	49.20%	746	1.46%
2012	23,820	49.78%	23,087	48.25%	946	1.98%
2016	26,029	49.55%	22,233	42.33%	4,265	8.12%
2020	28,782	48.54%	28,749	48.48%	1,769	2.98%
2024	30,221	50.07%	29,520	48.91%	611	1.01%

The county is governed by an elected Board of Supervisors, and uses the Board-Administrator system, hiring a professional County Administrator. The Board of Supervisors has twenty-one members: one is elected from each Town, two from the city of Canandaigua and three from the city of Geneva. As of 2004, the county government has over 800 full-time employees (augmented by another 360 seasonal or available part-time workers), and a budget of $136 million.

The county is similar in its politics to much of the rest of rural upstate New York; its voters have tended to support Republican presidential candidates ever since that party was formed, and before that they supported the Whig Party.

However, beginning in the 1990s, the Democratic Party began to improve its performance in Ontario County thanks to the growth of Rochester's outer suburbs in areas such as Victor and Farmington. In 1996, Ontario County voted for the Democratic presidential candidate for the first time since 1964 and only the second time since the Whig Party contested its first presidential election in 1836. In 2008, John McCain narrowly edged a victory over Barack Obama by less than one percent, and in 2012 Obama narrowly lost the county to Republican nominee Mitt Romney by a margin of 1.5 percent. In 2016, Republican nominee Donald Trump of New York City won the county by 7.3 percent over Democratic nominee and former United States Secretary of State / former Senator from New York Hillary Clinton of Chappaqua, New York. In 2020, Democrat Joe Biden came incredibly close to winning the county, losing to Trump by just 33 votes. In 2024, Trump received just over 50% of the vote, the first time a presidential candidate gained a majority instead of a plurality in the county since 2004.

=== State and federal government ===
Office	District	Area of the county	Officeholder	Party	First took office	Residence
U.S. Representative	New York's 24th congressional district	All	Claudia Tenney	Republican	2020	Canandaigua
State Senator	54th State Senate District	Roughly, the northeast corner of the county (Towns of Canandaigua, Farmington, Geneva, Gorham, Hopewell, Manchester, Phelps, Seneca)	Pam Helming	Republican	2017	Canandaigua, Ontario County
State Senator	55th State Senate District	All of the county not covered by the 54th district (Towns of Bristol, Canadice, East Bloomfield, Naples, Richmond, South Bristol, Victor, West Bloomfield)	Rich Funke	Republican	2015	Fairport, Monroe County
State Assemblyman	131st State Assembly District	All	Jeff L. Gallahan	Republican	2021	Ontario County

Ontario County is part of:

- The 7th Judicial District of the New York Supreme Court
- The 4th Department of the New York Supreme Court, Appellate Division

== Economy ==
According to the 2022 Census of Agriculture, Ontario County ranked fourth in New York for acres of berries grown. Farmers in the county reported berries grown on 220 acres that year.

== Demographics ==
Historical population
Census	Pop.	Note	%±
1790	1,075		—
1800	15,218		1,315.6%
1810	42,032		176.2%
1820	88,267		110.0%
1830	40,288		−54.4%
1840	43,501		8.0%
1850	43,929		1.0%
1860	44,563		1.4%
1870	45,108		1.2%
1880	49,541		9.8%
1890	48,453		−2.2%
1900	49,605		2.4%
1910	52,286		5.4%
1920	52,652		0.7%
1930	54,276		3.1%
1940	55,307		1.9%
1950	60,172		8.8%
1960	68,070		13.1%
1970	78,849		15.8%
1980	88,909		12.8%
1990	95,101		7.0%
2000	100,224		5.4%
2010	107,931		7.7%
2020	112,458		4.2%
2025 (est.)	113,130	▲	0.6%
U.S. Decennial Census; 1790-1960 1900-1990; 1990-2000 2010-2020

=== 2020 census ===
Ontario County, New York – Racial and ethnic composition Note: the US Census treats Hispanic/Latino as an ethnic category. This table excludes Latinos from the racial categories and assigns them to a separate category. Hispanics/Latinos may be of any race.
Race / Ethnicity (NH = Non-Hispanic)	Pop 1980	Pop 1990	Pop 2000	Pop 2010	Pop 2020	% 1980	% 1990	% 2000	% 2010	% 2020
White alone (NH)	86,051	91,496	94,179	99,119	97,397	96.79%	96.21%	93.97%	91.84%	86.61%
Black or African American alone (NH)	1,420	1,596	1,904	2,226	2,439	1.60%	1.68%	1.90%	2.06%	2.17%
Native American or Alaska Native alone (NH)	141	216	185	244	197	0.16%	0.23%	0.18%	0.23%	0.18%
Asian alone (NH)	193	491	675	1,111	1,374	0.22%	0.52%	0.67%	1.03%	1.22%
Native Hawaiian or Pacific Islander alone (NH)	x	x	17	16	23	x	x	0.02%	0.01%	0.02%
Other race alone (NH)	146	36	87	66	418	0.16%	0.04%	0.09%	0.06%	0.37%
Mixed race or Multiracial (NH)	x	x	1,028	1,470	4,497	x	x	1.03%	1.36%	4.00%
Hispanic or Latino (any race)	958	1,266	2,149	3,679	6,113	1.08%	1.33%	2.14%	3.41%	5.44%
Total	88,909	95,101	100,224	107,931	112,458	100.00%	100.00%	100.00%	100.00%	100.00%

=== 2000 census ===
As of the census of 2000, there were 100,224 people, 38,370 households, and 26,360 families residing in the county. The population density was 156 inhabitants per square mile (60/km^{2}). There were 42,647 housing units at an average density of 66 units per square mile (25/km^{2}). According to respondents' self-identification, the racial makeup of the county was 95.04% White, 2.06% African American, 0.22% Native American, 0.69% Asian, 0.02% Pacific Islander, 0.70% from other races, and 1.26% from two or more races. Hispanic or Latino of any race were 2.14% of the population. Based on self-identification, 17.9% were of German, 14.9% Irish, 14.8% English, 13.8% Italian, 7.3% American and 5.1% Dutch ancestry according to Census 2000. 95.6% spoke English and 2.3% Spanish as their first language.

There were 38,370 households, out of which 32.80% had children under the age of 18 living with them, 55.00% were married couples living together, 9.90% had a female householder with no husband present, and 31.30% were non-families. 24.70% of all households were made up of individuals, and 10.10% had someone living alone who was 65 years of age or older. The average household size was 2.53 and the average family size was 3.03.

In the county, the population was spread out, with 25.40% under the age of 18, 8.30% from 18 to 24, 28.40% from 25 to 44, 24.80% from 45 to 64, and 13.20% who were 65 years of age or older. The median age was 38 years. For every 100 females there were 95.60 males. For every 100 females age 18 and over, there were 92.70 males.

The median income for a household in the county was $44,579, and the median income for a family was $52,698. Males had a median income of $36,732 versus $26,139 for females. The per capita income for the county was $21,533. About 4.90% of families and 7.30% of the population were below the poverty line, including 9.10% of those under age 18 and 6.40% of those age 65 or over.

== Communities ==
=== Larger settlements ===
#	Location	Population	Type	Sector
1	‡Geneva	13,261	City	East
2	†Canandaigua	10,545	City	West
3	Victor	2,696	Village	West
4	Clifton Springs	2,127	Village	East
5	Phelps	1,989	Village	East
6	Manchester	1,709	Village	East
7	Shortsville	1,439	Village	East
8	Bloomfield	1,361	Village	West
9	Naples	1,041	Village	South
10	‡Rushville	655	Village	East
11	Crystal Beach	644	CDP	East
12	Gorham	604	CDP	East
13	Honeoye	579	CDP	South
14	Port Gibson	453	CDP	East
15	Hall	216	CDP	East

† - County Seat

‡ - Not Wholly in this County

=== Towns ===
- Bristol
- Canadice
- Canandaigua
- East Bloomfield
- Farmington
- Geneva
- Gorham
- Hopewell
- Manchester
- Naples
- Phelps
- Richmond
- Seneca
- South Bristol
- Victor
- West Bloomfield

=== Hamlets ===
- Border City
- Centerfield
- Cheshire
- Fishers
- Hall
- Hopewell Center
- Ionia
- Orleans
- Seneca Castle
- Stanley

== Education ==
School districts include:

- Canandaigua City School District
- East Bloomfield Central School District
- Geneva City School District
- Gorham-Middlesex Central School District (Marcus Whitman)
- Honeoye Central School District
- Honeoye Falls-Lima Central School District
- Livonia Central School District
- Lyons Central School District
- Manchester-Shortsville Central School District
- Naples Central School District
- Newark Central School District
- Palmyra-Macedon Central School District
- Penn Yan Central School District
- Phelps-Clifton Springs Central School District
- Pittsford Central School District
- Victor Central School District
- Wayland-Cohocton Central School District

== See also ==
- List of counties in New York
- National Register of Historic Places listings in Ontario County, New York
