= National Register of Historic Places listings in Yates County, New York =

Location of Yates County in New York

List of the National Register of Historic Places listings in Yates County, New York

This is intended to be a complete list of properties and districts listed on the National Register of Historic Places in Yates County, New York. The locations of National Register properties and districts (at least for all showing latitude and longitude coordinates below) may be seen in a map by clicking on "Map of all coordinates".

This National Park Service list is complete through NPS recent listings posted November 6, 2026.

Contents: Counties in New York
Albany (Albany) – Allegany – Bronx – Broome – Cattaraugus – Cayuga – Chautauqua – Chemung – Chenango – Clinton – Columbia – Cortland – Delaware – Dutchess (Poughkeepsie, Rhinebeck) – Erie (Buffalo) – Essex – Franklin – Fulton – Genesee – Greene – Hamilton – Herkimer – Jefferson – Kings – Lewis – Livingston – Madison – Monroe (Rochester) – Montgomery – Nassau – New York (Below 14th Street, 14th to 59th Streets, 59th to 110th Streets, Above 110th Street, Islands) – Niagara (Niagara Falls) – Oneida – Onondaga (Syracuse) – Ontario – Orange – Orleans – Oswego – Otsego – Putnam – Queens – Rensselaer – Richmond – Rockland – St. Lawrence – Saratoga – Schenectady – Schoharie – Schuyler – Seneca – Steuben – Suffolk – Sullivan – Tioga – Tompkins – Ulster – Warren – Washington – Wayne – Westchester (Northern, Southern, New Rochelle, Peekskill, Yonkers) – Wyoming – Yates

== Listings county-wide ==
	Name on the Register	Image	Date listed	Location	City or town	Description
1	Angus Cobblestone Farmhouse and Barn Complex		May 11, 1992 (#92000439)	612 NY 14; 42°44′03″N 76°58′29″W	Benton	
2	Jonathan Bailey House		August 24, 1994 (#94000926)	Bath Rd. 42°35′22″N 77°03′34″W	Milo	
3	Barden Cobblestone Farmhouse	Barden Cobblestone Farmhouse	May 11, 1992 (#92000435)	2492 Ferguson Corners Rd. 42°45′16″N 77°04′26″W	Benton	
4	Bates Cobblestone Farmhouse	Bates Cobblestone Farmhouse	May 11, 1992 (#92000436)	5521 NY 364; 42°45′34″N 77°16′25″W	Middlesex	
5	Beddoe–Rose Family Cemetery		November 19, 2014 (#14000939)	E. of W. Bluff Dr., Keuka Lake State Park; 42°34′57″N 77°07′55″W	Jerusalem	Grave sites of family involved in early settlement of area
6	Peter Bitley House		August 24, 1994 (#94000927)	W. Lake Rd. (NY Rt. 54A); 42°35′32″N 77°09′11″W	Jerusalem	
7	Thomas Bitley House		August 24, 1994 (#94000928)	Lake St. 42°35′33″N 77°09′10″W	Jerusalem	
8	Samuel Botsford House		August 24, 1994 (#94000929)	County House Rd. 42°37′46″N 77°09′41″W	Jerusalem	
9	John Briggs House		August 24, 1994 (#94000930)	2646 Himrod Rd. 42°38′07″N 77°00′01″W	Milo Center	
10	John Carr House		August 24, 1994 (#94000931)	NY 245; 42°41′46″N 77°16′40″W	Middlesex	
11	Crooked Lake Outlet Historic District	Crooked Lake Outlet Historic District	January 19, 1996 (#95001545)	Along the Keuka Lake Outlet Trail, from Penn Yan to Dresden; 42°40′37″N 76°57′49″W	Penn Yan	
12	Thomas Bennett Curtis House		August 24, 1994 (#94000932)	Shannon Corners Rd. 42°33′00″N 76°55′53″W	Starkey	
13	Dundee Methodist Church	Dundee Methodist Church	January 5, 2005 (#04001445)	33 Water St. 42°31′35″N 76°58′36″W	Dundee	
14	Dundee Village Historic District	Dundee Village Historic District	April 10, 2007 (#07000329)	Main, Water, and Seneca Sts. 42°31′24″N 76°58′37″W	Dundee	
15	Jephtha Earl Cobblestone Farmhouse	Jephtha Earl Cobblestone Farmhouse	May 11, 1992 (#92000438)	Old State Rd. N of jct. with Johnson Rd. 42°45′27″N 76°58′42″W	Benton	
16	Esperanza	Esperanza	December 7, 1995 (#95001406)	NY 54A E of Keuka Lake; 42°35′45″N 77°08′06″W	Jerusalem	
17	First Presbyterian Church	First Presbyterian Church	September 24, 2004 (#04001058)	31 Main St. 42°31′28″N 76°58′37″W	Dundee	
18	James Fox House	James Fox House	August 24, 1994 (#94000934)	750 Italy Valley Rd. 42°36′22″N 77°17′54″W	Italy	
19	Garrett Memorial Chapel	Garrett Memorial Chapel	March 30, 2001 (#01000296)	Skyline Dr. 42°30′27″N 77°07′54″W	Jerusalem	Norman Gothic chapel with scenic views of Keuka Lake
20	Asahel Green Farm		August 24, 1994 (#94000935)	S. Vine Valley Rd. 42°43′40″N 77°18′00″W	Middlesex	
21	Uriah Hair House		August 24, 1994 (#94000936)	Water St. (Dundee-Himrod Rd.); 42°31′52″N 76°58′32″W	Dundee	
22	Hampstead		August 24, 1994 (#94000937)	3170 NY Rt. 54A; 42°36′14″N 77°06′48″W	Jerusalem	
23	Uriah Hanford House		August 24, 1994 (#94000938)	W. Lake Rd. 42°39′12″N 77°04′35″W	Jerusalem	
24	George Hays House		August 24, 1994 (#94000939)	County House Rd. 42°40′01″N 77°04′26″W	Jerusalem	
25	Himrod Baptist Church		August 24, 1994 (#94000940)	Himrod Rd. 42°35′22″N 76°57′17″W	Milo	
26	James Hobart House		August 24, 1994 (#94000941)	4646 Italy Valley Rd. 42°41′39″N 77°12′47″W	Potter	
27	Robert Ingersoll Birthplace	Robert Ingersoll Birthplace	February 11, 1988 (#88000110)	Main St. 42°41′02″N 76°57′23″W	Dresden	
28	Italy Valley Methodist Church	Italy Valley Methodist Church	August 24, 1994 (#94000942)	Italy Valley Rd. 42°36′39″N 77°17′32″W	Italy	
29	Lake View Cemetery	Lake View Cemetery	February 23, 1996 (#96000137)	W. Lake Rd. 42°39′41″N 77°03′51″W	Penn Yan	
30	Larzelere Tavern		December 19, 1997 (#97001525)	3858 County House Rd. 42°37′36″N 77°09′45″W	Branchport	
31	Smith McLoud House	Smith McLoud House	August 22, 1994 (#94000944)	Italy Tpk. 42°36′06″N 77°15′51″W	Italy	
32	Middlesex Center Methodist Church		August 24, 1994 (#94000945)	Main St. 42°42′26″N 77°16′12″W	Middlesex	
33	Roderick M. Morrison House	Roderick M. Morrison House	August 24, 1994 (#94000946)	105 Highland Dr. 42°39′52″N 77°03′49″W	Penn Yan	
34	William Nichols Cobblestone Farmhouse	William Nichols Cobblestone Farmhouse	May 11, 1992 (#92000437)	Alexander Rd. W of jct. with Thistle St. Rd. 42°45′33″N 77°02′21″W	Benton	
35	John Noyes House		August 24, 1994 (#94000947)	Lakemont-Himrod Rd. 42°31′19″N 76°55′33″W	Starkey	
36	Overackers Corners Schoolhouse	Overackers Corners Schoolhouse	August 24, 1994 (#94000948)	Vine Valley Rd. 42°44′21″N 77°16′49″W	Middlesex	
37	Penn Yan Historic District	Penn Yan Historic District	March 14, 1985 (#85000591)	Roughly bounded by Water, Seneca, Elm, Wagener, Court, Clinton, North and Main Sts. 42°39′49″N 77°03′08″W	Penn Yan	
38	Ezikial Perry House		August 24, 1994 (#94000949)	287 Sherman Hollow Rd. 42°40′01″N 77°05′57″W	Jerusalem	
39	Arnold Potter House		August 24, 1994 (#94000950)	1445 Voak Rd. 42°41′22″N 77°07′44″W	Potter	
40	Miles Raplee House		August 24, 1994 (#94000951)	Randall Rd. 42°37′03″N 76°55′25″W	Milo	
41	Sampson Theatre	Sampson Theatre	November 7, 2008 (#08001035)	130-136 E. Elm St. 42°39′41″N 77°03′08″W	Penn Yan	New listing; refnum# 08001035
42	Sill Tenant House		August 24, 1994 (#94000952)	3232 Co. Rt. 54; 42°36′08″N 77°07′18″W	Jerusalem	
43	Dr. Henry Spence Cobblestone Farmhouse and Barn Complex	Dr. Henry Spence Cobblestone Farmhouse and Barn Complex	May 11, 1992 (#92000441)	Lakemont-Himrod Rd. N of jct. with Shannon Corners Rd. 42°33′21″N 76°56′48″W	Starkey	
44	Spicer-Millard House		August 24, 1994 (#94000953)	Crystal Springs Rd. (NY 230); 42°30′03″N 77°02′43″W	Barrington	
45	St. Luke's Episcopal Church		August 24, 1994 (#94000954)	W. Lake Rd. (Co. Rt. 54A); 42°35′48″N 77°09′11″W	Jerusalem	
46	Starkey United Methodist Church		August 24, 1994 (#94000955)	Lakemont-Himrod Rd. 42°32′11″N 76°56′04″W	Starkey	
47	Daniel Supplee Cobblestone Farmhouse		May 11, 1992 (#92000442)	4420 Dundee-Himrod Rd. 42°33′04″N 76°58′22″W	Starkey	
48	William Swarthout Farm		August 24, 1994 (#94000956)	Bath Rd. 42°38′03″N 77°03′35″W	Milo	
49	William Swortz House		August 24, 1994 (#94000957)	Dundee-Himrod Rd. 42°32′53″N 76°58′24″W	Starkey	
50	US Post Office-Penn Yan	US Post Office-Penn Yan	May 11, 1989 (#88002403)	159 Main St. 42°39′44″N 77°03′16″W	Penn Yan	
51	Vine Valley Methodist Church		August 24, 1994 (#94000958)	Robeson Rd. 42°43′26″N 77°19′29″W	Middlesex	
52	Abraham Wagener House	Abraham Wagener House	August 24, 1994 (#94000959)	Skyline Rd. 42°30′36″N 77°08′15″W	Jerusalem	
53	Charles Wagener House	Charles Wagener House	August 24, 1994 (#94000960)	351 Elm St. 42°39′39″N 77°03′46″W	Penn Yan	
54	H. Allen Wagener House		August 24, 1994 (#94000961)	367 W. Lake Rd. 42°37′35″N 77°05′33″W	Jerusalem	
55	Myron Weaver House		August 24, 1994 (#94000962)	21 S. Main St. 42°35′39″N 77°09′17″W	Branchport	
56	Solomon Weaver House		August 24, 1994 (#94000963)	7 S. Main St. 42°35′53″N 77°09′22″W	Branchport	
57	Whitaker House		August 24, 1994 (#94000964)	Benton-Torrey Town Line Rd. 42°42′16″N 77°01′03″W	Benton	
58	Jemima Wilkinson House (Friend's Home)	Jemima Wilkinson House (Friend's Home)	August 24, 1994 (#94000965)	3912 Friend Hill Rd. 42°39′12″N 77°09′54″W	Jerusalem	
59	Sherman Williams House and Fruit Barn		August 24, 1994 (#94000966)	Co. Rt. 54A; 42°37′22″N 77°05′48″W	Jerusalem	
60	Christopher Willis House	Christopher Willis House	August 24, 1994 (#94000967)	57 Seneca St. 42°41′05″N 76°57′03″W	Dresden	
61	Milton Wilson House		August 24, 1994 (#94000968)	28 Gilbert St. 42°45′37″N 77°13′47″W	Rushville	
62	Abner Woodworth House		August 24, 1994 (#94000969)	Flat St. 42°41′30″N 77°03′14″W	Benton	
63	Dr. James Wrightman House		August 24, 1994 (#94000970)	48 W. Lake Rd. 42°35′28″N 77°09′04″W	Branchport	
64	Yates County Courthouse Park District	Yates County Courthouse Park District	June 19, 1979 (#79001652)	Main, Court and Liberty Sts. 42°39′54″N 77°03′28″W	Penn Yan	
65	Yatesville Methodist Church		August 25, 1994 (#94000971)	Yatesville Rd. 42°40′18″N 77°08′16″W	Potter	
66	Young-Leach Cobblestone Farmhouse and Barn Complex		May 11, 1992 (#92000440)	2601 NY 14; 42°38′16″N 76°56′21″W	Torrey	

== See also ==
- National Register of Historic Places listings in New York
