= Weaver House =

Weaver House may refer to:

in the United States (by state);

- Lee Weaver House, Hardy, AR, listed on the NRHP in Arkansas
- Henry Weaver House, Santa Monica, CA, listed on the NRHP in California
- James B. Weaver House, Bloomfield, IA, listed on the NRHP in Iowa
- Weaver-Fox House, Uniontown, MD, listed on the NRHP in Maryland
- Julian A. Weaver House, Granite Falls, MN, listed on the NRHP in Minnesota
- Gov. Arthur J. Weaver House, Falls City, NE, listed on the NRHP in Nebraska
- Myron Weaver House, Branchport, NY, listed on the NRHP in New York
- Solomon Weaver House, Branchport, NY, listed on the NRHP in New York
- Gen. John G. Weaver House, Utica, NY, listed on the NRHP in New York
- William Weaver House, Piney Creek, NC, listed on the NRHP in North Carolina
- Weaver-Worthington Farmstead, Canyonville, OR, listed on the NRHP in Oregon
- Valentine Weaver House, Macungie, PA, listed on the NRHP in Pennsylvania
- Henry Weaver Farmstead, Terre Hill, PA, listed on the NRHP in Pennsylvania
- Weber-Weaver Farm, West Lampeter, PA, listed on the NRHP in Pennsylvania
- Clement Weaver-Daniel Howland House, East Greenwich, RI, listed on the NRHP in Rhode Island
- Weaver House (Cowie Corner, Virginia), listed on the NRHP in Virginia
- Lawrence and Lydia Weaver House, Spokane, WA, listed on the NRHP in Washington (See Alfred D. Jones (architect).)
