= Wagener House =

Wagener House may refer to the following historic houses in Yates County, New York, United States

- Abraham Wagener House
- Charles Wagener House
- H. Allen Wagener House
