= Branchport =

Branchport may refer to:

- Branchport, New Jersey
- Branchport, New York
