= Sherman Williams =

Sherman Williams may refer to:

- Sherman Williams (American football) (born 1971), former professional American football running back
- Sherman Williams (boxer) (born 1972), Bahamian heavyweight boxer

== See also ==
- Sherman Williams House and Fruit Barn, a historic home and barn in Jerusalem, Yates County, New York
