= Wagener =

Wagener may refer to:

- Wagener (surname)
- Wagener (apple), a cultivar of apple; parent of the Idared
- Wagener, South Carolina, a town in the United States
- Wagener House (disambiguation), several historic houses in Yates County, New York, United States
- Wagener Stadium, a multi-purpose stadium in Amstelveen, Netherlands
