= Smith McLoud House =

Historic house in New York, United States

- U.S. National Register of Historic Places
- Location within New York Location within the United States
- Location: Italy Tpk., Italy, New York
- Coordinates: 42°36′6″N 77°15′51″W
- Area: 22 acres (8.9 ha)
- Built: 1830
- Architectural style: Greek Revival
- MPS: Yates County MPS
- NRHP reference No.: 94000944
- Added to NRHP: August 22, 1994

Smith McLoud House is a historic home located at Middlesex in Yates County, New York. This Greek Revival–style structure was built about 1830 and features a five-by-two-bay rectangular rubble stone central block with molded cornice and wooden corner pilasters, bold frieze and trabeated entrance.

It was listed on the National Register of Historic Places in 1994.
