= Keuka Lake State Park =

State park in Yates County, New York

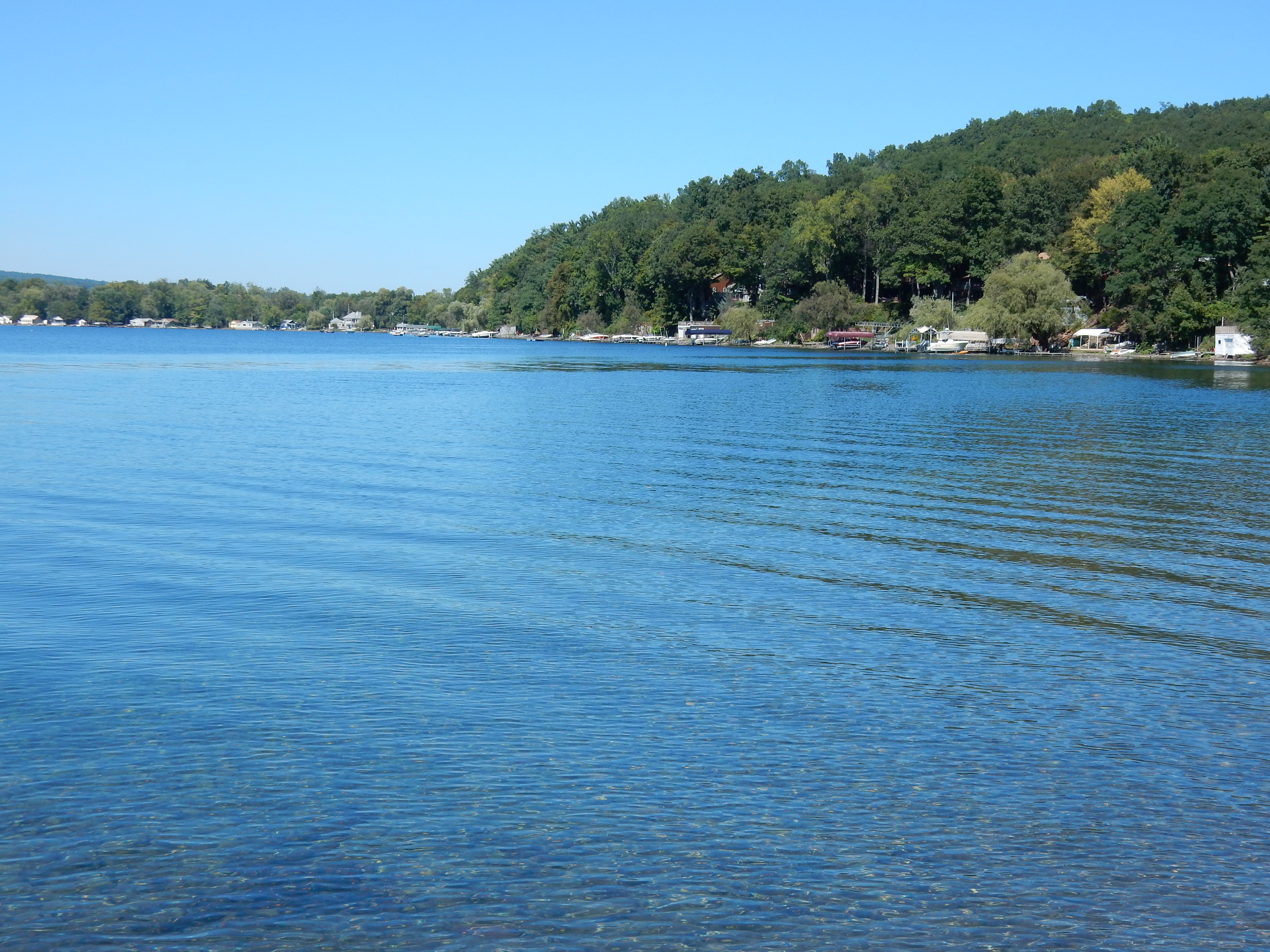
- Keuka Lake, looking north from Keuka Lake State Park

- Location within New York
- Type: State park
- Location: 3560 Pepper Road; Bluff Point, New York
- Coordinates: 42°35′30″N 77°08′00″W
- Area: 621 acres (2.51 km^{2})
- Operator: New York State Office of Parks, Recreation and Historic Preservation
- Visitors: 102,883 (in 2014)
- Open: All year
- Website: Keuka Lake State Park

Keuka Lake State Park is a 621-acre (2.51 km^{2}) state park located in Yates County, New York. The park is located on the north end of the west branch of Keuka Lake, one of the Finger Lakes. The park is in the southeast part of the town of Jerusalem, southeast of Branchport.

== Description ==
Keuka Lake State Park offers picnic tables with pavilions, a playground, hiking, hunting and fishing, cross-country skiing and snowmobiling, a boat launch, and a campground with tent and trailer sites.

Located within the park is the Beddoe–Rose Family Cemetery, listed on the National Register of Historic Places in 2014. Road access to the park are closed during peak season in the summer to limit car traffic, but re-opened during the off-season.

== See also ==
- List of New York state parks
