= Yates County Genealogical and Historical Society =

Coordinates: 42.663326°N 77.056249°W

The Yates County Genealogical and Historical Society focuses on the history of Yates County, New York. It operates the Yates History Center, which consists of three museums in the village of Penn Yan, New York: the 19th century period Oliver House Museum, the L. Caroline Underwood Museum with historic decorative arts items and displays of local history, and the adjacent Scherer Carriage House which features exhibits about the local evangelist known as the Public Universal Friend.

== Headquarters ==
In 1946, the Village of Penn Yan turned over rooms in the Oliver House. The Oliver family bequeathed the house and a fund for its maintenance and operation to the village of Penn Yan. In July 1948, the Society officially opened the door to their new museum.

== History ==
The Yates County Genealogical and Historical Society was incorporated in 1860. It was collecting works for 80 years, until it found a permanent place to keep its documents. On January 10, 1860, an announcement was made in the local newspaper that "a meeting of those who were settlers of the territory embraced in Yates County prior to its establishment, February 5, 1823, and their descendants, will be held at the office of John L. Lewis Jr., in Penn Yan, on Saturday, January 21, 1860, at one o’clock in the afternoon, for the purpose of adopting measures to form a County Historical Society, for the collection of the memorials of the early settlement of the towns in the county and of the early settlers, and other kindred facts connected with the history of the county."

The meeting was held and Russell A. Hunt was chosen as the chairman. There was a resolution offered by William M. Oliver and it was adopted and it read ‘Resolved, That it is expedient to organize and form a County Historical Society for the purpose of collection and preserving the memorials of the early settlement of the county and of the early settlers and all other facts connected with the history of the county, including Indian antiquity and history, and that the necessary measures be taken for the purpose.” A group of 32 men from the nearby towns of Milo, Benton, Jerusalem, Middlesex and Potter signed the resolution.

After the initial resolution and members put into place the members of the historical society went from place to place around the county finding relics and other documents that were taken to houses for storage. Evidence of the activity of the Society becomes scarce until the twentieth century until a newspaper article in 1915 that brought it back to life: “Yates County is full of historic relics of which should be preserved. There are articles innumerable scattered throughout the community which are associated with the early history of the county and which would make an invaluable collection if they were brought together. With no one to look after them and with no central place to keep them, they will be lost in a few years and never can be regained. If we had a Historical Society in the county it would be an easy matter to take some steps in regard to this matter.”

The historical society again faded in and out throughout the years with many newspaper articles in the mid-1920s asking what had happened to the society and also asking readers to form a society. The articles were complaining that nearby counties were getting artifacts from Yates County that was considered historic and valuable. In 1926 the editor of the Penn Yan Democrat asked the question: What do you think of organizing a historical society in Yates County? At the end of the article, which was on the front page he listed names of men and women who had expressed interest in performing this task. In 1927 there was a meeting that was held of those who were interested and yet another article in the Penn Yan Democrat which was a letter to the editor asking what had happened to the previous historical society and asking “has it died again”. In 1928 an organization finally started to materialize under the leadership of Arthur Bailey. The by-laws were once again written up and he applied for a charter from New York State. In 1929 the charter was granted. The Yates County Genealogical and Historical Society, Inc. only had one member out of the original fifty members of the 1860 organization. In 1929 there was an additional charter issued under the name Yates County Genealogical and Historical Society, Inc. which is still in use today.

In 1930 the society produced its first publication that was up for sale: Memories of Local Naturalists.

The Yates County Genealogical and Historical Society celebrated its 150-year anniversary in 2010.

== Museums ==
The Yates County Genealogical and Historical Society offer a collection of three museums located in the village of Penn Yan, New York. The L. Caroline Underwood Museum located at 107 Chapel Street, the Scherer Carriage House located behind the L. Caroline Underwood Museum, and the Oliver House Museum located on the corner of Main Street and Chapel Street.

=== Oliver House Museum ===
The Oliver house was built in 1852 on Main Street in Penn Yan. Andrew Ferguson Oliver married Margaret Sutphen and gave the house as a wedding present to their son William. William had three children all of them living there their entire lives and having no children, Carrie Oliver who was the last to die in 1942 left the house to the Village of Penn Yan in her will along with a fund. The house has been used for many different organizations throughout the years which were per request of Carrie Oliver. The most interesting being the Red Cross recounted by Cecyl White a returning soldier in 1945 saying “Red Cross headquarters are now in the back rooms of the Oliver house at the corner of Main and Chapel Streets”. The Yates County Genealogical and Historical Society operate it as museum keeping many of the portraits and original furnishings of the house while also having a changing exhibit. The doors were officially opened in 1948.

In 1975 the Oliver House Museum went through a restoration and re-opened to the public that same year and has been operating in Penn Yan ever since with expanding collections and exhibits, including many of the Oliver family's belongings from the time period. In 1977 the society launched an endowment fund drive that would last 10 years to try and raise 250,000 dollars. The endowment was started to cover operating expenses for the active county society and to provide “firm financial basis from which to operate its programs and to carry on its day to day basis”. The Oliver Fund was administered by the village board and used only for the property and not for the operation of the genealogical and historical society, all the money was used for plumbing and the redecorating of the house.

=== L. Caroline Underwood Museum ===
L. Caroline Underwood was a teacher for 50 years with 47 of those years in the Penn Yan School District. She left most of her estate to establish the museum which provided preservation for her favorite collection of pieces. The operation of the museum is partnered with the Yates County Genealogical and Historical Society. The museum is open year-round and with changing exhibits as well as permanent exhibits which was a direct request from Underwood in her will. Inside the museum it is the home of the Catherine A. Spencer Research Center which contains publications, genealogical information, and collected information on topics in Yates County history. Also in the research center are maps, census indexes, directories and cemetery records. The L. Caroline Underwood Museum and Research Center was officially opened in 2004.

=== Scherer Carriage House ===
The Scherer Carriage House is located behind the Underwood Museum and is the home to the exhibit of evangelist known as the Public Universal Friend, who formed the first white settlement in what is now Yates County. The community was the largest that had traveled that far west in New York State. The exhibit includes the preacher's portrait, bible, hat, coachee and saddle. The Yates County Genealogical and Historical Society is the main repository for the objects and documents which belonged to the evangelist or the Society of Universal Friends.
