= Mortimer Murrey Benton =

American politician (1807–1885)

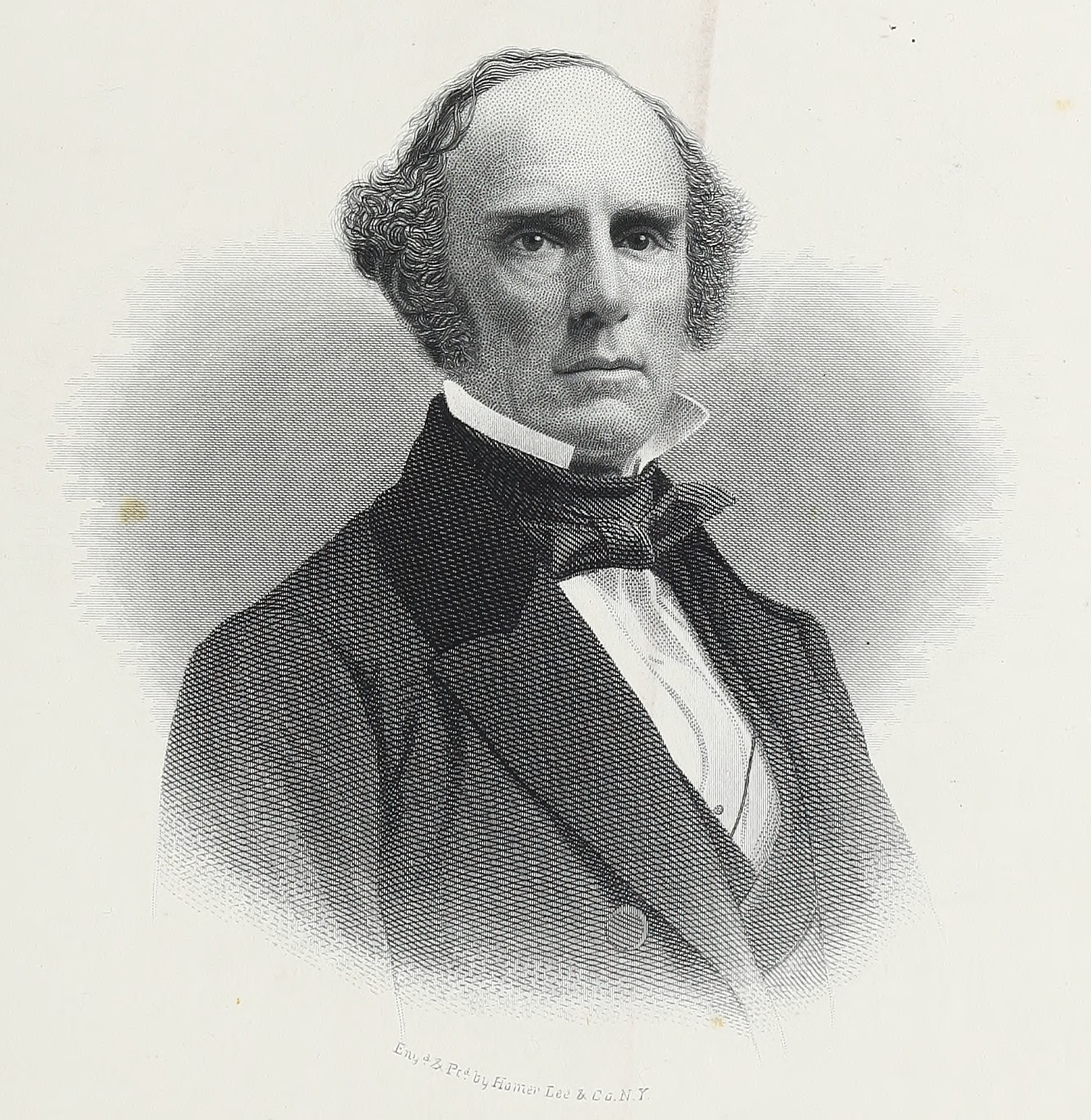

Member of the Kentucky House of Representatives from Kenton County
- In office 1863–1865

Mayor of Covington
- In office 1834–1835
- Preceded by: office established
- Succeeded by: William W. Southgate

Personal details
- Born: January 21, 1807 Benton, New York, U.S.
- Died: March 5, 1885 (aged 78) Covington, Kentucky, U.S.
- Spouse: Angeline Clemons

Mortimer Murrey Benton (January 21, 1807 – March 5, 1885) was an American lawyer and politician who served as the first mayor of Covington, Kentucky.

== Biography ==
Benton was born in Benton, New York, and was educated at private schools. In 1817 he moved with his father's family to Franklin County, Indiana, and then in 1827 moved to Cincinnati, where he become a store clerk and studied law. Around 1828 he moved to Covington, Kentucky, and was admitted to the bar in 1831. He married Angeline Clemons on March 10, 1832. In 1834 Benton become the first mayor of Covington, and later represented Kenton County in the Kentucky House of Representatives from 1863 to 1865. He died in 1885 at his home in Covington.

== Professional timeline ==
Year/period	Role
1831	Admitted to Kentucky bar
1834–1835	First mayor of Covington
1835	Covington city clerk
1839–1851	Covington city council
1844	Attorney in partnership Benton & Mooar
1853–1856	President of Covington & Lexington Railroad
until 1861	Attorney in partnership Benton & Nixon
1863–1865	Kentucky House, Kenton County
1865–1866	Kentucky Senate

He appears to have been a landowner, a status commonly associated with many affluent and prominent residents of Covington during that period. This was especially true after the creation of the railroad line that continued from Covington and passed through the town now commonly referred to as Kenton in southern Kenton County, KY. No doubt this is the reasoning in part for the RR station in Kenton to be referred to as "Benton Station" for some periods of time.

After the creation of the rail line to and through Kenton, it opened up all of the areas to and continuing past to various of forms of development and expansion. This led to the migration of persons from the north to newly created settlements and some areas of retreat for families of Cincinnati and Covington to locations such as Ryland Heights. These areas were often summer accommodations for these more well to do families as there were now connected with passenger train service on a regular basis.

He and Angeline had many children together, 10 were known with many having died at a very young age.

Also he served as a member of then named Covington and Lexington RR, later renamed KCRR (Kentucky Central Railroad).

During his tenure as a member of the CLRR, He served as:

- attorney for the Covington & Lexington Railroad
- director
- later president of the railroad (1853–1856)
