= Hunt Country Vineyards =

Vineyard and winery in New York, US

Coordinates: 42°35′54″N 77°10′15″W

Hunt Country Vineyards is a vineyard and winery located near Keuka Lake in the Finger Lakes AVA region of New York State, US.

== History ==
Hunt Country Vineyards was founded in 1981 by Arthur C. Hunt and Joyce H. Hunt. The property was first purchased by Arthur Hunt's great great grandfather, Ambrose Hunt (b. 1803) in 1852 and has been farmed continuously by his descendants until the present day. The oldest grapevines on the vineyard were planted in 1904 and are of the concord and Niagara varieties. When the current generation of Hunts took over the farm in 1973, there were 18 acres (7.3 ha) of the two varieties planted. In 2008, 50 acres (20 ha) of grapes were harvested.

== Geography ==
The farm is located 1 mile (1.6 km) west of Branchport, New York. The vineyard soils are glacially deposited gravelly loam, with a 5–7% slope.

== Viticulture ==
The Hunts enrich the soil with natural compost made from the grape pomace (seeds and skins) left after pressing the grapes, mixed with manure from a neighboring farm.

Between 1984 and 1988, the Hunts collaborated with Cornell Cooperative Extension Grape Specialist Dr. Tom Zabadal to convert undesirable grape varieties to more promising wine varieties by the use of field grafting in cold climate vineyards. Under normal conditions, it takes seven years to convert a vineyard to a new variety. This includes removing old vines, planting other crops to replenish the soil and remove all traces of the old root stock, replanting new vines and allowing them to grow to maturity. The field grafting process reduced the time to two years.

The vineyard produces several French-American varieties, including Seyval blanc, Vignoles, Vidal blanc, and De Chaunac, as well as three Cornell varieties: Cayuga White, Horizon and Valvin Muscat. Two Vitis vinifera varieties are also produced: Riesling and Cabernet Franc, and three native varieties: Concord, Niagara and Delaware grape. The vines yield an average of 4-6 tons of grapes per acre.

== Experimental and sustainable practices ==
Hunt Country Vineyards current experimental agricultural techniques include English ground ivy (partly funded by the USDA SARE program, planted under and between rows of grapes to reduce the need for herbicides and mowing), biodiesel from waste grease (to power tractors), along with a small wind turbine for producing electricity, and bat houses to encourage natural insect predators.

In 2020, the New York Wine & Grape Foundation awarded Hunt Country Vineyards the Sustainability Award for “noteworthy sustainable practices and a commitment to conserving natural resources, protecting our environment, and contributing to the overall success of the New York State economy.”

== Wine production and distribution ==
Hunt Country Vineyards produces an average of 12,000 cases per year of 21 different wines, and has a production capacity of 70,000 gallons. The winery is perhaps best known for its Vidal Ice Wine, which is a dessert wine produced in colder wine regions when grapes are left on the vine late into the winter. The grapes are hand picked and pressed frozen, leaving the water behind as ice. The concentrated juice is then fermented to produce this intensely sweet dessert wine.

The Vidal ice wine was featured on NBC's Today Show in 2006.
