= James Hobart House =

Historic house in New York, United States

- U.S. National Register of Historic Places
- Location within New York Location within the United States
- Location: 4646 Italy Valley Rd., Potter, New York
- Coordinates: 42°41′39″N 77°12′47″W
- Area: 147 acres (59 ha)
- Built: 1885
- Architectural style: Italianate
- MPS: Yates County MPS
- NRHP reference No.: 94000941
- Added to NRHP: August 24, 1994

James Hobart House is a historic home located at Potter in Yates County, New York. It is an Italianate style dwelling built about 1855. It was listed on the National Register of Historic Places in 1994.
