= Ezikial Perry House =

Historic house in New York, United States

- U.S. National Register of Historic Places
- Location within New York Location within the United States
- Location: 287 Sherman Hollow Rd., Jerusalem, New York
- Coordinates: 42°40′1″N 77°5′57″W
- Area: 12.4 acres (5.0 ha)
- Built: 1870
- Architectural style: Italianate
- MPS: Yates County MPS
- NRHP reference No.: 94000949
- Added to NRHP: August 24, 1994

Ezikial Perry House is a historic home located at Jerusalem in Yates County, New York, USA. It is a two-story, Italianate style frame dwelling built about 1870. It sits on a stone foundation and has a low-pitched hipped roof with dormers and cupola. Also on the property are two wood-frame sheds dated to about 1870.

It was listed on the National Register of Historic Places in 1994.
