= John Carr House =

Historic house in New York, United States

- U.S. National Register of Historic Places
- Location within New York Location within the United States
- Location: NY 245, Middlesex, New York
- Coordinates: 42°41′46″N 77°16′40″W
- Area: 8.1 acres (3.3 ha)
- Built: 1847
- Architectural style: Greek Revival
- MPS: Yates County MPS
- NRHP reference No.: 94000931
- Added to NRHP: August 24, 1994

John Carr House, also known as Daniel Bostwick House, is a historic home located at Middlesex in Yates County, New York. It is a Greek Revival style structure built about 1847.

It was listed on the National Register of Historic Places in 1994.
