= Abner Woodworth House =

Historic house in New York, United States

- U.S. National Register of Historic Places
- Location within New York Location within the United States
- Location: Flat St., Benton, New York
- Coordinates: 42°41′30″N 77°3′14″W
- Area: 24 acres (9.7 ha)
- Built: 1830
- Architectural style: Greek Revival
- MPS: Yates County MPS
- NRHP reference No.: 94000969
- Added to NRHP: August 24, 1994

Abner Woodworth House is a historic home located at Benton in Yates County, New York. It is a Greek Revival style structure built about 1830.

It was listed on the National Register of Historic Places in 1994.
