= Overackers Corners Schoolhouse =

- U.S. National Register of Historic Places
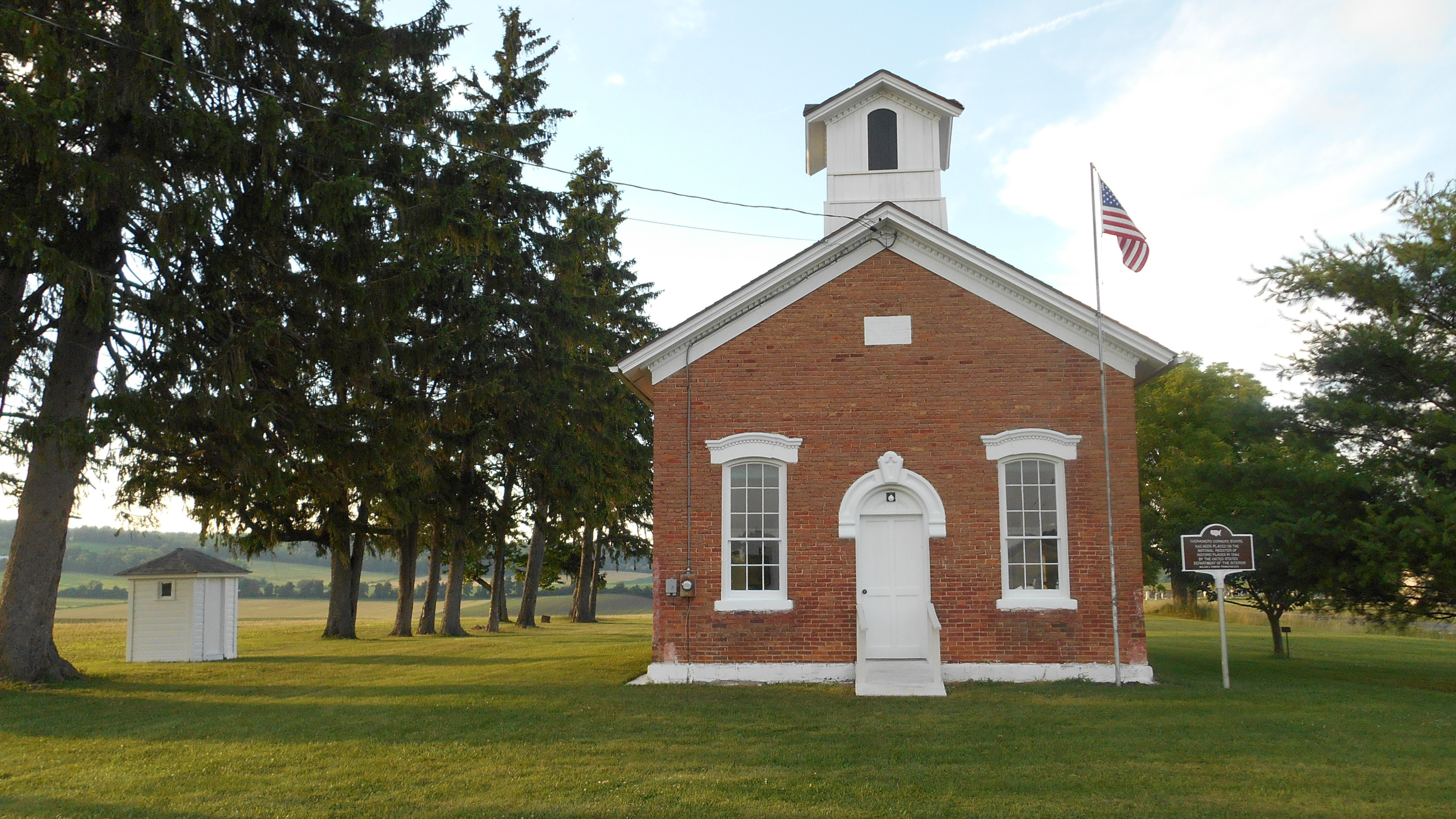

- Location within New York Location within the United States
- Location: Vine Valley Rd., Middlesex, New York
- Coordinates: 42°44′21″N 77°16′49″W
- Area: less than one acre
- Built: 1874
- Architectural style: Italianate
- MPS: Yates County MPS
- NRHP reference No.: 94000948
- Added to NRHP: August 24, 1994

Overackers Corners Schoolhouse is a historic school located at Middlesex in Yates County, New York. It is an Italianate style structure built about 1874. The school reopened in 1998 after renovation by the Middlesex Heritage Group.

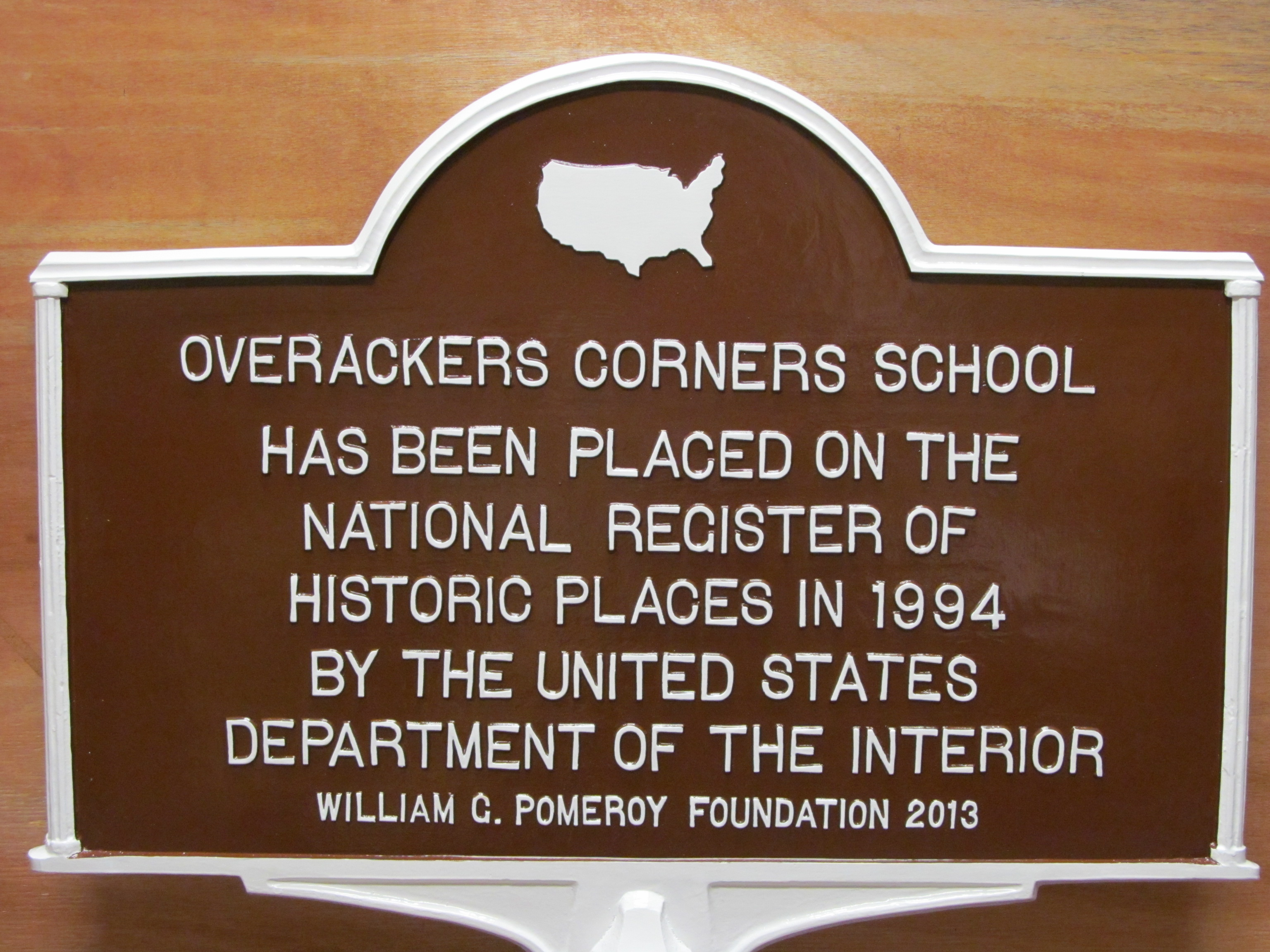

It was listed on the National Register of Historic Places in 1994.

Overackers Corners School 1874 – 1938 [4]

In 1874, the brick schoolhouse on the corner of North Vine Valley Road and State Route 364 was built. The school was heated by a large round stove, had no running water, and no electricity. Students daily carried water from a local well to the school. There was a large woodshed, and as required, there were two separate outhouses. The teacher's desk was on a platform just inside the front door. The school was used until June 1938 when the Middlesex schools were consolidated. The last teacher was Hazel Dinehart Robeson.

After it closed, the building was sold to Leon G. Button, who used it for grain storage until 1989 when it was leased to the Middlesex Heritage Group. In 1998, after 10 years of renovations, the school was opened as a museum. The school was placed on the National and State Registry of Historic Places in 1994. In 2014, the Pomeroy Foundation donated a plaque recognizing this achievement.

Facts About the Overackers Corners School

• Built in 1874 on land purchased from Edward and Margaret Hennessy

• It was designated District #3, Town of Middlesex, for grades 1 – 8

• Named after a family that lived nearby

• Bricks from a nearby blacksmith shop were crumbled and used as a foundation for the school

• Bricks for the walls may have been made in a brick factory that was located on the next door Button Farm

• Closed after the 1937-38 school year due to the centralization of schools as Middlesex Valley Central School District

• Some of the teachers who taught there were: Lillian Boyd, Gordon Foster, Nellie Bennett, Mrs. Stanley Voorhees, Ruth Halstead, Carrie Razey, Lela Robson, Nellie Button, Bertha Noble, Alice DeWick, Patrick H. Sheehan, Frank Matteson, Harlan Smith, and Hazel Dinehart Robeson

• Sold at a public auction to Leon G. Button on November 11, 1939 for $128.50

• 1953 Anson Wagar presented a 4’ X 5’ picture of the school to hang in the Middlesex Valley School. After many years it was taken down and stored where it was damaged. In 2014, the Middlesex Heritage Group was awarded a grant to restore the painting. It is currently on display at the Town Hall in Middlesex.

• The picture of the school was in the November 1933 issue of National Geographic, page 560.
