= St. Luke's Episcopal Church (Jerusalem, New York) =

Historic church in New York, United States

- U.S. National Register of Historic Places
- Location within New York Location within the United States
- Location: W. Lake Rd. (Co. Rt. 54A), Jerusalem, New York
- Coordinates: 42°35′48″N 77°9′11″W
- Area: less than one acre
- Built: 1867
- Architectural style: Gothic Revival
- MPS: Yates County MPS
- NRHP reference No.: 94000954
- Added to NRHP: August 24, 1994

St. Luke's Episcopal Church is a historic Episcopal church located at Jerusalem in Yates County, New York, United States. It is a Gothic Revival style structure built about 1867.

It was listed on the National Register of Historic Places in 1994.
