= Italy, New York =

- Town
- Location in Yates County and the state of New York.
- Coordinates: 42°36′39″N 77°18′22″W
- Country: United States
- State: New York
- County: Yates

Area
  - Total: 40.26 sq mi (104.28 km^{2})
  - Land: 40.14 sq mi (103.96 km^{2})
  - Water: 0.12 sq mi (0.32 km^{2})
- Elevation: 1,913 ft (583 m)

Population (2010)
  - Total: 1,141
  - Estimate (2016): 1,150
  - Density: 28.6/sq mi (11.06/km^{2})
- Time zone: UTC-5 (Eastern (EST))
  - Summer (DST): UTC-4 (EDT)
- FIPS code: 36-38044
- GNIS feature ID: 0979098
- Website: https://www.italyny.gov/

Italy is a town located in Yates County, New York, United States. As of the 2010 census, the town had a total population of 1,141. The town takes its name from the country of Italy.

The Town of Italy is in the southwestern part of the county and is south of Canandaigua.

== History ==
The first European settlers arrived around 1790. The town was part of the Phelps and Gorham Purchase.

The town was founded in 1815 from the Town of Naples while still part of Ontario County. When Yates county was established in 1823, the Town of Italy became part of the new county.

The town is the location of a large elm tree that was once a council site for local natives.

The Smith McLoud House, Italy Valley Methodist Church, and James Fox House are listed on the National Register of Historic Places.

== Geography ==
According to the United States Census Bureau, the town has a total area of 40.3 square miles (104 km^{2}), of which 40.2 square miles (104 km^{2}) is land and 0.1 square miles (0.26 km^{2}) is water. The total area is 0.27% water.

Italy is noted for its sharp hills and upland areas. Flint Creek and West River are two important streams located here. West River flows in a southwest direction through the town of Naples eventually emptying into Canandaigua Lake. Flint Creek has two spring heads flowing East/ northeast separately to the valley floor where they join up. Flint Creek flows through Potter to eventually empty into Lake Ontario. Many small mills were located along this creek. Nothing but the occasional grind stone remains as any suggestion of this.

The western town line is the border of Ontario County, and the southern town line is the border of Steuben County. The town is at the south end of Canandaigua Lake and a small part of the lake is inside the northern town line.

== Demographics ==
Historical population
Census	Pop.	Note	%±
1820	728		—
1830	1,092		50.0%
1840	1,634		49.6%
1850	1,627		−0.4%
1860	1,605		−1.4%
1870	1,341		−16.4%
1880	1,444		7.7%
1890	1,206		−16.5%
1900	1,094		−9.3%
1910	861		−21.3%
1920	731		−15.1%
1930	510		−30.2%
1940	457		−10.4%
1950	455		−0.4%
1960	428		−5.9%
1970	532		24.3%
1980	953		79.1%
1990	1,120		17.5%
2000	1,087		−2.9%
2010	1,141		5.0%
2016 (est.)	1,150		0.8%
U.S. Decennial Census

As of the census of 2000, there were 1,087 people, 421 households, and 293 families residing in the town. The population density was 27.1 inhabitants per square mile (10.5/km^{2}). There were 584 housing units at an average density of 14.5 per square mile (5.6/km^{2}). The racial makeup of the town was 98.34% White, 0.09% African American, 0.09% Native American, 0.18% Asian, 0.00% Pacific Islander, 0.37% from other races, and 0.92% from two or more races. 0.55% of the population were Hispanic or Latino of any race.

There were 421 households, out of which 31.1% had children under the age of 18 living with them, 56.5% were married couples living together, 6.7% had a female householder with no husband present, and 30.2% were non-families. 21.1% of all households were made up of individuals, and 6.2% had someone living alone who was 65 years of age or older. The average household size was 2.58 and the average family size was 2.96.

In the town, the population was spread out, with 24.0% under the age of 18, 8.6% from 18 to 24, 29.9% from 25 to 44, 27.2% from 45 to 64, and 10.3% who were 65 years of age or older. The median age was 38 years. For every 100 females, there were 103.6 males. For every 100 females age 18 and over, there were 105.5 males.

The median income for a household in the town was $33,750, and the median income for a family was $36,250. Males had a median income of $25,795 versus $24,167 for females. The per capita income for the town was $14,472. 12.7% of the population and 7.6% of families were below the poverty line. 18.4% of those under the age of 18 and 1.2% of those 65 and older were living below the poverty line.

== Communities and locations in the Town of Italy ==
- Flint Creek – A stream flowing through the middle of the town.
- Italy (formerly "Italy Hollow") – The hamlet of Italy is on County Road 18 in the south-central part of the town.
- Italy Hill – A hamlet near the east town line on County Roads 34 and 35.
- Italy-Naples – A location near the west town line.
- West River – A stream in the north part of the town.
- Woodville – A hamlet by the northwest town line (in Ontario County) on NY-12.
- Sunnyside – A community of Canandaigua Lake front properties on Sunnyside Road.
