= Uriah Hanford House =

Historic house in New York, United States

- U.S. National Register of Historic Places
- Location within New York Location within the United States
- Location: W. Lake Rd., Jerusalem, New York
- Coordinates: 42°39′12″N 77°4′35″W
- Area: less than one acre
- Built: 1825
- Architectural style: Greek Revival
- MPS: Yates County MPS
- NRHP reference No.: 94000938
- Added to NRHP: August 24, 1994

Uriah Hanford House is a historic home located at Jerusalem in Yates County, New York. It is a Greek Revival style structure built about 1825. f>

It was listed on the National Register of Historic Places in 1994.
