= George Hays House =

Historic house in New York, United States

- U.S. National Register of Historic Places
- Location within New York Location within the United States
- Location: County House Rd., Jerusalem, New York
- Coordinates: 42°40′1″N 77°4′26″W
- Area: 8.5 acres (3.4 ha)
- Built: 1872
- Architect: Alloington, Jacob
- Architectural style: Gothic Revival
- MPS: Yates County MPS
- NRHP reference No.: 94000939
- Added to NRHP: August 24, 1994

George Hays House is a historic home located in Jerusalem, Yates County, New York, United States. It is a Gothic Revival style structure built about 1872.

It was listed on the National Register of Historic Places in 1994.
