= Italy Valley Methodist Church =

Historic church in New York, United States

- U.S. National Register of Historic Places
- Location within New York Location within the United States
- Location: Italy Valley Rd., Italy, New York
- Coordinates: 42°36′39″N 77°17′32″W
- Area: less than one acre
- Built: ca. 1856
- Architectural style: Greek Revival
- MPS: Yates County MPS
- NRHP reference No.: 94000942
- Added to NRHP: August 24, 1994

Italy Valley Methodist Church is a historic Methodist church located at Italy in Yates County, New York. It is a Greek Revival style structure built about 1856.

It was listed on the National Register of Historic Places in 1994.
