= Hampstead (Jerusalem, New York) =

Historic house in New York, United States

- U.S. National Register of Historic Places
- Location within New York Location within the United States
- Location: 3170 Co. Rt. 54A, Jerusalem, New York
- Coordinates: 42°36′14″N 77°6′48″W
- Area: 160 acres (65 ha)
- Built: 1840
- Architectural style: Greek Revival
- MPS: Yates County MPS
- NRHP reference No.: 94000937
- Added to NRHP: August 24, 1994

Hampstead, also known as Henry Rose House, is a historic home located at Jerusalem in Yates County, New York. This Greek Revival style structure was built about 1840 and features a monumentally proportioned temple portico with full pediment and wide entablature supported by massive two story columns.

It was listed on the National Register of Historic Places in 1994.
