= Middlesex Center Methodist Church =

Historic church in New York, United States

- U.S. National Register of Historic Places
- Location within New York Location within the United States
- Location: Main St., Middlesex, New York
- Coordinates: 42°42′26″N 77°16′12″W
- Area: less than one acre
- Built: 1881
- Architectural style: Romanesque
- MPS: Yates County MPS
- NRHP reference No.: 94000945
- Added to NRHP: August 24, 1994

Middlesex Center Methodist Church is a historic Methodist church located at Middlesex in Yates County, New York. It is a Romanesque style structure built about 1881.

It was listed on the National Register of Historic Places in 1994.
