= Vine Valley Methodist Church =

Historic church in New York, United States

- U.S. National Register of Historic Places
- Location within New York Location within the United States
- Location: Robeson Rd., Middlesex, New York
- Coordinates: 42°43′26″N 77°19′29″W
- Area: less than one acre
- Built: 1891
- Architectural style: Queen Anne
- MPS: Yates County MPS
- NRHP reference No.: 94000958
- Added to NRHP: August 24, 1994

Vine Valley Methodist Church is United Methodist Church congregation, housed in a historic church located at Middlesex in Yates County, New York, USA.

The structure is a Queen Anne style structure built about 1891.

It was listed on the National Register of Historic Places in 1994.
