= Solomon Weaver House =

Historic house in New York, United States

- U.S. National Register of Historic Places
- Location within New York Location within the United States
- Location: 7 S. Main St., Branchport, New York
- Coordinates: 42°35′53″N 77°9′22″W
- Area: 47 acres (19 ha)
- Built: 1844
- Architectural style: Italianate
- MPS: Yates County MPS
- NRHP reference No.: 94000963
- Added to NRHP: August 24, 1994

Solomon Weaver House is a historic home located at Jerusalem in Yates County, New York. It is an Italianate style dwelling built about 1844.

It was listed on the National Register of Historic Places in 1994.
