= Beddoe–Rose Family Cemetery =

Historic cemetery in New York, United States

- U.S. National Register of Historic Places
- Location within New York Location within the United States
- Location: E. of W. Bluff Dr., Keuka Lake State Park, Jerusalem, New York
- Coordinates: 42°34′57″N 77°07′55″W
- Area: Less than 1 acre (0.40 ha)
- Built: c. 1815
- NRHP reference No.: 14000939
- Added to NRHP: November 19, 2014

Beddoe–Rose Family Cemetery is a historic cemetery located in Keuka Lake State Park at Jerusalem in Yates County, New York. It was established about 1815, and is a settlement era burial ground containing the graves of 14 members of the Beddoe and Rose families. The cemetery remained an active burial ground until 1908. The farm property was acquired for Keuka Lake State Park in the 1950s and the farmhouse subsequently demolished.

It was listed on the National Register of Historic Places in 2014.
