= Larzelere Tavern =

Historic commercial building in New York, United States

- U.S. National Register of Historic Places
- Location within New York Location within the United States
- Nearest city: Branchport, New York
- Coordinates: 42°37′36″N 77°9′45″W
- Area: 1 acre (0.40 ha)
- Built: 1823
- Architectural style: Early Republic, Federal
- NRHP reference No.: 97001525
- Added to NRHP: December 19, 1997

Larzelere Tavern is a historic inn and tavern located two miles north of Branchport in Yates County, New York. It is a large, 2-story, three-bay-wide, four-bay-deep, rectangular gable-roofed main block with a 1 1/2-story, gable-roofed side wing. Also on the property are two historic outhouses and a shed / garage. Built originally as an inn and tavern, the structure was later used as a Grange Hall and later as a bed and breakfast.

It was listed on the National Register of Historic Places in 1997.
