= Bates Cobblestone Farmhouse =

Historic house in New York, United States

- U.S. National Register of Historic Places
- New York State Register of Historic Places
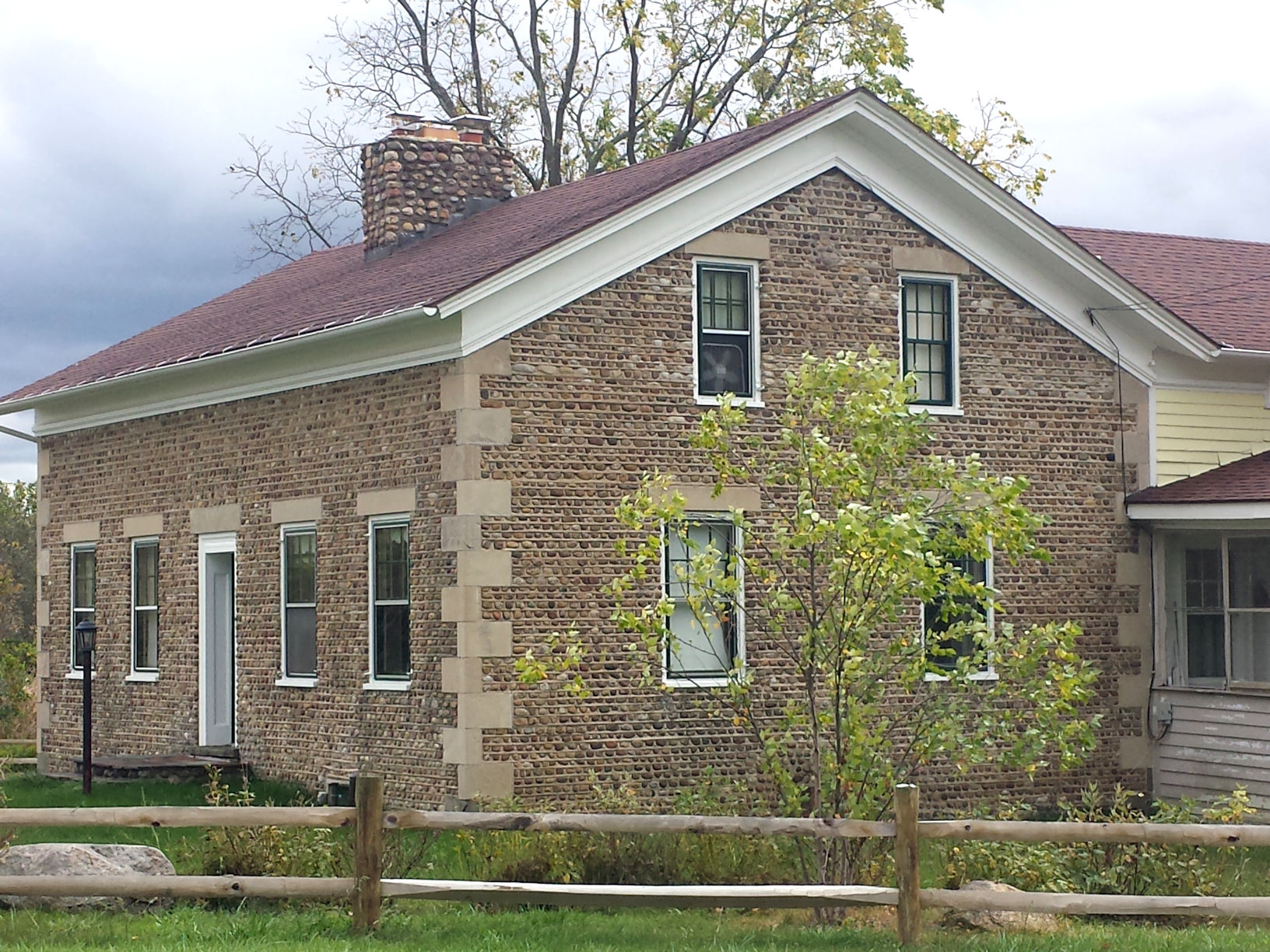

- Location within New York Location within the United States
- Location: 5521 NY 364, Middlesex, New York
- Coordinates: 42°45′34″N 77°16′25″W
- Area: 50.8 acres (20.6 ha)
- Built: 1836
- Architectural style: Mid 19th Century Revival
- MPS: Cobblestone Architecture of New York State MPS
- NRHP reference No.: 92000436
- NYSRHP No.: 12305.000008

Significant dates
- Added to NRHP: May 11, 1992
- Designated NYSRHP: March 20, 1992

Bates Cobblestone Farmhouse is a historic home located at Middlesex in Yates County, New York. The farmhouse was built about 1836 and is a one-and-a-half-story, five bay cobblestone building with a one-and-a-half-story frame rear wing. The house is built of relatively rough and irregularly shaped, sized and colored field cobbles. The farmhouse is among the nine surviving cobblestone buildings in Yates County. Also on the property are two early 20th century contributing support structures.

It was listed on the National Register of Historic Places in 1992.
