= Yatesville Methodist Church =

Historic church in New York, United States

- U.S. National Register of Historic Places
- Location within New York Location within the United States
- Location: Yatesville Rd., Potter, New York
- Coordinates: 42°40′18″N 77°8′16″W
- Area: less than one acre
- Built: ca. 1837
- Architectural style: Greek Revival
- MPS: Yates County MPS
- NRHP reference No.: 94000971
- Added to NRHP: August 25, 1994

Yatesville Methodist Church is a historic Methodist church in Potter, Yates County, New York. It is a Greek Revival style structure built about 1837.

It was listed on the National Register of Historic Places in 1994.
