= Benton, New York =

- Town
- Location in Yates County and the state of New York.
- Coordinates: 42°43′20″N 77°2′58″W
- Country: United States
- State: New York
- County: Yates

Area
  - Total: 44.44 sq mi (115.09 km^{2})
  - Land: 41.47 sq mi (107.41 km^{2})
  - Water: 2.97 sq mi (7.68 km^{2})
- Elevation: 915 ft (279 m)

Population (2010)
  - Total: 2,836
  - Estimate (2016): 2,803
  - Density: 68/sq mi (26.1/km^{2})
- Time zone: UTC-5 (Eastern (EST))
  - Summer (DST): UTC-4 (EDT)
- FIPS code: 36-06002
- GNIS feature ID: 0978724
- Website: Town Website

Benton is a town in Yates County, New York, United States. The population was 2,836 at the 2010 census. The town is named after an early resident, Levi Benton (1746–1820)

The Town of Benton is located in the northeast part of the county. Benton is on the west side of Seneca Lake, north of Penn Yan.

== History ==
Kashanquash, a village of the Seneca tribe, was located in the northeast part of Benton as late as 1779. The region became part of the Phelps and Gorham Purchase.

The town was formed in 1803 from the Town of Jerusalem before the formation of Yates County. Originally called the "Town of Vernon," the name was changed to "Snell" to avoid confusion with another "Vernon." Finally, the name was changed to "Benton," after Levi Benton, thought to be the first settler in the town.

In 1818, the town was reduced in size by the founding of the Town of Milo. A further loss of territory came about in 1851 when the Town of Torrey was created.

The Angus Cobblestone Farmhouse and Barn Complex, Barden Cobblestone Farmhouse, Jephtha Earl Cobblestone Farmhouse, William Nichols Cobblestone Farmhouse, Whitaker House, and Abner Woodworth House are listed on the National Register of Historic Places.

== Geography ==
According to the United States Census Bureau, the town has a total area of 44.4 square miles (115 km^{2}), of which 41.5 square miles (107 km^{2}) is land and 3.0 square miles (7.8 km^{2}) (6.66%) is water.

The northern town line is the border of Ontario County, and part of the eastern town line, marked by Seneca Lake, is the border of Seneca County.

Benton is in the Finger Lakes region of New York.

New York State Route 14 is a north–south highway along the edge of Seneca Lake, while New York State Route 14A is a north–south highway in the western part of the town. New York State Route 364 crosses the southwestern corner of Benton.

== Demographics ==
Historical population
Census	Pop.	Note	%±
1820	3,357		—
1830	3,957		17.9%
1840	3,911		−1.2%
1850	3,456		−11.6%
1860	2,462		−28.8%
1870	2,422		−1.6%
1880	2,413		−0.4%
1890	2,291		−5.1%
1900	2,179		−4.9%
1910	2,032		−6.7%
1920	1,797		−11.6%
1930	1,845		2.7%
1940	1,879		1.8%
1950	1,866		−0.7%
1960	2,093		12.2%
1970	2,159		3.2%
1980	1,981		−8.2%
1990	2,380		20.1%
2000	2,640		10.9%
2010	2,836		7.4%
2016 (est.)	2,803		−1.2%
U.S. Decennial Census

As of the census of 2000, there were 2,640 people, 864 households, and 642 families residing in the town. The population density was 63.6 inhabitants per square mile (24.6/km^{2}). There were 956 housing units at an average density of 23.0 per square mile (8.9/km^{2}). The racial makeup of the town was 98.86% White, 0.42% African American, 0.15% Asian, 0.08% from other races, and 0.49% from two or more races. Hispanic or Latino of any race were 0.42% of the population.

There were 864 households, out of which 35.2% had children under the age of 18 living with them, 62.5% were married couples living together, 8.4% had a female householder with no husband present, and 25.6% were non-families. 20.5% of all households were made up of individuals, and 8.9% had someone living alone who was 65 years of age or older. The average household size was 2.82 and the average family size was 3.29.

In the town, the population was spread out, with 28.4% under the age of 18, 5.6% from 18 to 24, 23.8% from 25 to 44, 22.8% from 45 to 64, and 19.4% who were 65 years of age or older. The median age was 40 years. For every 100 females, there were 96.9 males. For every 100 females age 18 and over, there were 93.2 males.

The median income for a household in the town was $37,500, and the median income for a family was $43,988. Males had a median income of $26,951 versus $23,250 for females. The per capita income for the town was $16,843. About 7.5% of families and 13.5% of the population were below the poverty line, including 25.2% of those under age 18 and 7.3% of those age 65 or over.

== Notable people ==
- Levi W. Barden, former Wisconsin State Senator
- Joshua Lee, former US Congressman
- James R. Lyon, former Wisconsin State Assemblyman
- Meredith Mallory, former US Congressman
- Mortimer Murrey Benton, first mayor of Covington, Kentucky

== Communities and locations in the Town of Benton ==
- Angus – A hamlet in the southeastern corner of Benton by Seneca Lake on NY Route 14.
- Bellona – A hamlet near the northern town line on County Road 15 (Pre-Emption Road).
- Bellona Station – A location southwest of Bellona, on Bellona Station Road. Known in the early 1900s as Gage and once home to a United States Post Office, Bellona Station was the location of a Pennsylvania Railroad freight and passenger station until the late 1940s or early 1950s, when the station was destroyed by fire.
- Benton – The hamlet of Benton is on NY-14.
- Benton Center – A location west of Benton hamlet on County Road 14 at the junction of NY-14A.
- Ferguson Corners – A location in the northwestern corner of the town on County Road 2.
- Havens Corners – A hamlet northwest of Penn Yan village and east of Benton Center on County Road 14.
- Kashong Point – A projection into Seneca Lake, partly in the northeast of Benton.
- Penn Yan – a small part of the Village of Penn Yan is in the south part of the town on NY-14A.
