= Thomas Bitley House =

Historic house in New York, United States

- U.S. National Register of Historic Places
- Location within New York Location within the United States
- Location: Lake St., Jerusalem, New York
- Coordinates: 42°35′33″N 77°9′10″W
- Area: 1.4 acres (0.57 ha)
- Built: 1855
- Architectural style: Italianate
- MPS: Yates County MPS
- NRHP reference No.: 94000928
- Added to NRHP: August 24, 1994

The Thomas Bitley House is a historic house located at Jerusalem in Yates County, New York.

== Description and history ==
It is an Italianate-style dwelling built in about 1855.

It was listed on the National Register of Historic Places on August 24, 1994.
