= Jemima Wilkinson House =

Historic house in New York, US

- U.S. National Register of Historic Places
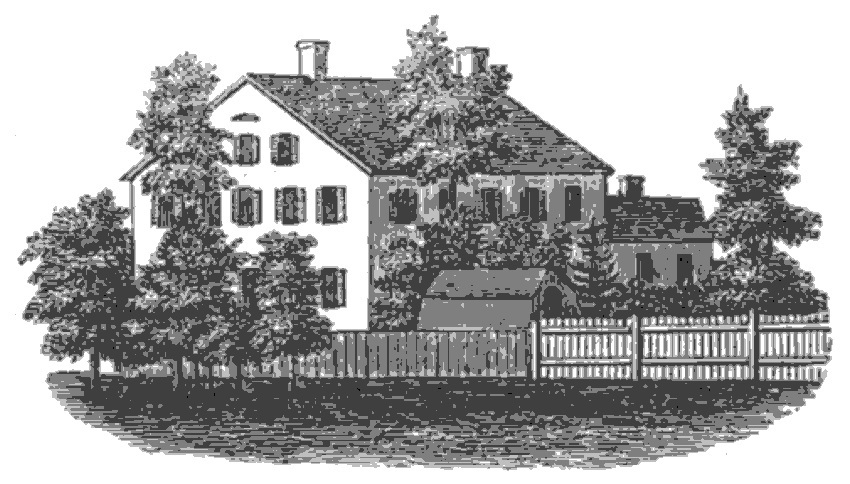
- South view of the Friend's Home (engraving from 1842).

- Location within New York Location within the United States
- Location: 3912 Friend Hill Rd., Jerusalem, New York
- Coordinates: 42°39′24″N 77°9′55″W
- Area: 127.3 acres (51.5 ha)
- Built: c. 1809–1815
- Architect: Clark, Thomas
- Architectural style: Federal
- MPS: Yates County MPS
- NRHP reference No.: 94000965
- Added to NRHP: August 24, 1994

The Jemima Wilkinson House, also known as the Friend's Home, is a historic home located at Jerusalem in Yates County, New York. It is a five-bay, 2 1/2-story Federal-style residence built about 1809–1815.

It was the home of Jemima Wilkinson, also known as the Public Universal Friend, and base of the Society of Universal Friends.

It was listed on the National Register of Historic Places in 1994.
