= Samuel Botsford House =

Historic house in New York, United States

- U.S. National Register of Historic Places
- Location within New York Location within the United States
- Location: County House Rd., Jerusalem, New York
- Coordinates: 42°37′46″N 77°9′41″W
- Area: 54.5 acres (22.1 ha)
- Built: 1868
- Architectural style: Italianate
- MPS: Yates County MPS
- NRHP reference No.: 94000929
- Added to NRHP: August 24, 1994

The Samuel Botsford House is a historic house located on County House Road in Jerusalem, Yates County, New York.

== Description and history ==
It is an Italianate style dwelling built in about 1868. It is constructed of rubble stone with applied wooden ornaments.

It was listed on the National Register of Historic Places on August 24, 1994.
