= William Nichols Cobblestone Farmhouse =

Historic house in New York, United States

- U.S. National Register of Historic Places
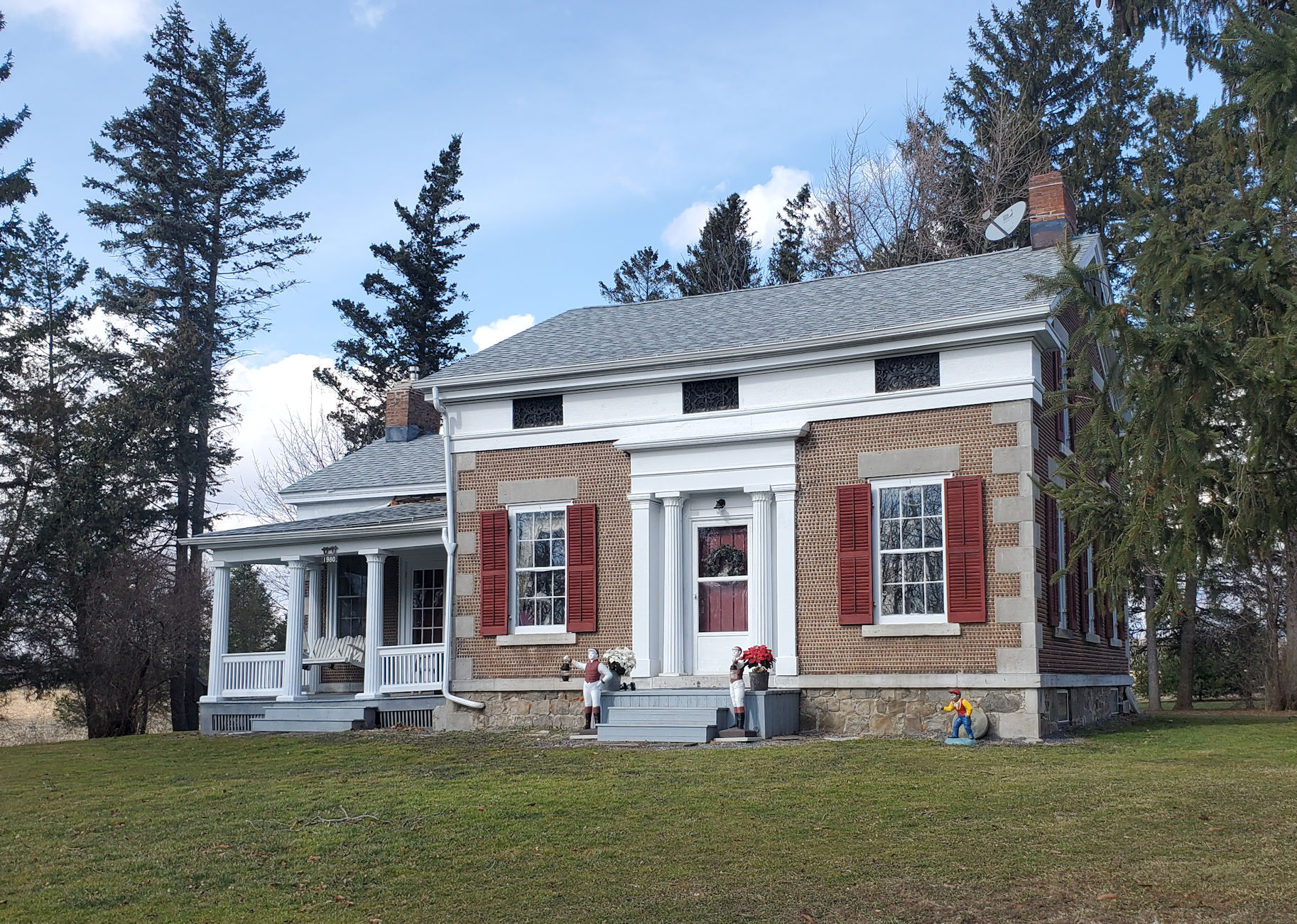

- Location within New York Location within the United States
- Location: Alexander Rd. W of jct. with Thistle St. Rd., Benton, New York
- Coordinates: 42°45′33″N 77°2′21″W
- Area: 69.4 acres (28.1 ha)
- Built: 1844
- Architectural style: Greek Revival
- MPS: Cobblestone Architecture of New York State MPS
- NRHP reference No.: 92000437
- Added to NRHP: May 11, 1992

William Nichols Cobblestone Farmhouse is a historic home located at Benton in Yates County, New York. The farmhouse was built about 1844 and is an example of Greek Revival style, cobblestone domestic architecture. It is a 1 1/2-story, L-shaped residence. It is built of reddish lakewashed cobbles. The property includes a barn and smokehouse. The farmhouse is among the nine surviving cobblestone buildings in Yates County.

It was listed on the National Register of Historic Places in 1992.
