= Sill Tenant House =

Historic house in New York, United States

- U.S. National Register of Historic Places
- Location within New York Location within the United States
- Location: 3232 Co. Rt. 54, Jerusalem, New York
- Coordinates: 42°36′8″N 77°7′18″W
- Area: 6.2 acres (2.5 ha)
- Built: 1870
- MPS: Yates County MPS
- NRHP reference No.: 94000952
- Added to NRHP: August 24, 1994

Sill Tenant House is a historic home located at Jerusalem in Yates County, New York. It is a structure built about 1870.

It was listed on the National Register of Historic Places in 1994.
