= Public Universal Friend =

American preacher (1752–1819)

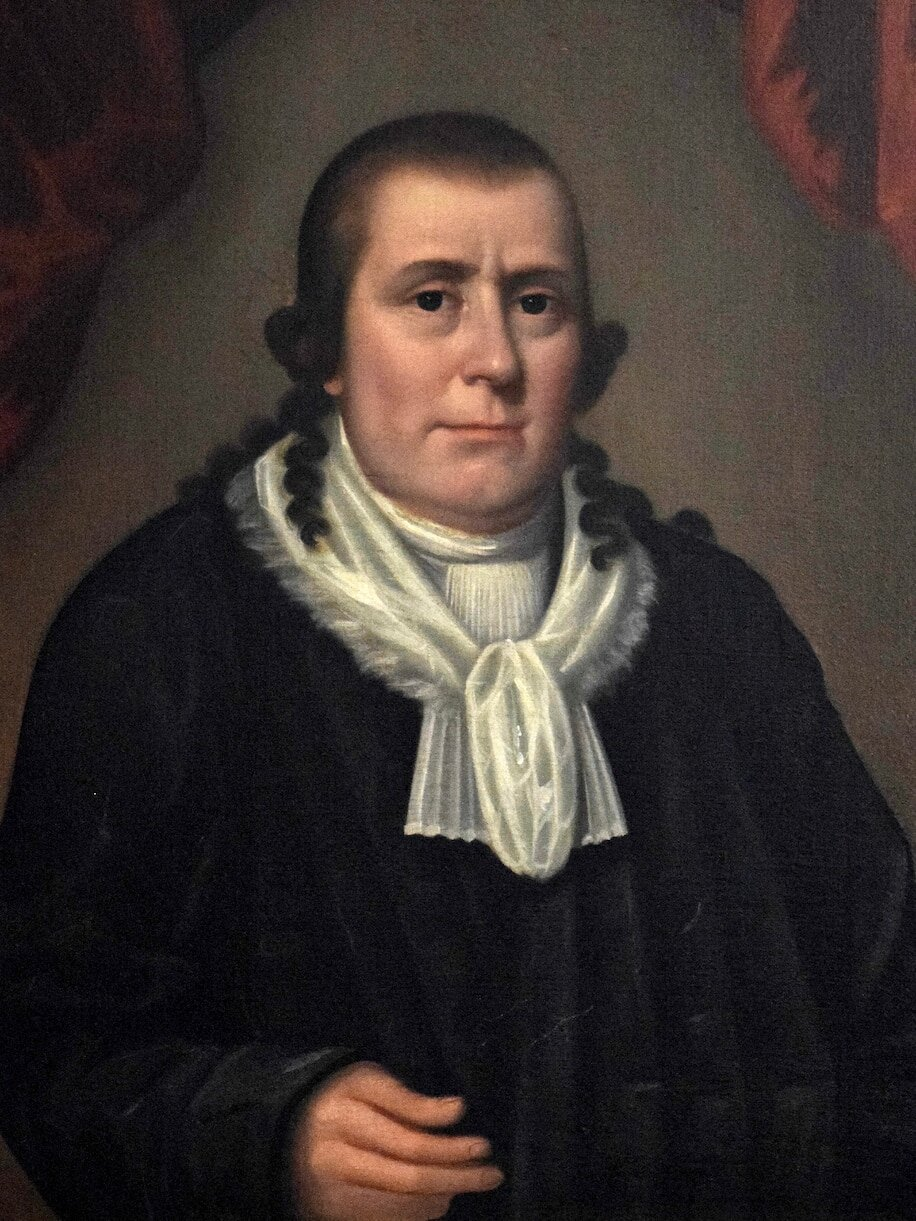
- Portrait by J.L.D. Mathies, 1816
- Born: Jemima Wilkinson; November 29, 1752; Cumberland, Colony of Rhode Island and Providence Plantations
- Died: July 1, 1819 (aged 66); Jerusalem, New York, U.S.
- Other name: Shinnewawna gis tau ge
- Occupation: Preacher

The Public Universal Friend (Note: Original spelling: the Publick Universal Friend. Shortened forms: the Universal Friend, the Friend, or P.U.F. References to the Friend tend to avoid any pronouns altogether, instead using "the Friend".) (born Jemima Wilkinson; November 29, 1752 – July 1, 1819; also known by the Haudenosaunee name Shinnewawna gis tau ge) was an American preacher born in Cumberland, Rhode Island, to Quaker parents. After suffering a severe illness in 1776, the Friend claimed to have died and been reanimated as a genderless evangelist named the Public Universal Friend, and afterward shunned both birth name and all pronouns. In androgynous clothes, the Friend preached throughout the northeastern United States, attracting many followers who became the Society of Universal Friends.

The Friend's theology was broadly similar to that of most Quakers. The Friend stressed free will, opposed slavery, and supported sexual abstinence. The most committed members of the Society of Universal Friends were a group of unmarried women who took leading roles in their households and community. In the 1790s, members of the Society acquired land in Western New York where they formed the town of Jerusalem near Penn Yan, New York. The Society of Universal Friends ceased to exist by the 1860s. Some writers have portrayed the Friend as a woman, and either a manipulative fraudster or a pioneer for women's rights, while others, such as scholar Scott Larson, have viewed the Friend as transgender or non-binary and a figure in trans history.

== Early life ==
Jemima Wilkinson, who would later become the Public Universal Friend, was born on November 29, 1752, in Cumberland, Rhode Island, as the eighth child of Amy (or Amey, née Whipple) and Jeremiah Wilkinson, (Note: Some older texts use the spelling Jemimah Wilkinson, see e.g. those quoted by Moyer, p. 101 and pp. 106–108 or Wisbey, p. 93.) becoming the fourth generation of the family to live in America. Assigned female at birth, the child was named after Jemima, one of the biblical Job's daughters. Wilkinson's great-grandfather, Lawrence Wilkinson, was an officer in the army of Charles I who had emigrated from England around 1650 and was active in colonial government. Jeremiah Wilkinson was a cousin of Stephen Hopkins, the colony's longtime governor and signer of the Declaration of Independence. Jeremiah attended traditional worship with the Society of Friends (the Quakers) at the Smithfield Meeting House. Early biographer David Hudson says that Amy was also a member of the Society for many years, while later biographer Herbert Wisbey finds no evidence of that, but quotes Moses Brown as saying the child was "born such" because of Jeremiah's affiliation. Amy died when Wilkinson was 12 or 13 in 1764, shortly after giving birth to a twelfth child.

Wilkinson had fine black hair and dark eyes, and from an early age was strong and athletic, becoming an adept equestrian as a child, remaining so in adulthood, and liking spirited horses and ensuring that animals received good care. An avid reader, (Note: The Friend had friends hold realty in trust rather than see the name on deeds and titles. Even when a lawyer insisted that the Friend's will identify its subject as "the person who before the year one thousand seven hundred & seventy seven was known & called by the name of Jemima Wilkinson but since that time as the Universal Friend", the preacher refused to sign that name, only making an X which others witnessed. This led some writers to mistakenly think that the evangelist could not read or write.) Wilkinson could quote long passages of the Bible and prominent Quaker texts from memory. Little else is reliably known about Wilkinson's childhood; some early accounts such as Hudson's describe Wilkinson as being fond of fine clothes and averse to labor, but there is no contemporaneous evidence of this and Wisbey considers it doubtful. Biographer Paul Moyer says it may have been invented to fit a then-common narrative that people who experienced dramatic religious awakenings were formerly profligate sinners.

In the mid-1770s, Wilkinson began attending meetings in Cumberland with New Light Baptists who had formed as part of the Great Awakening and emphasized individual enlightenment, and stopped attending meetings of the Society of Friends – being disciplined for that in February 1776 and disowned by the Smithfield Meeting in August. Wilkinson's sister Patience was dismissed at the same time for having an illegitimate child; brothers Stephen and Jeptha had been dismissed by the pacifistic Society in May 1776 for training for military service. Amid these family disturbances and the broader ones of the American Revolutionary War, dissatisfied with the New Light Baptists and shunned by mainstream Quakers, Wilkinson faced much stress in 1776.

== Becoming the Public Universal Friend ==
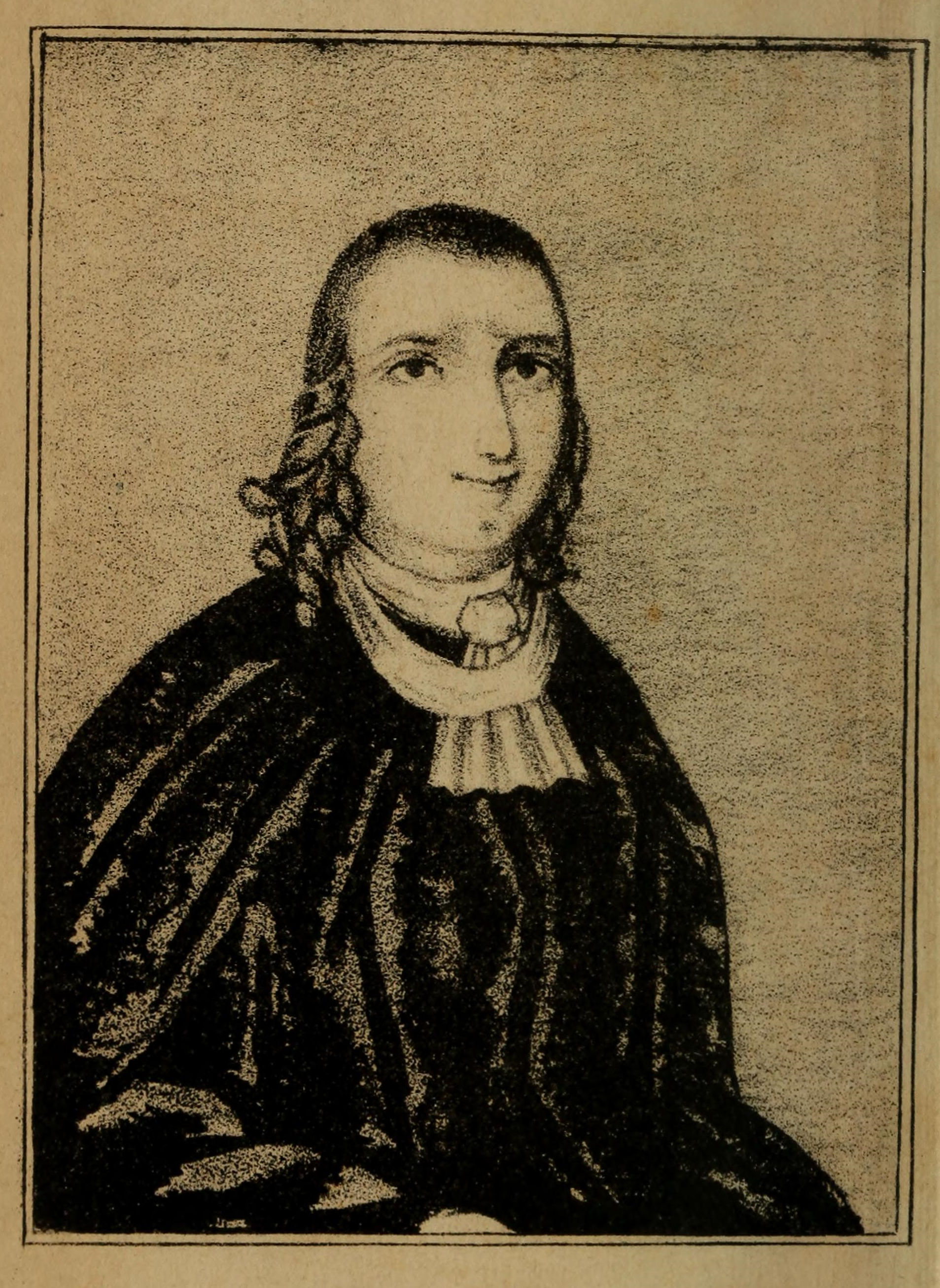
Portrait from David Hudson's 1821 biography

In October 1776, Wilkinson contracted an epidemic disease, most likely typhus, and was bedridden and near death with a high fever. The future preacher's family summoned a doctor from Attleboro, six miles away, and neighbors kept up a death-watch at night. The fever broke after several days. The Friend later reported that Wilkinson had died, receiving revelations from God through two archangels who proclaimed there was "Room, Room, Room, in the many Mansions of eternal glory for Thee and for everyone". (Note: Wisbey (p. 12) notes that a brother recalled the Friend saying "There is Room Enough" at the time of the illness.) Accounts by the doctor and other witnesses state that the illness was real, but none of them say that Wilkinson died. The Friend further said that Wilkinson's soul had ascended to heaven and the body had been reanimated with a new spirit charged by God with preaching his word, that of the "Publick Universal Friend", describing that name in the words of Isaiah 62:2 as "a new name which the mouth of the Lord hath named". The name referenced the designation the Society of Friends used for members who traveled from community to community to preach, "Public Friends".

From that time on, the Friend refused to answer to the name "Jemima Wilkinson", ignoring or chastising those who insisted on using it. Hudson says that when visitors asked if it was the name of the person they were addressing, the Friend simply quoted Luke 23:3 ("thou sayest it"). Identifying as neither male nor female, the Friend asked not to be referred to with gendered pronouns. Followers respected these wishes; they referred only to "the Public Universal Friend" or short forms such as "the Friend" or "P.U.F.", and many avoided gender-specific pronouns even in private diaries, while others used he. When someone asked if the Friend was male or female, the preacher replied "I am that I am", saying the same thing to a man who criticized the Friend's manner of dress (adding, in the latter case, "there is nothing indecent or improper in my dress or appearance; I am not accountable to mortals").

The Friend dressed in a manner perceived to be either androgynous or masculine, in long, loose clerical robes which were most often black, and wore a white or purple kerchief or cravat around the neck like men of the time. The preacher did not wear a hair-cap indoors, like women of the era, and outdoors wore broad-brimmed, low-crowned beaver hats of a style worn by Quaker men. Accounts of the Friend's "feminine-masculine tone of voice" varied; some hearers described it as "clear and harmonious", or said the preacher spoke "with ease and facility", "clearly, though without elegance". Others described it as "grum and shrill", or like a "kind of croak, unearthly and sepulchral". The Friend was said to move easily, freely, and modestly, and was described by Ezra Stiles as "decent & graceful & grave".

== Beliefs, preaching, and the Society of Universal Friends ==
The "Seal of the Universal Friend"

The Friend began to travel and preach throughout Rhode Island, Connecticut, Massachusetts, and Pennsylvania accompanied by brother Stephen and sisters Deborah, Elizabeth, Marcy, (Note: Marcy's name is spelled Mercy in some records.) and Patience, all of whom were disowned by the Society of Friends. Early on, the Public Universal Friend preached that people needed to repent of their sins and be saved before an imminent Day of Judgment. According to Abner Brownell, the preacher predicted that the fulfillment of some prophecies of Revelation would begin around April 1780, 42 months after the Universal Friend began preaching, and interpreted New England's Dark Day in May 1780 as fulfillment of that prediction. According to a Philadelphia newspaper, later followers Sarah Richards (also known as Sarah Friend) and James Parker believed themselves to be the two witnesses mentioned in Revelation and accordingly wore sackcloth for a time.

The Friend did not bring a Bible to worship meetings, which were initially held outdoors or in borrowed meeting houses, but preached long sections of the scriptures from memory. The meetings attracted large audiences, including some who formed a congregation of "Universal Friends", making the Friend the first native-born American citizen to found a religious community. These followers included roughly equal numbers of women and men who were predominantly under 40. Most were from Quaker backgrounds, though mainstream Quakers discouraged and disciplined members for attending meetings with the Friend. Indeed, the Society of Friends had disowned the Friend, disapproving of what William Savery considered "pride and ambition to distinguish [them]self from the rest of mankind". Free Quakers, disowned by the main Society of Friends for participating in the American War of Independence, were particularly sympathetic and opened meeting houses to the Universal Friends, appreciating that many of them had also sympathized with the Patriot cause, including members of the Friend's family.

Popular newspapers and pamphlets covered the Friend's sermons in detail by the mid-1780s, with several Philadelphia newspapers being particularly critical; they fomented enough opposition that noisy crowds gathered outside each place the preacher stayed or spoke in 1788. Most papers focused more on the preacher's ambiguous gender than on theology, which was broadly similar to the teachings of most Quakers; one person who heard the Friend in 1788 said "from common report I expected to hear something out of the way in doctrine, which is not the case, in fact [I] heard nothing but what is common among preachers" in mainstream Quaker churches. The Friend's theology was so similar to that of the mainstream Quakers' that one of two published works associated with the preacher was a plagiarism of Isaac Penington's Works because, according to Abner Brownell, the Friend felt that the sentiments would have more resonance if republished in the name of the Universal Friend. The Universal Friends also used language similar to that of the Society of Friends, using thee and thou instead of the more formal singular you.

The Public Universal Friend rejected the ideas of predestination and election, held that anyone, regardless of gender, could gain access to God's light and that God spoke directly to individuals who had free will to choose how to act and believe, and believed in the possibility of universal salvation. Calling for the abolition of slavery, the Friend persuaded followers who held people in slavery to free them. Several members of the congregation of Universal Friends were black, and they acted as witnesses for manumission papers. The Friend preached humility and hospitality towards everyone; kept religious meetings open to the public, and housed and fed visitors, including those who came only out of curiosity and indigenous people, with whom the preacher generally had a cordial relationship. The Friend had few personal possessions, given mainly by followers, and never held any real property except in trust.

The Friend preached sexual abstinence and disfavored marriage but did not see celibacy as mandatory and accepted marriage, especially as preferable to breaking abstinence outside of wedlock. Most followers did marry, but the portion who did not was significantly above the national average of the time. The preacher also held that women should "obey God rather than men", and the most committed followers included roughly four dozen unmarried women known as the Faithful Sisterhood who took on leading roles of the sort which were often reserved to men. The portion of households headed by women in the Society's settlements (20%) was much higher than in surrounding areas.

Around 1785, the Friend met Sarah and Abraham Richards. The Richards' unhappy marriage ended in 1786 when Abraham died on a visit to the Friend. Sarah and her infant daughter took up residence with the Friend, adopted a similarly androgynous hairstyle, dress, and mannerisms (as did a few other close female friends), and came to be called Sarah Friend. The Friend entrusted Sarah with holding the society's property in trust, and sent her to preach in one part of the country when the Friend was in another. Sarah had a large part in planning and building the house in which she and the preacher lived in the town of Jerusalem, and when she died in 1793, she left her child to the Friend's care.

In October 1794, the Friend and several followers dined with Thomas Morris (son of financier Robert Morris) in Canandaigua at the invitation of Timothy Pickering, and accompanied him to talks with the Haudenosaunee aimed at producing the Treaty of Canandaigua. With Pickering's permission and an interpreter, the Friend gave a speech to the US government officials and Haudenosaunee chiefs about "the Importance of Peace & Love", which was liked by the Haudenosaunee. The Haudenosaunee chiefs present gave the Friend the name "Shinnewawna gis tau ge", translating to "A Great Woman Preacher".

== Settlement of the Gore and Jerusalem, and legal issues ==
In the mid-1780s, the Universal Friends began to plan a town for themselves in western New York. By late 1788, vanguard members of the Society had established a settlement in the Genesee River area; by March 1790, it was ready enough that the rest of the Universal Friends set out to join it, making it the largest non-Native community in western New York. However, problems arose. James Parker spent three weeks in 1791 petitioning the governor and land office of New York on behalf of the Society to get a title to the land that the Friends had settled, but while most of the buildings and other improvements that the Universal Friends made were to the east of the initial Preemption Line and thus in New York, when the line was resurveyed in 1792 at least 25 homes and farms were now west of it, outside the area granted by New York, and residents were forced to repurchase their lands from the Pulteney Association. The town, which had been known as the Friend's Settlement, therefore came to be called The Gore.

Furthermore, the lands were in the tract on which Phelps and Gorham defaulted which was resold to financier Robert Morris and then to the Pulteney Association, absentee British speculators. Each change of hands drove prices higher, as did an influx of new settlers attracted by the Society's improvements to the area. The community lacked a solid title to enough land for all its members, and some left. Others wanted to profit by taking ownership of the land for themselves, including Parker and William Potter. To address the first of these issues, members of the Society of Universal Friends had secured some alternative sites. Abraham Dayton acquired a large area of land in Canada from Governor John Graves Simcoe, though Sarah Richards persuaded the Friend not to move so far. Separately, Thomas Hathaway and Benedict Robinson had purchased a site in 1789 along a creek which they named Brook Kedron that emptied into the Crooked Lake (Keuka Lake). The new town which the Universal Friends began there came to be called Jerusalem.

The second issue, however, came to a head in the fall of 1799. Judge William Potter, Ontario County magistrate James Parker, and several disillusioned former followers led several attempts to arrest the Friend for blasphemy, which some writers argue was motivated by disagreements over land ownership and power. An officer tried to seize the Friend while riding with Rachel Malin in the Gore, but the Friend, a skilled horse-rider, escaped. The officer and an assistant later tried to arrest the preacher at home in Jerusalem, but the women of the house drove the men off and tore their clothes. A third attempt was carefully planned by a posse of 30 men who surrounded the home after midnight, broke down the door with an ax, and intended to carry the preacher off in an oxcart. A doctor who had come with the posse stated that the Friend was in too poor a state of health to be moved, and they made a deal that the Friend would appear before an Ontario county court in June 1800, but not before Justice Parker. When the Friend appeared before the court, it ruled that no indictable offense had been committed, and invited the preacher to give a sermon to those in attendance.

== Death and legacy ==
The Public Universal Friend's health had been declining since the turn of the century; by 1816, the preacher had begun to suffer from a painful edema but continued to receive visitors and give sermons. The Friend gave a final regular sermon in November 1818 and preached for the last time at the funeral of sister Patience Wilkinson Potter in April 1819.

The Friend died on July 1, 1819; the congregation's death book records "25 minutes past 2 on the Clock, The Friend went from here." In accordance with the Friend's wishes, only a regular meeting and no funeral service was held afterwards. The body was placed in a coffin with an oval glass window set into its top and interred four days after death in a thick stone vault in the cellar of the Friend's house. Several years later, the coffin was removed and buried in an unmarked grave in accordance with the preacher's preference. Obituaries appeared in papers throughout the eastern United States. Close followers remained faithful, but they too died over time; the congregation's numbers dwindled due to their inability to attract new converts amid a number of legal and religious disagreements. The Society of Universal Friends disappeared by the 1860s.

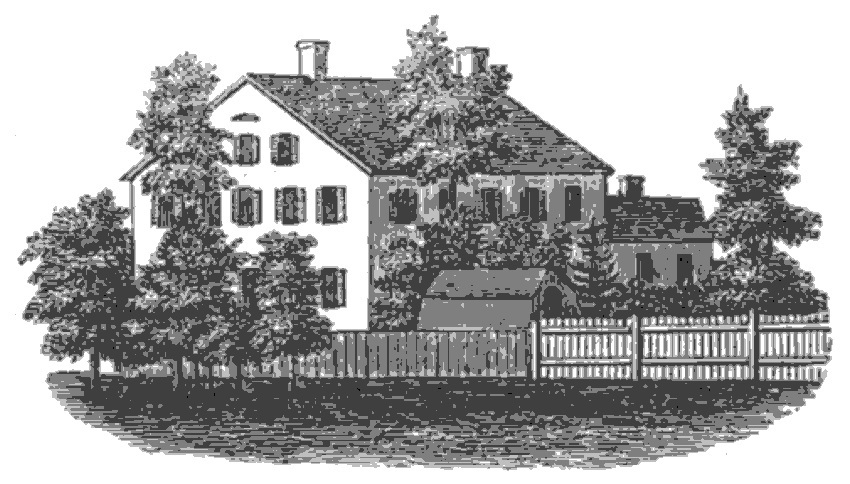
South view of the Friend's Home (engraving from 1842)

The Friend's Home and temporary burial chamber stands in the town of Jerusalem, and it is included on the National Register of Historic Places. It is believed to be located on the same branch of Keuka Lake as the birthplace of Seneca chief Red Jacket, but his birthplace is disputed. The Yates County Genealogical and Historical Society's museums in Penn Yan exhibit the Friend's portrait, Bible, carriage, hat, saddle, and documents from the Society of Universal Friends. As late as the 1900s, inhabitants of Little Rest, Rhode Island, called a species of solidago Jemima weed because its appearance in the town coincided with the preacher's first visit to the area in the 1770s.

The Friend and followers were pioneers of the area between Seneca and Keuka lakes. The Society of Universal Friends erected a grain mill in Dresden.

== Interpretations and legends ==
Although the Public Universal Friend identified as genderless, neither a man nor a woman, many writers have portrayed the preacher as a woman, and either a fraudulent schemer who deceived and manipulated followers or a pioneering leader who founded several towns in which women were empowered to take on roles often reserved to men. The first view was taken by many writers in the 18th and 19th centuries, including David Hudson, whose hostile and inaccurate biography (written to influence a court case over the Society's land) was long influential. These writers circulated myths of the Friend despotically bossing followers around or banishing them for years, making married followers divorce, taking their property, or even attempting and failing to raise the dead or walk on water; there is no contemporaneous evidence for these stories, and people who knew the Friend, including some who were never followers, said the rumors were false.

Another story began at a 1787 meeting, after which Sarah Wilson said Abigail Dayton tried to strangle Wilson while she slept but choked her bedmate Anna Steyers by mistake. Steyers denied anything had happened, and others present attributed Wilson's fears to a nightmare. Nevertheless, Philadelphia papers printed an embellished version of the accusation and several follow-ups, with critics alleging the attack must have had the Friend's approval, and the story eventually morphing into one in which the Friend (who was in a different state at the time) strangled Wilson. One widespread allegation which sparked much hostility was the accusation that the preacher claimed to be Jesus; the Friend and the Universal Friends repeatedly denied this accusation.

Modern writers have often portrayed the Friend as a pioneer, an early figure in the history of women's rights (a view taken by Susan Juster and Catherine Brekus) or in transgender history (a view explored by Scott Larson and Rachel Hope Cleves). Historian Michael Bronski says that the Friend would not have been called transgender or transvestite "by the standards and the vocabulary" of the time, but has called the Friend a "transgender evangelist". Juster calls the Friend a "spiritual transvestite", and says that followers considered the Friend's androgynous clothing congruent with the genderless spirit which they believed animated the preacher.

Juster and others state that, to followers, the Friend may have embodied Paul's statement in Galatians 3:28 that "there is neither male nor female" in Christ. Catherine Wessinger, Brekus, and others state that the Friend defied the idea of gender as binary and as natural and essential or innate, though Brekus and Juster argue that the Friend nonetheless reinforced views of male superiority by "dressing like a man" and repeatedly insisting on not being a woman. Scott Larson, disagreeing with narratives that place the Public Universal Friend into the gender binary as a woman, writes that the Friend can be understood as a chapter in trans history "before 'transgender'". Bronski cites the Friend as a rare instance of an early American publicly identifying as non-binary.

T. Fleischmann's 2019 essay "Time Is the Thing a Body Moves Through" examines the Friend's narrative with an eye to the colonizing nature of evangelism in the US, viewing it as "a way to think through the limitations of imagination as a white settler".

== See also ==
- Mother Ann Lee, contemporary leader of another new religious movement, the Shakers
- Jennie June, transgender person also born to a religious family in New England
