= Arnold Potter House =

Historic house in New York, United States

- U.S. National Register of Historic Places
- Location within New York Location within the United States
- Location: 1445 Voak Rd., Potter, New York
- Coordinates: 42°41′22″N 77°7′44″W
- Area: 138.5 acres (56.0 ha)
- Built: c. 1790
- Architect: Jordon, Robert; Warner and Clark
- Architectural style: Georgian
- MPS: Yates County MPS
- NRHP reference No.: 94000950
- Added to NRHP: August 24, 1994

The Arnold Potter House (also known as Potter Mansion) is a historic house located at 1445 Voak Road in Potter, Yates County, New York.

== Description and history ==
It is a massive five-by-five-bay, two-story home built in about 1790 in the Georgian style. It was built by Robert Jordon and also Nathan Warner, an early settler of Nettle Valley & (---) Clark.

It was listed on the National Register of Historic Places on August 24, 1994.
