= Angus Cobblestone Farmhouse and Barn Complex =

Historic house in New York, United States

- U.S. National Register of Historic Places
- Location within New York Location within the United States
- Location: 612 NY 14, Benton, New York
- Coordinates: 42°44′3″N 76°58′29″W
- Area: 62.2 acres (25.2 ha)
- Built: 1831
- Architectural style: Greek Revival
- MPS: Cobblestone Architecture of New York State MPS
- NRHP reference No.: 92000439
- Added to NRHP: May 11, 1992

Angus Cobblestone Farmhouse and Barn Complex is a historic home and barn located at Benton in Yates County, New York. The complex consists of the farmhouse, was constructed about 1831–1834, and three contributing outbuildings. The farmhouse is an example of vernacular Greek Revival style, cobblestone domestic architecture. The exterior walls are built of variously shaped and colored field cobbles. Also on the property are two large frame barns and a small shed. The farmhouse is among the nine surviving cobblestone buildings in Yates County.

It was listed on the National Register of Historic Places in 1992.
