= Whitaker House (Benton, New York) =

Historic house in New York, United States

- U.S. National Register of Historic Places
- Location within New York Location within the United States
- Location: Benton-Torrey Town Line Rd., Benton, New York
- Coordinates: 42°42′16″N 77°1′3″W
- Area: less than one acre
- Built: 1850
- Architectural style: Late Gothic Revival
- MPS: Yates County MPS
- NRHP reference No.: 94000964
- Added to NRHP: August 24, 1994

Whitaker House is a historic home located at Benton in Yates County, New York. It is a Late Gothic Revival style structure built about 1850.

It was listed on the National Register of Historic Places in 1994.
