= Branchport, New York =

Branchport
- hamlet
- Location within the state of New York
- Coordinates: 42°35′54″N 77°09′14″W
- Country: United States
- State: New York
- County: Yates
- Town: Jerusalem
- Elevation: 741 ft (226 m)
- Time zone: UTC-5 (Eastern (EST))
  - Summer (DST): UTC-4 (EDT)
- ZIP code: 14418
- Area code: 315

Branchport is a hamlet in the town of Jerusalem in Yates County, New York, United States. It is a "crossroads community" which contains about 85 dwellings, six stores, two churches, a library and a firehouse.

The name "Branchport" comes from its location at the north end of the west branch of the Y-shaped Keuka Lake. Keuka is one of the Finger Lakes, a series of long slender lakes located in Western Central New York State.

== History ==
Branchport lies within the Beddoe Tract of the Phelps and Gorham Purchase. The area immediately north of Branchport was first settled circa 1791 by followers of the Public Universal Friend, a charismatic American evangelist, who called the area "The New Jerusalem".

In 1831, the first store was built at the crossroads, and the community of Branchport (Originally called Esperanza, meaning "hope") grew around this store. In 1867, Branchport became an incorporated village, but has since dissolved the village government, relinquishing its incorporated status.

Branchport became an important port for steamboats which plied the waters of Keuka Lake carrying both passengers and produce from 1835 to 1922. It was also the western terminus of the Penn Yan, Keuka Park and Branchport railway, an 8 1/2-mile electric trolley which provided passenger and freight car service from 1913 to 1928. The line connected with the Northern Central Railroad at Penn Yan.

In the past, Branchport was the seat of small industry including a basket factory, foundry, spoke factory, planing mill, and harness shop. As transportation became more available and industry became concentrated in larger towns, Branchport became largely a residential community, but continues to serve an area of summer lake residents and tourists, as well as farmers who are mainly involved in the growing of grapes.

== Area points of interest ==
- Keuka College — three miles east of Branchport. An independent, four-year, residential, coeducational college.
- Keuka Lake State Park — one mile east of Branchport. A full feature park, offering swimming, picnic tables with pavilions, a playground, hiking, hunting and fishing, cross-country skiing and snowmobiling, a boat launch and a campground with tent and trailer sites.
- The Keuka Lake Winery Tour — a self conducted tour of Keuka Lake area wineries goes through Branchport. Hunt Country Vineyards is a stop along the tour.
- Stone Schoolhouse — built in 1868 as a two-room school for the Branchport area. It now houses the offices of the town of Jerusalem and contains historical displays and records which are open to the public.
- Verdi Burtch Bird Refuge — at the Eastern edge of Branchport along Sugar Creek. A marshland with an observation platform overlooking the marsh and Keuka Lake. Also available is a public fishing area and a boat launch.
- The Larzelere Tavern, Solomon Weaver House, Myron Weaver House, and Dr. James Wrightman House are listed on the National Register of Historic Places.

== Notes ==
- Stafford C. Cleveland (1873) "History of Yates County, New York"
- Lewis Cass Aldrich (1892) "History of Yates County N.Y."
- Miles A. Davis, (1912) "History of Jerusalem"
- William Reed Gordan (1967) "Keuka Lake Memories"
