= Dr. James Wrightman House =

Historic house in New York, United States

- U.S. National Register of Historic Places
- Location within New York Location within the United States
- Location: 48 W. Lake Rd., Branchport, New York
- Coordinates: 42°35′28″N 77°9′4″W
- Area: less than one acre
- Built: 1870
- Architectural style: Queen Anne, Stick/Eastlake
- MPS: Yates County MPS
- NRHP reference No.: 94000970
- Added to NRHP: August 24, 1994

Dr. James Wrightman House is a historic home located at Branchport in Yates County, New York. It is a Queen Anne style structure built about 1870.

It was listed on the National Register of Historic Places in 1994.
