= Peter Bitley House =

Historic house in New York, United States

- U.S. National Register of Historic Places
- Location within New York Location within the United States
- Location: W. Lake Rd. (Co. Rt. 54A), Jerusalem, New York
- Coordinates: 42°35′32″N 77°9′11″W
- Area: 2 acres (0.81 ha)
- Built: 1837
- Architectural style: Greek Revival
- MPS: Yates County MPS
- NRHP reference No.: 94000927
- Added to NRHP: August 24, 1994

Peter Bitley House is a historic home located at Jerusalem in Yates County, New York. It is a Greek Revival style structure built about 1837.

It was listed on the National Register of Historic Places in 1994.
