= Barden Cobblestone Farmhouse =

Historic house in New York, United States

- U.S. National Register of Historic Places
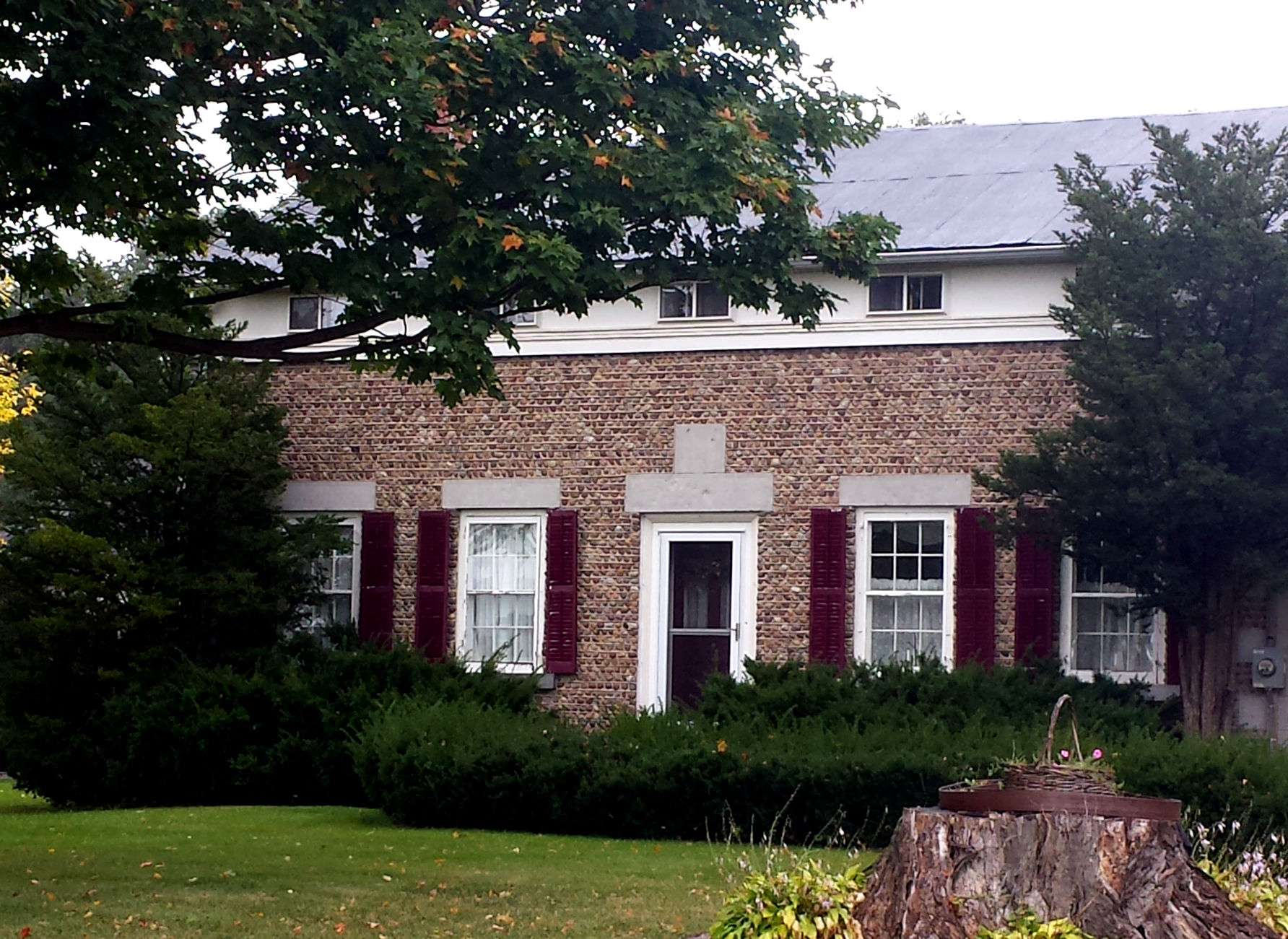

- Location within New York Location within the United States
- Location: 2492 Ferguson Corners Rd., Benton, New York
- Coordinates: 42°45′16″N 77°4′26″W
- Area: 4.3 acres (1.7 ha)
- Built: 1843
- Architectural style: Greek Revival
- MPS: Cobblestone Architecture of New York State MPS
- NRHP reference No.: 92000435
- Added to NRHP: May 11, 1992

Barden Cobblestone Farmhouse is a historic home located at Benton in Yates County, New York. The farmhouse was built about 1843 and is an example of vernacular Greek Revival style, cobblestone domestic architecture. It is a 1 1/2-story, five-bay center-hall building. It is built of small, multi-colored field cobbles. Also on the property are two sheds, two wells, and a hitching post. The farmhouse is among the nine surviving cobblestone buildings in Yates County.

It was listed on the National Register of Historic Places in 1992.
