= Jephtha Earl Cobblestone Farmhouse =

Historic house in New York, United States

- U.S. National Register of Historic Places
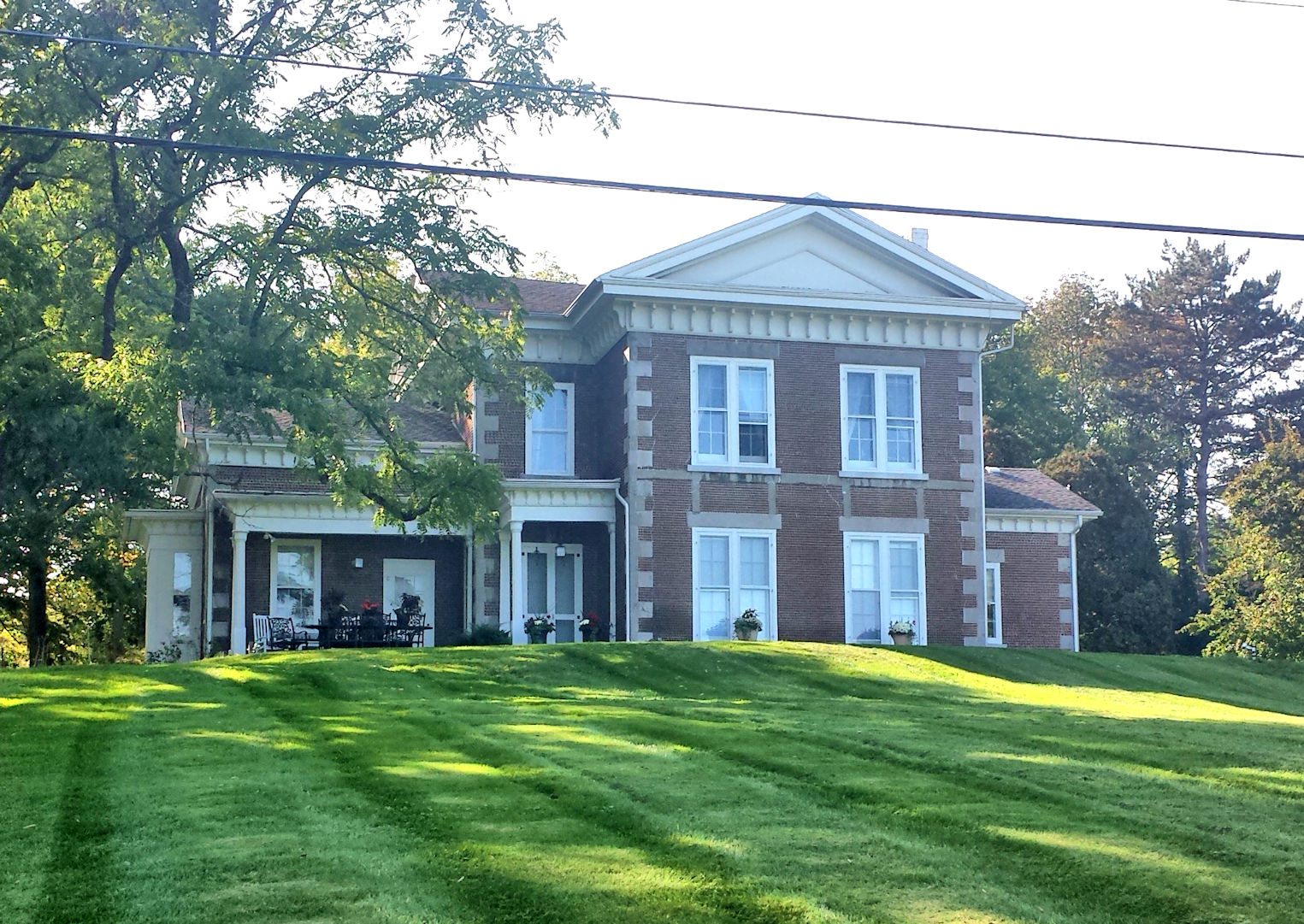

- Location within New York Location within the United States
- Location: Old State Rd. N of jct. with Johnson Rd., Benton, New York
- Coordinates: 42°45′27″N 76°58′42″W
- Area: 3.1 acres (1.3 ha)
- Built: ca 1850s
- Architectural style: Mid 19th Century Revival, Italianate
- MPS: Cobblestone Architecture of New York State MPS
- NRHP reference No.: 92000438
- Added to NRHP: May 11, 1992

Jephtha Earl Cobblestone Farmhouse is a historic home located at Benton in Yates County, New York. The farmhouse was built about 1850–1860 and is an example of Italianate style, cobblestone domestic architecture. The main block is a two-story, L-shaped mass with a cross-gable roof and pedimented front gable, connecting a number of wings. It is built of tiny, reddish, oval-shaped cobbles. The farmhouse is among the nine surviving cobblestone buildings in Yates County.

It was listed on the National Register of Historic Places in 1992.
