= James Fox House =

Historic house in New York, United States

- U.S. National Register of Historic Places
- Location within New York Location within the United States
- Location: 750 Italy Valley Rd., Italy, New York
- Coordinates: 42°36′22″N 77°17′54″W
- Area: 7.5 acres (3.0 ha)
- Built: 1815
- Architectural style: Federal
- MPS: Yates County MPS
- NRHP reference No.: 94000934
- Added to NRHP: August 24, 1994

James Fox House is a historic home located at Italy in Yates County, New York. It is a Federal style structure built about 1815.

It was listed on the National Register of Historic Places in 1994.
