= Esperanza (Jerusalem, New York) =

Historic house in New York, United States

- U.S. National Register of Historic Places
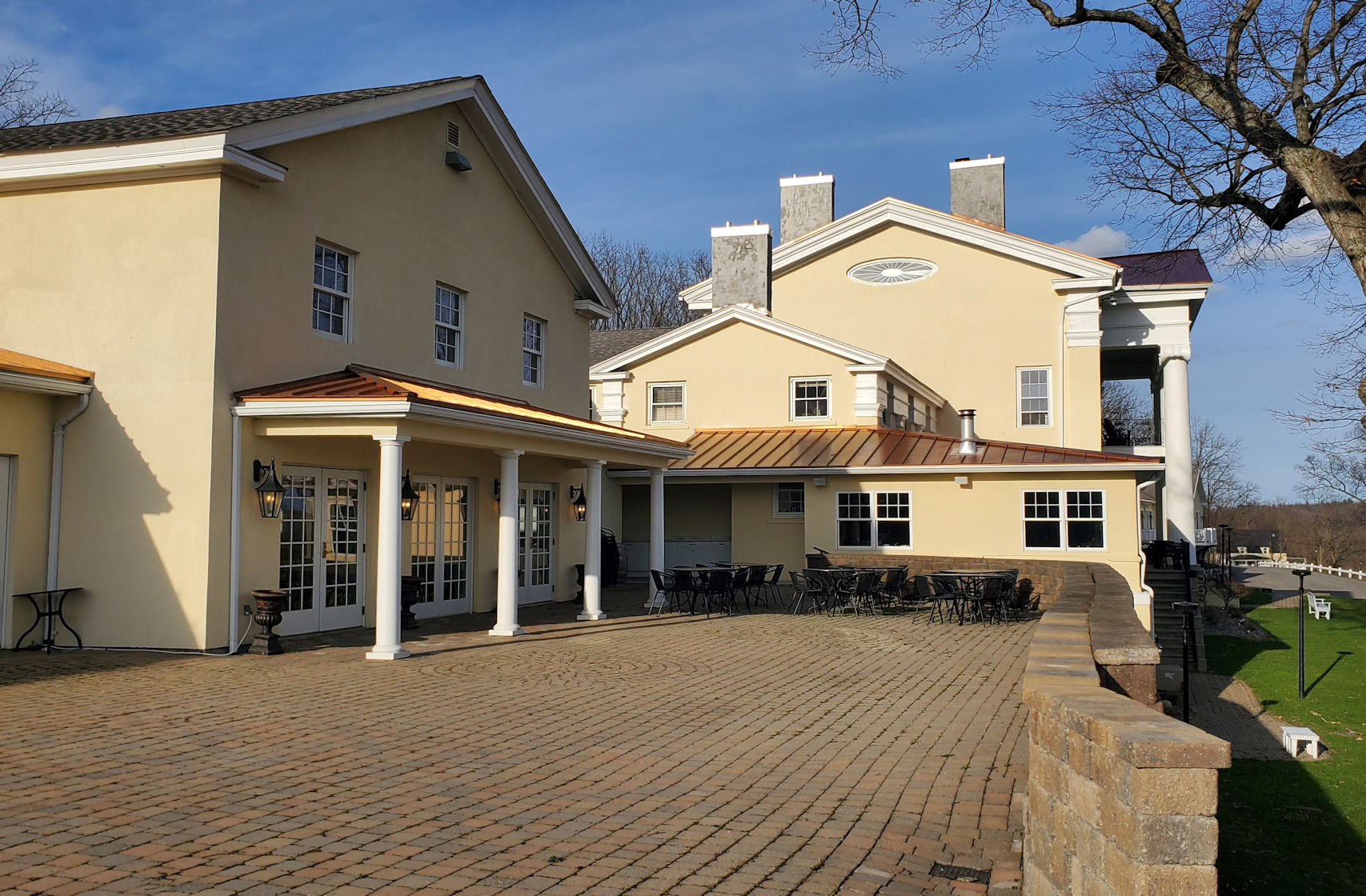

- Location within New York Location within the United States
- Location: NY 54A E of Keuka Lake, Jerusalem, New York
- Coordinates: 42°35′45″N 77°8′6″W
- Area: 5 acres (2.0 ha)
- Built: 1838
- Architectural style: Greek Revival
- MPS: Yates County MPS
- NRHP reference No.: 95001406
- Added to NRHP: December 07, 1995

Esperanza, also known as John Rose House, is a historic home located at Jerusalem in Yates County, New York. It is a Greek Revival style structure with a 2 1/2-story, side-gabled main block and a 1 1/2-story, side-gabled west wing. It was built in 1838 and features a massive 2-story portico composed of four Ionic columns supporting a full entablature and pediment. The mansion is ideally situated on Keuka Lake in Yates County, near several wineries. The Seneca Lake Wine Trail is minutes away.

The Esperanza Mansion was built by John Nicholas Rose and his wife Jane Macomb. The Rose family lived in the home until 1870. During that time, Rose became one of the wealthiest citizens in the area. The mansion changed hands several times in the subsequent years:

- 1873: Clinton Snow bought the farm from the Roses. He was a vineyardist and an authority on grape culture.
- 1903: Wendel T. Bush, a financier from New York City, purchased the mansion as his summer home. He made major renovations and changed the landscaping. His wife, Mrs. Bush, launched the Yates County Women's Suffrage campaign there in 1911.
- 1912: Clinton Struble purchased the property. He was a local man from Penn Yan.
- 1922: Yates County bought the mansion and converted it to a county home. The county installed plumbing, heating, electric lights, and fire escapes.
- 1948: The county could no longer afford to maintain the property, selling it to Garrett Bacorn. He did not inhabit it and it was vacant and severely vandalized over the next 20 years.
- 1967: Betty Bader purchased the mansion to establish a gallery for local artists. She died before restoration was complete.
- 1979: The mansion became the home of Chateau Esperanza Winery.
- 1985: A real estate developer proposed a restoration of the mansion for a hotel, in addition to several townhouses on the land uphill from the mansion. Real estate values suddenly changed, and the plans were scrapped.
- [Date not known]: Shay and Edwards purchased the property for a bed and breakfast with a restaurant, but the repairs and maintenance were too extensive.
- 2002: David and Lisa Wegman purchased the property, completely renovating it.
- 2003: After major rehabilitation, Esperanza Mansion was reopened as a 22-room inn and banquet facility.
- 2016: The facility was closed.
- 2017: Banquet workers settled a class action lawsuit alleging that customers paid mandatory service charges that were not passed onto them. That same year the mansion went into foreclosure.
- 2018: The property went up for public auction, but there were no bids.
- 2019: Purchased at bank auction and put under complete restoration.
- August 2019: Larry and Betty Mellonbacher and Todd and Mary Alexander reopened Esperanza mansion as a casual fine dining restaurant with 30 guest rooms and a banquet room with a capacity of 250 people.

It was listed on the National Register of Historic Places in 1995.
