= Myron Weaver House =

Historic house in New York, United States

- U.S. National Register of Historic Places
- Location within New York Location within the United States
- Location: 21 S. Main St., Branchport, New York
- Coordinates: 42°35′39″N 77°9′17″W
- Area: less than one acre
- Architectural style: Italianate
- MPS: Yates County MPS
- NRHP reference No.: 94000962
- Added to NRHP: August 24, 1994

Myron Weaver House is a historic home located at Branchport in Yates County, New York. It is an Italianate style structure.

It was listed on the National Register of Historic Places in 1994.
