= Jerusalem, New York =

- Town
- Location in Yates County and the state of New York.
- Coordinates: 42°37′13″N 77°8′35″W
- Country: United States
- State: New York
- County: Yates

Area
  - Total: 65.40 sq mi (169.39 km^{2})
  - Land: 58.64 sq mi (151.88 km^{2})
  - Water: 6.76 sq mi (17.51 km^{2})
- Elevation: 735 ft (224 m)

Population (2020)
  - Total: 4,405
  - Density: 75.7/sq mi (29.23/km^{2})
- Time zone: UTC-5 (Eastern (EST))
  - Summer (DST): UTC-4 (EDT)
- FIPS code: 36-38583
- GNIS feature ID: 0979107
- Website: jerusalem-ny.gov

Jerusalem is a town in Yates County, New York. The population was 4,405 at the 2020 census. The town is named after the city of Jerusalem.

The Town of Jerusalem is on the south border of the county and is southwest of Geneva, New York.

== History ==
Jerusalem was within the Phelps and Gorham Purchase. It was first settled around 1791. Among the earliest settlers were the Quaker evangelist known as the Public Universal Friend (1758–1819), and followers called the "Society of Universal Friends".

The town was an original town of the county. It was established in 1789, while still in Ontario County and became part of Yates County when the county was created in 1823. The area around Bluff Point was annexed to the town in 1814.

Jerusalem has been divided to form other towns in the county: in 1803, the Town of Benton was taken from Jerusalem. It was later divided into other towns.

Branchport is a purported birthplace of Seneca leader Red Jacket, but the location is disputed.

Located within the town are a number of properties listed on the National Register of Historic Places including: Beddoe–Rose Family Cemetery, Peter Bitley House, Thomas Bitley House, Samuel Botsford House, Esperanza, Hampstead, Uriah Hanford House, George Hays House, Ezikial Perry House, St. Luke's Episcopal Church, Sill Tenant House, Abraham Wagener House, H. Allen Wagener House, Jemima Wilkinson House (also known as Friend's Home), and Sherman Williams House and Fruit Barn.

== Geography ==
According to the United States Census Bureau, the town has a total area of 65.4 square miles (169 km^{2}), of which 58.9 square miles (153 km^{2}) is land and 6.5 square miles (17 km^{2}) (9.97%) is water.

The southern town line is the border of Steuben County. The town contains parts of each branch of Keuka Lake.

New York State Route 54A crosses the town.

== Demographics ==
Historical population
Census	Pop.	Note	%±
1820	1,610		—
1830	2,783		72.9%
1840	2,935		5.5%
1850	2,912		−0.8%
1860	2,873		−1.3%
1870	2,612		−9.1%
1880	2,626		0.5%
1890	2,957		12.6%
1900	2,775		−6.2%
1910	2,444		−11.9%
1920	2,025		−17.1%
1930	2,072		2.3%
1940	2,043		−1.4%
1950	2,732		33.7%
1960	2,847		4.2%
1970	3,581		25.8%
1980	3,908		9.1%
1990	3,784		−3.2%
2000	4,525		19.6%
2010	4,469		−1.2%
2020	4,405		−1.4%
U.S. Decennial Census

As of the census of 2000, there were 4,525 people, 1,606 households, and 1,117 families residing in the town. The population density was 76.8 inhabitants per square mile (29.7/km^{2}). There were 2,523 housing units at an average density of 42.8 per square mile (16.5/km^{2}). The racial makeup of the town was 98.39% White, 0.55% African American, 0.11% Native American, 0.29% Asian, 0.02% Pacific Islander, 0.29% from other races, and 0.35% from two or more races. Hispanic or Latino of any race were 0.66% of the population.

There were 1,606 households, out of which 25.7% had children under the age of 18 living with them, 59.4% were married couples living together, 6.6% had a female householder with no husband present, and 30.4% were non-families. 24.3% of all households were made up of individuals, and 11.2% had someone living alone who was 65 years of age or older. The average household size was 2.45, and the average family size was 2.90.

In the town, the population was spread out, with 19.9% under the age of 18, 18.7% from 18 to 24, 20.2% from 25 to 44, 26.2% from 45 to 64, and 15.1% who were 65 years of age or older. The median age was 39 years. For every 100 females, there were 88.7 males. For every 100 females age 18 and over, there were 83.7 males.

The median income for a household in the town was $38,488, and the median income for a family was $45,254. Males had a median income of $31,071 versus $25,115 for females. The per capita income for the town was $18,099. About 6.6% of families and 9.4% of the population were below the poverty line, including 17.7% of those under age 18 and 4.4% of those age 65 or over.

== Communities and locations in the Town of Jerusalem ==
- Bluff Point – A hamlet west of Keuka Park on NY-54A. Bluff Point is also the name of end of the peninsula that extends between the two north branches of Keuka Lake and is south of the community with that name.
- Branchport (originally, "Esperanza") – A hamlet at the northwest tip of Keuka Lake on NY-54A. Branchport became an incorporated village in 1867, but later abandoned that status.
- Darby Corners – A location in the south of the town, west of Branchport on County Road 32.
- Friend – A hamlet in the northwest part of the town on County Road 31.
- Guyanoga – A hamlet north of Branchport.
- Guyanoga Valley – A valley in the north-central part of Jerusalem, north of Branchport.
- Keuka College – A four-year-college in Keuka Park.
- Keuka Lake State Park – A state park in the southeast part of the town, southeast of Branchport.
- Keuka Park – A hamlet on the west shore of the east fork of Keuka Lake.
- Penn Yan – The Village of Penn Yan borders the northeast part of the town.
- Sherman Hollow – A former community located in the northwest part of Jerusalem.
- Sugar Creek – A stream flowing through Guyanoga Valley into Keuka Lake near Branchport.
- Yatesville – A hamlet at the north town line, mostly in the Town of Potter.
