= Charles Wagener House =

Historic house in New York, United States

- U.S. National Register of Historic Places
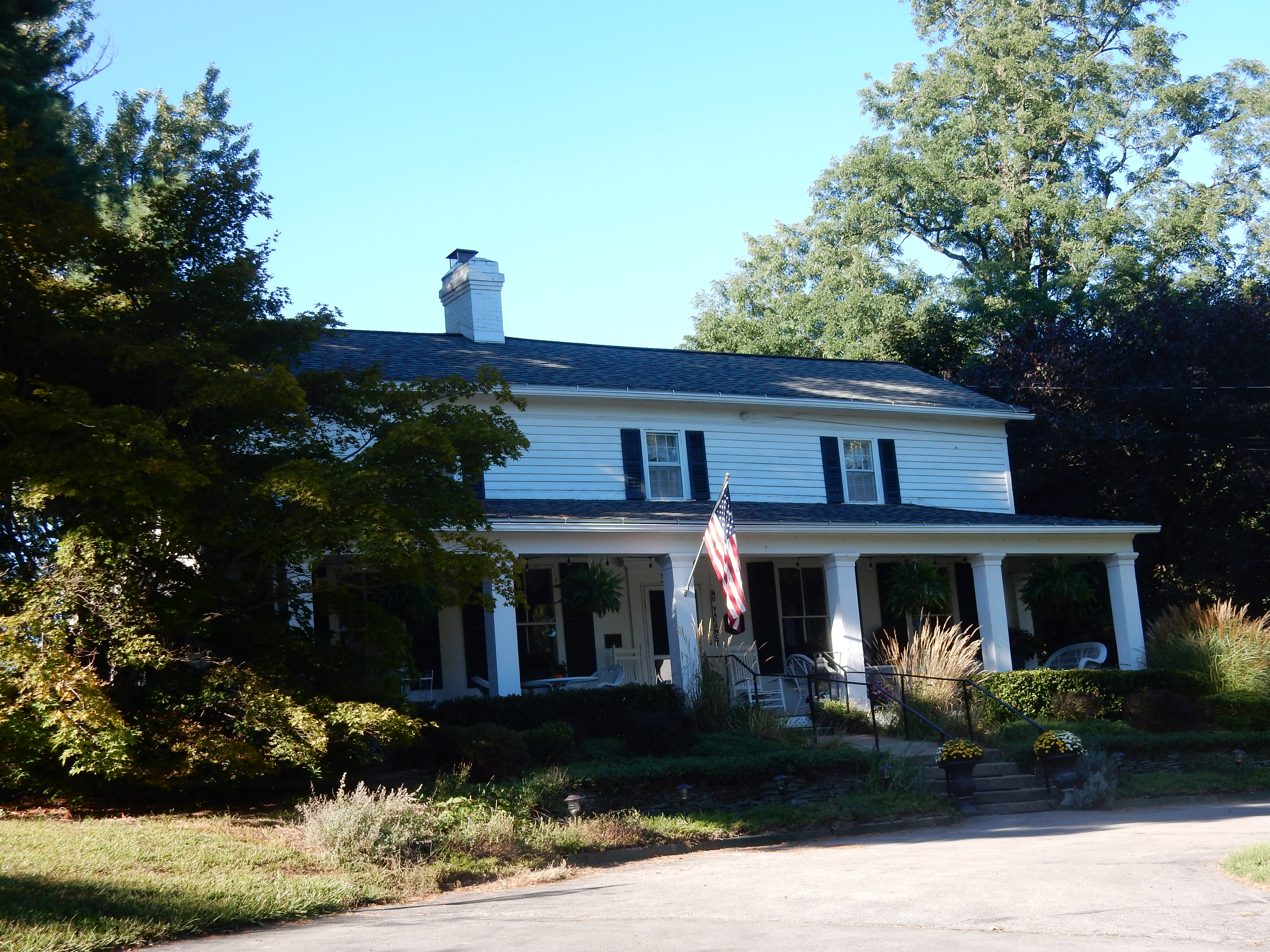
- Charles Wagener House in Penn Yan.

- Location within New York Location within the United States
- Location: 351 Elm St., Penn Yan, New York
- Coordinates: 42°39′39″N 77°3′46″W
- Area: 4.4 acres (1.8 ha)
- Built: ca. 1838
- Architectural style: Greek Revival
- MPS: Yates County MPS
- NRHP reference No.: 94000960
- Added to NRHP: August 24, 1994

Charles Wagener House is a historic home located at Penn Yan in Yates County, New York. It is a Greek Revival style structure built about 1838.

It was listed on the National Register of Historic Places in 1994.
