= Sherman Williams House and Fruit Barn =

Historic house in New York, United States

- U.S. National Register of Historic Places
- Location within New York Location within the United States
- Location: Co. Rt. 54A, Jerusalem, New York
- Coordinates: 42°37′22″N 77°5′48″W
- Area: 2.8 acres (1.1 ha)
- Built: 1875
- MPS: Yates County MPS
- NRHP reference No.: 94000966
- Added to NRHP: August 24, 1994

Sherman Williams House and Fruit Barn is a historic home and barn in Jerusalem, Yates County, New York.

It was listed on the National Register of Historic Places in 1994.
