= Middlesex, New York =

- Town
- Location in Yates County and the state of New York.
- Coordinates: 42°43′7″N 77°16′38″W
- Country: United States
- State: New York
- County: Yates

Area
  - Total: 34.10 sq mi (88.33 km^{2})
  - Land: 30.88 sq mi (79.97 km^{2})
  - Water: 3.23 sq mi (8.36 km^{2})
- Elevation: 1,132 ft (345 m)

Population (2010)
  - Total: 1,495
  - Estimate (2016): 1,469
  - Density: 47.6/sq mi (18.37/km^{2})
- Time zone: UTC-5 (Eastern (EST))
  - Summer (DST): UTC-4 (EDT)
- ZIP code: 14507
- Area code: 585
- FIPS code: 36-47020
- GNIS feature ID: 0979215

Middlesex is a town in Yates County, New York, USA. The population was 1,495 at the 2010 census. The name originates from a historic region of the UK.

The Town of Middlesex is on the northwest corner of the county and is south of Canandaigua, New York.

== History ==
A legend of the Seneca tribe states that they originated in a village called Nundawao, near the south end of Canandaigua Lake, at South Hill. Right next to South Hill stands the 865-foot-high Bare Hill, known to the Senecas as Genundowa. Bare Hill is part of the Bare Hill Unique Area, which began to be acquired by the state in 1989. Bare Hill had been the site of a Seneca or pre-Seneca fort; first written reference to this fort was made in 1825 by David Cusick in his history of the Seneca Indians.

The traces of an ancient fort, covering about an acre, and surrounded by a ditch, and formerly by a formidable wall, are still to be seen on top of Bare Hill. They indicate defenses raised by Indian hands, or more probably belong to the labors of a race that preceded the Indian occupation. The wall is now about tumbled down, the stones seem somewhat scattered, and the ground is overgrown with brush.

— S. C. Cleveland, History of Yates County, New York (1873)

In the early 1920s, the material that made up the Bare Hill fort was used by the Town of Middlesex highway department for road fill.

The first settlers arrived around 1789. The town was formed in 1796 while still part of Ontario County, New York. The town was known as "Augusta" until 1808, when the name was changed to "Middlesex" to avoid confusion with another location named Augusta. When Yates County was formed in 1823, Middlesex became part of the new county.

The Town of Potter was formed from part of Middlesex in 1832, and more of Middlesex was added to Potter in 1856.

The Bates Cobblestone Farmhouse, John Carr House, Asahel Green Farm, Middlesex Center Methodist Church, Overackers Corners Schoolhouse, and Vine Valley Methodist Church are listed on the National Register of Historic Places.

== Demographics ==
Historical population
Census	Pop.	Note	%±
1820	2,718		—
1830	3,428		26.1%
1840	1,439		−58.0%
1850	1,385		−3.8%
1860	1,303		−5.9%
1870	1,314		0.8%
1880	1,457		10.9%
1890	1,387		−4.8%
1900	1,282		−7.6%
1910	1,122		−12.5%
1920	951		−15.2%
1930	839		−11.8%
1940	764		−8.9%
1950	765		0.1%
1960	817		6.8%
1970	925		13.2%
1980	1,127		21.8%
1990	1,249		10.8%
2000	1,345		7.7%
2010	1,495		11.2%
2016 (est.)	1,469		−1.7%
U.S. Decennial Census

As of the census of 2000, there were 1,345 people, 521 households, and 376 families residing in the town. The population density was 43.6 inhabitants per square mile (16.8/km^{2}). There were 732 housing units at an average density of 23.7 per square mile (9.2/km^{2}). The racial makeup of the town was 98.74% White, 0.37% African American, 0.15% Native American, 0.15% Asian, 0.15% from other races, and 0.45% from two or more races. Hispanic or Latino of any race were 0.22% of the population. On a side note it is safe to say that cattle outnumber people at least 4 to 1.

There were 521 households out of which 33.0% had children under the age of 18 living with them, 59.7% were married couples living together, 8.1% had a female householder with no husband present, and 27.8% were non-families. 22.3% of all households were made up of individuals and 10.6% had someone living alone who was 65 years of age or older. The average household size was 2.52 and the average family size was 2.91.

In the town, the population was spread out with 25.9% under the age of 18, 6.3% from 18 to 24, 25.2% from 25 to 44, 29.0% from 45 to 64, and 13.5% who were 65 years of age or older. The median age was 41 years. For every 100 females, there were 100.7 males. For every 100 females age 18 and over, there were 98.8 males.

The median income for a household in the town was $43,618, and the median income for a family was $47,763. Males had a median income of $34,464 versus $23,676 for females. The per capita income for the town was $21,241. About 3.4% of families and 6.6% of the population were below the poverty line, including 7.3% of those under age 18 and 9.4% of those age 65 or over.

== Communities and locations in Middlesex ==
- High Tor Wildlife Management Area – A conservation area in the southwest part of the town.
- Rochester Folk Art Guild– an artist community and non-profit craft education center on Upper Hill Road.
- Middlesex – The hamlet of Middlesex is at the junction of NY-245 and NY-364 near the center of the town. The West River flows past the community.
- Overackers Corners – A location west of Valley View on County Road 10.
- Pine Corners – A hamlet north of Middlesex village on NY-245.
- Rushville – The Village of Rushville borders the northeast part of the town on NY-245.
- Valley View – A hamlet north of Middlesex village and south of Pine Corners.
- Vine Valley – A hamlet on the east shore of Canandaigua Lake at the junction of County Roads 10 and 39.
- West River – A stream flowing across the town, eventually entering Canandaigua Lake.
- Williams Corner – A hamlet northeast of Middlesex village on NY-364.
