= H. Allen Wagener House =

Historic house in New York, United States

- U.S. National Register of Historic Places
- Location within New York Location within the United States
- Location: 367 W. Lake Rd., Jerusalem, New York
- Coordinates: 42°37′35″N 77°5′33″W
- Area: less than one acre
- Built: 1935
- Architectural style: Classical Revival
- MPS: Yates County MPS
- NRHP reference No.: 94000961
- Added to NRHP: August 24, 1994

H. Allen Wagener House, also known as Brandywine, is a historic home located at Jerusalem in Yates County, New York. It is a Classical Revival style structure built about 1935.

It was listed on the National Register of Historic Places in 1994.
