= Abraham Wagener House =

Historic house in New York, United States

- U.S. National Register of Historic Places
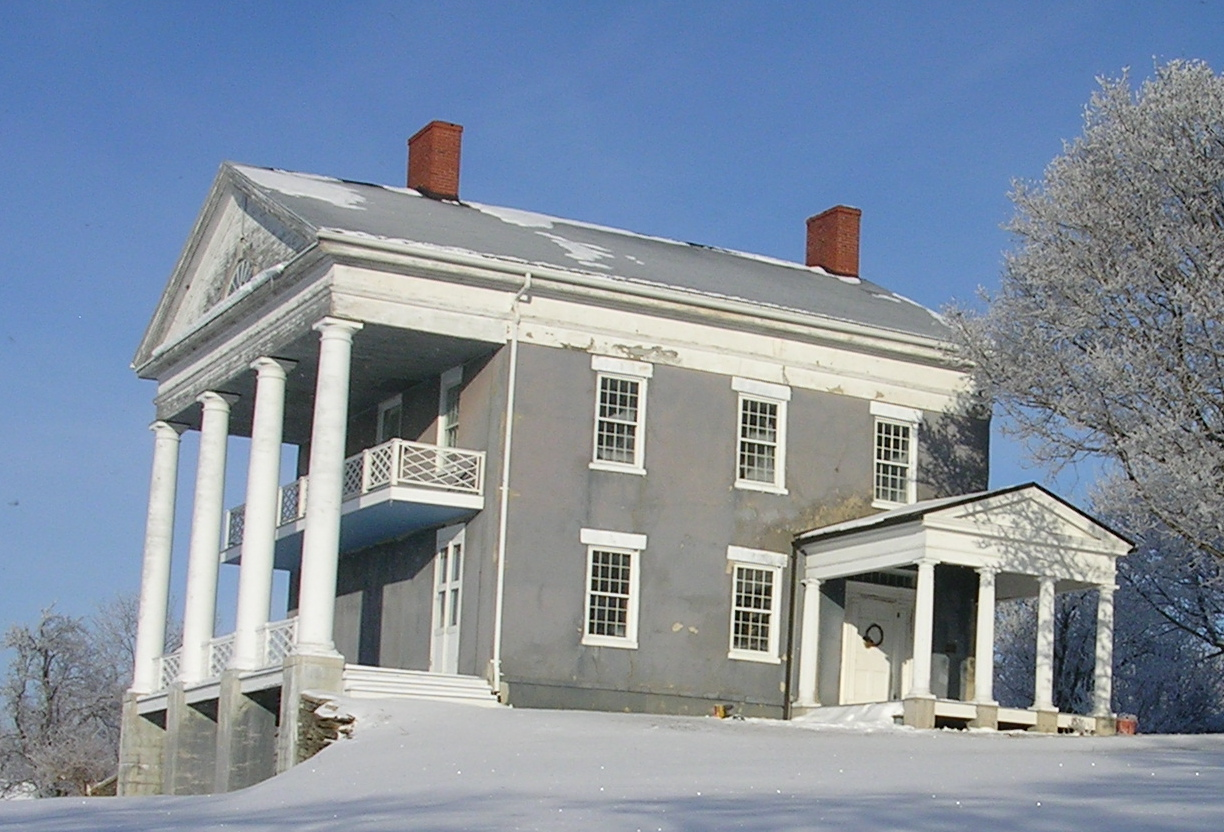
- Abraham Wagener House

- Location within New York Location within the United States
- Location: Skyline Rd., Jerusalem, New York
- Coordinates: 42°30′36″N 77°8′15″W
- Area: 157 acres (64 ha)
- Built: 1833
- Architectural style: Classical Revival
- MPS: Yates County MPS
- NRHP reference No.: 94000959
- Added to NRHP: August 24, 1994

Abraham Wagener House is a historic house located at Jerusalem in Yates County, New York. This Greek Revival style structure was built about 1833 and features a monumental proportioned temple portico with full pediment and wide entablature supported by massive two-story columns.

It was listed on the National Register of Historic Places in 1994.
