= List of county routes in Yates County, New York =

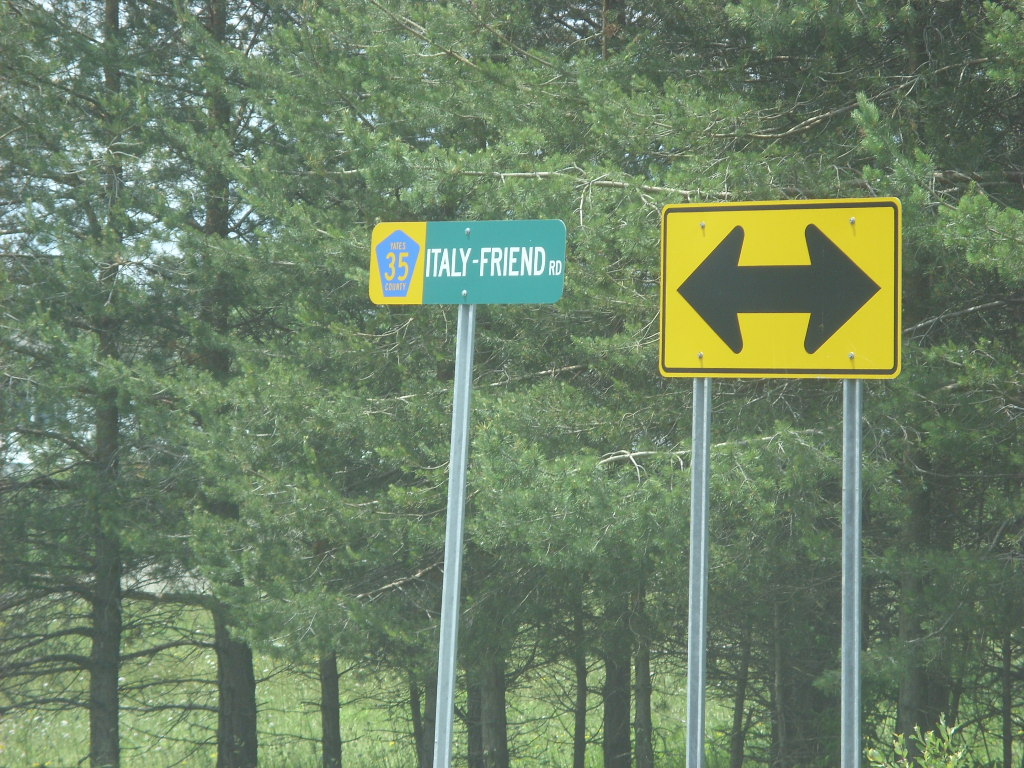
- Yates County Route 35 reassurance marker near Branchport, an example of the type used in the county.

Highway names
- Interstates: Interstate X (I-X)
- US Highways: U.S. Route X (US X)
- State: New York State Route X (NY X)
- County: County Route X (CR X)

System links
- New York Highways; Interstate; US; State; Reference; Parkways

County routes in Yates County, New York, are signed with the Manual on Uniform Traffic Control Devices-standard yellow-on-blue pentagon route marker. Route numbers are also posted at junctions on street blade signs that display the standard route marker for a given route inside a yellow square. Even numbered highways run from east to west and are assigned sequentially starting from the northern county line, while odd numbered highways run from north to south and are assigned sequentially starting from the eastern county line at Seneca Lake.

== List of routes ==
Route	Length (mi)	Length (km)	From	Via	To	Notes
CR 1	13.62	21.92	NY 14 in Starkey	Lakemont–Himrod and Himrod roads	Penn Yan village line in Milo	
CR 2	2.73	4.39	Ontario County line (becomes CR 29)	Ferguson Corners Road in Benton	NY 14A	
CR 3	2.04	3.28	Dresden village line	Anthony Road in Torrey	NY 14	
CR 4	6.11	9.83	Rushville village line in Potter	Ferguson Corners and Payne roads	CR 2 in Benton	
CR 5	3.61	5.81	Dundee village line	Dundee–Himrod Road in Starkey	CR 1	
CR 6	1.96	3.15	CR 15	Earls Hill Road in Benton	NY 14	
CR 7	1.79	2.88	CR 1 in Milo	Flynn Road	CR 26 in Torrey	
CR 8	2.67	4.30	NY 14A	Bellona Station Road in Benton	CR 15	
CR 9	7.95	12.79	CR 1 in Milo	Ridge Road	CR 6 in Benton	
CR 10	2.96	4.76	CR 39	North Vine Valley Road in Middlesex	NY 364	Formerly part of NY 21A
CR 10F	0.78	1.26	NY 364	Pierce Hill Road in Middlesex	NY 245	Signed as part of CR 10
CR 11	6.65	10.70	NY 14A in Barrington	Chubb Hollow Road	CR 1 in Milo	
CR 12	2.08	3.35	NY 364 in Middlesex	Dunton and Ward Simmons roads	NY 247 in Potter	
CR 13	2.93	4.72	Schuyler County line	Six Corners Road in Barrington	Pre-Emption Road	
CR 14	6.88	11.07	CR 27 in Potter	Havens Corners Road	CR 9 in Torrey	
CR 15	6.61	10.64	NY 54	Pre-Emption Road in Benton	Ontario County line (becomes CR 6)	
CR 16	1.11	1.79	CR 9	Travis Road in Torrey	NY 14	
CR 17	11.98	19.28	Schuyler County line in Barrington (becomes CR 26)	Old Bath Road	NY 54 in Milo	
CR 18	12.83	20.65	Ontario County line in Italy (becomes CR 21)	Italy Valley Road	NY 364 in Potter	
CR 19	0.60	0.97	Penn Yan village line	North Main Street in Benton	NY 14A	
CR 20			Penn Yan village line	North Avenue on Benton–Milo town line	NY 54	Former number
CR 21	2.04	3.28	CR 25	West Lake Road in Jerusalem	NY 54A	
CR 22	4.36	7.02	CR 29	Sherman Hollow Road in Jerusalem	CR 24	
CR 23	5.90	9.50	CR 22	Lovejoy Road in Benton	CR 2	
CR 24	6.26	10.07	CR 29	County House Road in Jerusalem	NY 364	
CR 25	1.36	2.19	NY 54A	Central and Assembly avenues in Jerusalem	NY 54A	
CR 26	3.04	4.89	CR 9 in Milo	City Hill Road	NY 14 in Torrey	
CR 27	4.84	7.79	NY 364	Voak Road in Potter	Ontario County line (becomes CR 24)	
CR 28	2.91	4.68	CR 1 in Milo	Leach Road	NY 14 in Torrey	
CR 29	6.76	10.88	NY 54A / CR 32 in Jerusalem	Guyanoga Road	NY 364 in Potter	
CR 30	3.83	6.16	NY 54	Second Milo in Milo	CR 11	
CR 31	5.19	8.35	CR 29 in Jerusalem	Friend Road	NY 364 in Potter	Part north of CR 35 was formerly part of NY 53
CR 32	6.41	10.32	Steuben County line in Italy (becomes CR 122)	Italy Hill Road	NY 54A / CR 29 in Jerusalem	Part east of CR 35 was designated NY 273 from c. 1931 to early 1940s: Part between Wetmore Road and CR 55 was formerly part of NY 53
CR 33	1.55	2.49	Steuben County line (becomes CR 78)	Darbys Corner Road in Jerusalem	CR 32	
CR 34	3.09	4.97	CR 18	Italy Hill Turnpike in Italy	CR 32	
CR 35	2.02	3.25	CR 32 in Italy	Italy Friend Road	CR 31 in Jerusalem	Former routing of NY 53
CR 36	1.86	2.99	CR 1	Plum Point Road in Milo	North Plum Point Road at Seneca Lake	Discontinuous at NY 14
CR 37	5.26	8.47	Three Hills Road in Italy	Shay Road	NY 364 in Middlesex	
CR 38	1.19	1.92	CR 17	Porters Corners Road in Barrington	NY 14A	
CR 39	2.91	4.68	CR 10	East Lake Road in Middlesex	Ontario County line (becomes CR 11)	
CR 40	2.84	4.57	Elizabeth Street	Dundee Starkey Road in Starkey	NY 14	
CR 42	1.96	3.15	CR 40	Dundee–Lakemont Road in Starkey	NY 14	
CR 44	3.22	5.18	Dundee village line	Dundee Glenora Road in Starkey	NY 14	
CR 46	2.44	3.93	NY 14A	Rock Stream Road in Starkey	NY 14	
CR 48	1.10	1.77	CR 17	Hobson Road in Barrington	NY 14A	

== See also ==
- County routes in New York
- List of former state routes in New York (201–300)
