= Spicer-Millard House =

Historic house in New York, United States

- U.S. National Register of Historic Places
- Location within New York Location within the United States
- Location: Crystal Springs Rd. (NY 230), Barrington, New York
- Coordinates: 42°30′3″N 77°2′43″W
- Area: 7.4 acres (3.0 ha)
- Built: ca. 1819
- Architectural style: Federal
- MPS: Yates County MPS
- NRHP reference No.: 94000953
- Added to NRHP: August 24, 1994

Spicer-Millard House is a historic home located at Barrington in Yates County, New York. It is a five- by two-bay Federal style residence built about 1819.

It was listed on the National Register of Historic Places in 1994.
