= Wayne, New York =

Town in Steuben County, New York, US

- Town
- Location within the state of New York
- Coordinates: 42°27′14″N 77°7′38″W
- Country: United States
- State: New York
- County: Steuben
- Named after: Anthony Wayne

Area
  - Total: 22.59 sq mi (58.52 km^{2})
  - Land: 20.58 sq mi (53.31 km^{2})
  - Water: 2.02 sq mi (5.22 km^{2})
- Elevation: 1,350 ft (410 m)

Population (2020)
  - Total: 1,006 ▼
  - Estimate (2021): 997
  - Density: 49.3/sq mi (19.02/km^{2})
- Time zone: UTC-5 (Eastern (EST))
  - Summer (DST): UTC-4 (EDT)
- FIPS code: 36-78883
- GNIS feature ID: 0979612

Wayne is a town located in the northeast corner of Steuben County, New York, United States. As of the 2020 census, the town population was 1,006. The town was named after the Revolutionary War general, Anthony Wayne.

The Town of Wayne is northeast of Bath.

== History ==
The region was first settled by Europeans circa 1791 by Abraham Hendricks, and it was organized as the "Town of Frederickstown" on May 18, 1796, when the County of Steuben was formed from a part of the larger Ontario County. Early settlers include Ephriam Sanford, Anthony Swarthout, Jabez Hopkins, and Joseph Bailey.

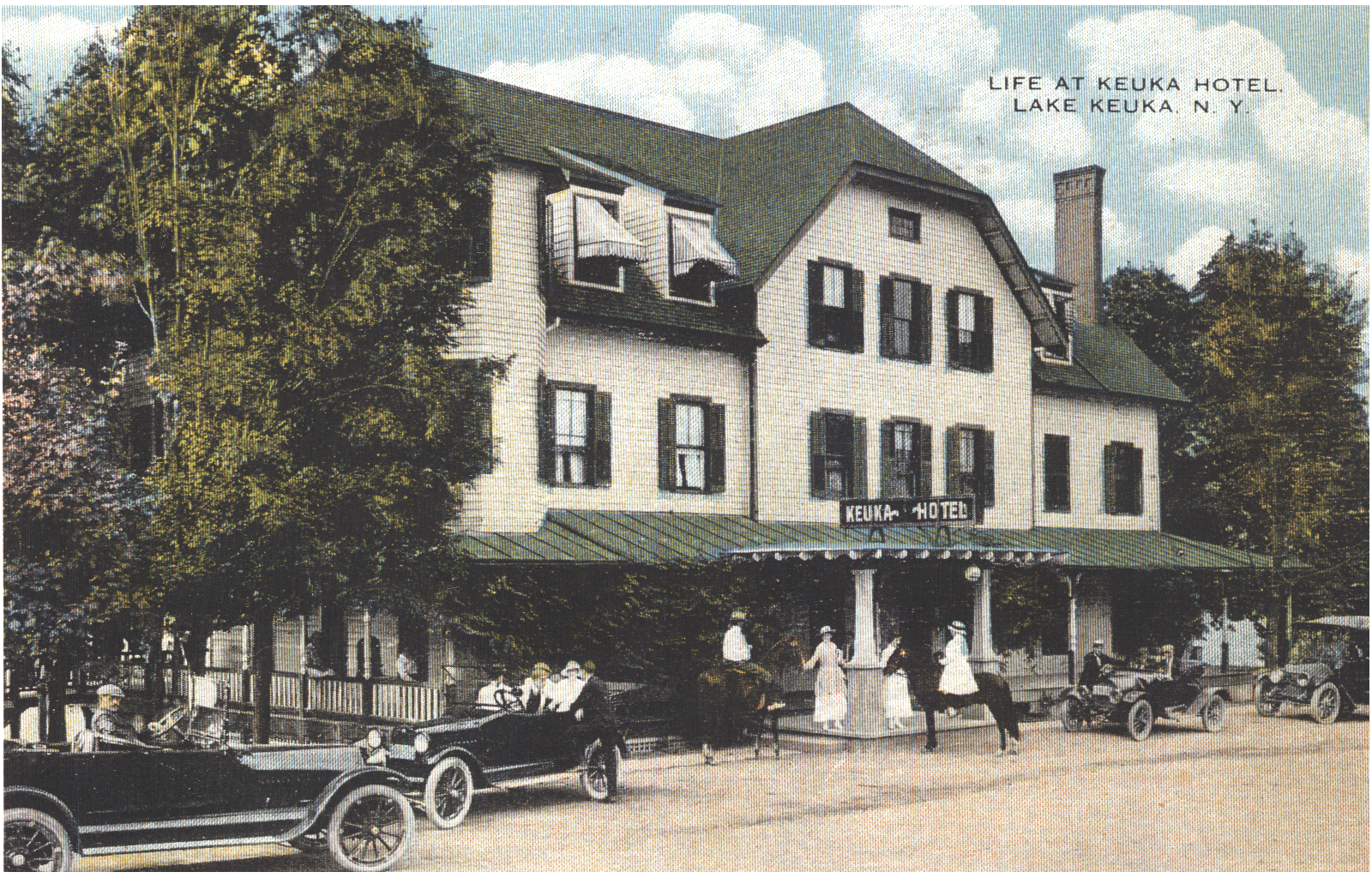
Postcard view of the Keuka Hotel, around 1920.

The town changed its name to "Wayne" on April 6, 1808, in honor of the Revolutionary War hero, General Anthony Wayne, and included what is now the smaller hamlet of Wayne, New York. Afterwards, the town was substantially reduced in size by the formation of other towns, including Reading (1806), Orange (1813) and Barrington, and Tyrone (1822). In 1854, the size of the township was again reduced by moving a parcel of land to the town of Tyrone, which included a large portion of the hamlet of Wayne. Also, a former hamlet in the township, further south, was known as "Wayne Four Corners".

=== Famous natives and locations in Wayne ===
Wayne native Jonathan Goble is said to have invented the rickshaw in 1859. He was a Marine who traveled with Commodore Matthew Perry's squadron which opened Japan to western trade. He later returned as a Baptist missionary and was inspired to invent the rickshaw in order to transport his invalid wife around the streets of Tokyo.

Francis M. McDowell, one of the seven founders of the National Grange and its treasurer for 21 years was born in Wayne, NY. In the 1860s, he returned to Wayne to grow grapes on the shores of Lake Keuka. He was also involved with his brother-in-law Samuel Hallett, in several enterprises. Samuel Hallett is known for building the largest home in Wayne, known as the "Aisle of Pines". It was a 20-column mansion, built in 1854, but it burned to the ground in 1974.

The Hallett House (Aisle of Pines) in the late 1800s

A famous landmark in the township was the Keuka Hotel, built in 1895 on the shores of Lake Keuka. Hoagy Carmichael was the pianist and vocalist at the hotel for two seasons, and local legend has it that his 1927 hit song "Stardust" was written while at the Keuka hotel.

== Geography ==
According to the United States Census Bureau, the town has a total area of 22.6 square miles (59 km^{2}), of which 20.7 square miles (54 km^{2}) is land and 1.9 square miles (4.9 km^{2}) (8.33%) is water.

The northern town line and part of the eastern town boundary are the border of Yates County. The remainder of the eastern town line is the border of Schuyler County. The northern part of the town is on the southeastern shore of Keuka Lake, and part of the eastern section of the town is on the west shore of Waneta Lake.

New York State Route 54 runs down the eastern shore of Keuka Lake, and New York State Route 230 loops through the northeastern part of the town.

== Demographics ==
Historical population
Census	Pop.	Note	%±
1820	3,607		—
1830	1,172		−67.5%
1840	1,377		17.5%
1850	1,347		−2.2%
1860	944		−29.9%
1870	891		−5.6%
1880	827		−7.2%
1890	889		7.5%
1900	838		−5.7%
1910	643		−23.3%
1920	516		−19.8%
1930	516		0.0%
1940	577		11.8%
1950	581		0.7%
1960	715		23.1%
1970	902		26.2%
1980	1,066		18.2%
1990	1,029		−3.5%
2000	1,165		13.2%
2010	1,041		−10.6%
2020	1,006		−3.4%
2021 (est.)	997		−0.9%
U.S. Decennial Census

As of the census of 2000, there were 1,165 people, 494 households, and 363 families residing in the town. The population density was 56.3 people per square mile (21.7 people/km^{2}). There were 1,242 housing units at an average density of 60.0 per square mile (23.2/km^{2}). The racial makeup of the town was 98.03% White, 0.17% Native American, 1.12% Asian, 0.09% from other races, and 0.60% from two or more races. 0.17% of the population were Hispanic or Latino of any race.

There were 494 households, out of which 23.1% had children under the age of 18 living with them, 65.6% were married couples living together, 5.1% had a female householder with no husband present, and 26.5% were non-families. 22.7% of all households were made up of individuals, and 10.9% had someone living alone who was 65 years of age or older. The average household size was 2.36 and the average family size was 2.75.

In the town, the population was spread out, with 19.9% under the age of 18, 6.4% from 18 to 24, 20.9% from 25 to 44, 32.2% from 45 to 64, and 20.5% who were 65 years of age or older. The median age was 47 years. For every 100 females, there were 95.5 males. For every 100 females age 18 and over, there were 95.6 males.

The median income for a household in the town was $38,056, and the median income for a family was $42,292. Males had a median income of $32,841 versus $23,462 for females. The per capita income for the town was $21,563. 8.1% of the population and 5.2% of families were below the poverty line. Out of the total population, 14.6% of those under the age of 18 and 9.0% of those 65 and older were living below the poverty line.

== Communities and locations in the Town of Wayne ==
- Grove Springs – A hamlet on the shore of Keuka Lake, south of Keuka on NY-54.
- Keuka Village – A hamlet on the shore of Keuka Lake at the junction of NY-54 and NY-230.
- North Urbana – A hamlet on the west town line.
- Sylvan Beach – A hamlet southwest of Wayne hamlet on County Road 97, on the west side of Waneta Lake.
- Wayne – The hamlet of Wayne is on the east town line so that it is partly in Schuyler County. NY-230 passes through the Hamlet.
- Wayne Four Corners – A location in the south part of the town, east of North Urbana.
