= Thomas Bennett Curtis House =

Historic house in New York, United States

- U.S. National Register of Historic Places
- Location within New York Location within the United States
- Location: Shannon Corners Rd., Starkey, New York
- Coordinates: 42°33′0″N 76°55′53″W
- Area: 93 acres (38 ha)
- Built: 1851
- Architectural style: Gothic Revival
- MPS: Yates County MPS
- NRHP reference No.: 94000932
- Added to NRHP: August 24, 1994

Thomas Bennett Curtis House is a historic home located at Starkey in Yates County, New York. It is a Gothic Revival style structure built about 1851.

It was listed on the National Register of Historic Places in 1994.
