= Route 54A =

Route 54A may refer to:

- New York State Route 54A, a state highway in New York, United States
- Dublin Bus, a public transport operator in Ireland
