= John Noyes House =

Historic home in Yates County, New York, USA

- U.S. National Register of Historic Places
- Location within New York Location within the United States
- Location: Lakemont-Himrod Rd., Starkey, New York
- Coordinates: 42°31′19″N 76°55′33″W
- Area: 33 acres (13 ha)
- Built: 1840
- Architectural style: Greek Revival
- MPS: Yates County MPS
- NRHP reference No.: 94000947
- Added to NRHP: August 24, 1994

John Noyes House is a historic home located at Starkey in Yates County, New York. It is a Greek Revival style structure built about 1840. 33 acres are historically associated with this property, including a barn and a smokehouse. The house is an example of a typical farmstead for the era.

It was listed on the National Register of Historic Places in 1994.
