= Miles Raplee House =

Historic house in New York, United States

- U.S. National Register of Historic Places
- Location within New York Location within the United States
- Location: Randall Rd., Milo, New York
- Coordinates: 42°37′3″N 76°55′25″W
- Area: 18.1 acres (7.3 ha)
- Built: 1845
- Architectural style: Greek Revival
- MPS: Yates County MPS
- NRHP reference No.: 94000951
- Added to NRHP: August 24, 1994

Miles Raplee House is a historic home located at Milo in Yates County, New York. This Greek Revival style structure was built about 1845 and features a monumental proportioned temple portico with full pediment and wide entablature supported by massive two story columns.

It was listed on the National Register of Historic Places in 1994.

Historic functions: Single dwelling, Agricultural outbuildings.
