= John Briggs House =

Historic house in New York, United States

- U.S. National Register of Historic Places
- Location within New York Location within the United States
- Location: 2646 Himrod Rd., Milo Center, New York
- Coordinates: 42°38′7″N 77°0′1″W
- Area: 3.1 acres (1.3 ha)
- Built: 1795
- Architectural style: Federal
- MPS: Yates County MPS
- NRHP reference No.: 94000930
- Added to NRHP: August 24, 1994

John Briggs House is a historic home located at Milo Center in Yates County, New York. It is a Federal style structure built about 1795.

It was listed on the National Register of Historic Places in 1994.
