= Starkey United Methodist Church =

Historic church in New York, United States

- U.S. National Register of Historic Places
- Location within New York Location within the United States
- Location: Lakemont-Himrod Rd., Starkey, New York
- Coordinates: 42°32′11″N 76°56′4″W
- Area: less than one acre
- Built: 1828
- Architectural style: Greek Revival
- MPS: Yates County MPS
- NRHP reference No.: 94000955
- Added to NRHP: August 24, 1994

Starkey United Methodist Church is a historic United Methodist church located at Starkey in Yates County, New York. It is a Greek Revival style structure built about 1828.

It was listed on the National Register of Historic Places in 1994.
