= Jonathan Bailey House (Milo, New York) =

Historic house in New York, United States

- U.S. National Register of Historic Places
- Location within New York Location within the United States
- Location: Bath Rd., Milo, New York
- Coordinates: 42°35′22″N 77°3′34″W
- Area: 5.5 acres (2.2 ha)
- Built: c. 1825
- Architectural style: Federal
- MPS: Yates County MPS
- NRHP reference No.: 94000926
- Added to NRHP: August 24, 1994

The Jonathan Bailey House is a historic house located on Bath Road in Milo, Yates County, New York.

== Description and history ==
It is a lighthanded version of a Federal-style residence built in about 1825.

It was listed on the National Register of Historic Places on August 24, 1994.
