= Dr. Henry Spence Cobblestone Farmhouse and Barn Complex =

Historic house in New York, United States

- U.S. National Register of Historic Places
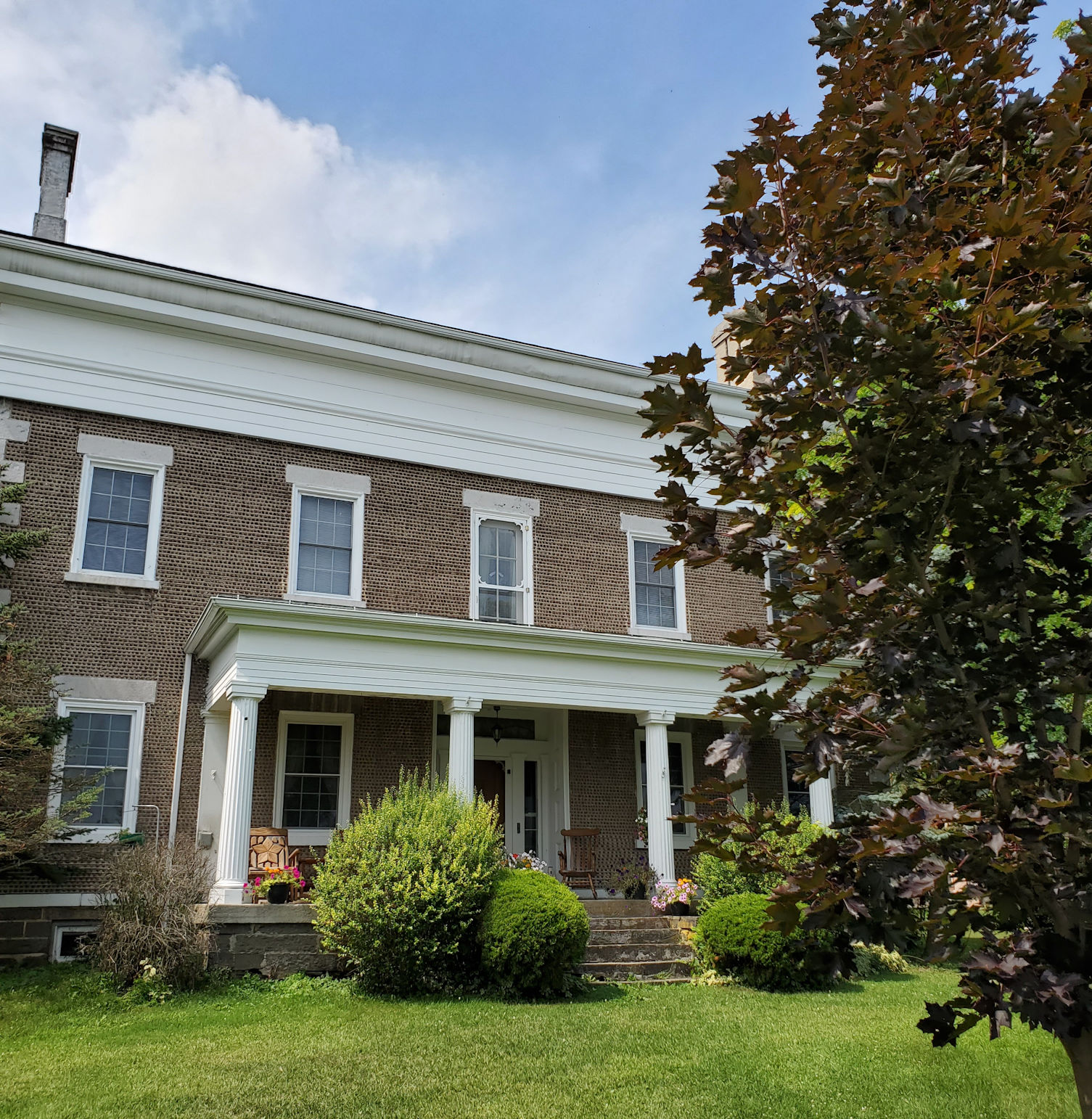

- Location within New York Location within the United States
- Location: Lakemont-Himrod Rd. N of jct. with Shannon Corners Rd., Starkey, New York
- Coordinates: 42°33′21″N 76°56′48″W
- Area: 16.2 acres (6.6 ha)
- Built: 1848
- Architectural style: Greek Revival, Vernacular Greek Revival
- MPS: Cobblestone Architecture of New York State MPS
- NRHP reference No.: 92000441
- Added to NRHP: May 11, 1992

Dr. Henry Spence Cobblestone Farmhouse and Barn Complex is a historic home located at Starkey in Yates County, New York. The farmhouse was built about 1848 and is a massive 2 1/2-story, five-bay, center hall building decorated with elements associated with the Greek Revival style. The cobblestone house is built of small, reddish lake washed cobbles. The farmhouse is among the nine surviving cobblestone buildings in Yates County. Also on the property are the remains of six contributing support structures.

It was listed on the National Register of Historic Places in 1992.
