= William Swarthout Farm =

Historic house in New York, United States

- U.S. National Register of Historic Places
- Location within New York Location within the United States
- Location: Bath Rd., Milo, New York
- Coordinates: 42°38′3″N 77°3′35″W
- Area: 32.3 acres (13.1 ha)
- Built: 1850
- Architectural style: Greek Revival
- MPS: Yates County MPS
- NRHP reference No.: 94000956
- Added to NRHP: August 24, 1994

William Swarthout Farm is a historic home located at Milo in Yates County, New York. This Greek Revival-style structure was built about 1850 and features the two-by-two-bay, 1 1/2-story central block and single-story wing with porch and entrance.

It was listed on the National Register of Historic Places in 1994.
