= William Swortz House =

Historic house in New York, United States

- U.S. National Register of Historic Places
- Location within New York Location within the United States
- Location: Dundee-Himrod Rd., Starkey, New York
- Coordinates: 42°32′53″N 76°58′24″W
- Area: 36 acres (15 ha)
- Built: 1874
- Architectural style: Stick/Eastlake
- MPS: Yates County MPS
- NRHP reference No.: 94000957
- Added to NRHP: August 24, 1994

William Swortz House is a historic home located at Starkey in Yates County, New York. It is a Queen Anne style structure built about 1874.

It was listed on the National Register of Historic Places in 1994.
