= Daniel Supplee Cobblestone Farmhouse =

Historic house in New York, United States

- U.S. National Register of Historic Places
- Location within New York Location within the United States
- Location: 4420 Dundee-Himrod Rd., Starkey, New York
- Coordinates: 42°33′4″N 76°58′22″W
- Area: 1.5 acres (0.61 ha)
- Built: 1835
- Architectural style: Greek Revival, Late Victorian
- MPS: Cobblestone Architecture of New York State MPS
- NRHP reference No.: 92000442
- Added to NRHP: May 11, 1992

Daniel Supplee Cobblestone Farmhouse is a historic home located at Starkey in Yates County, New York. The farmhouse was built about 1835 and remodeled sometime before 1876. It began as a vernacular, L-shaped, late Federal / early Greek Revival style farmhouse. The cobblestone house is built of variously colored and irregularly shaped field cobbles. The farmhouse is among the nine surviving cobblestone buildings in Yates County.

It was listed on the National Register of Historic Places in 1992.
