= Rock Stream, New York =

- Hamlet
- Location within New York Location within the United States
- Coordinates: 42°28′16″N 76°55′39″W
- Country: United States
- State: New York
- County: Yates
- Town: Starkey
- Elevation: 879 ft (268 m)
- Time zone: UTC-5 (Eastern (EST))
  - Summer (DST): UTC-4 (EDT)
- ZIP code: 14878
- Area code: 607
- GNIS feature ID: 962734

Rock Stream is a hamlet in the town of Starkey, Yates County, New York, United States. The community is located near New York State Route 14 and is 4.4 miles (7.1 km) southeast of Dundee. Rock Stream has a post office with ZIP code 14878, which opened on September 19, 1820.
