= YMCA Camp Cory =

Summer camp in New York State, U.S.

Camp Cory
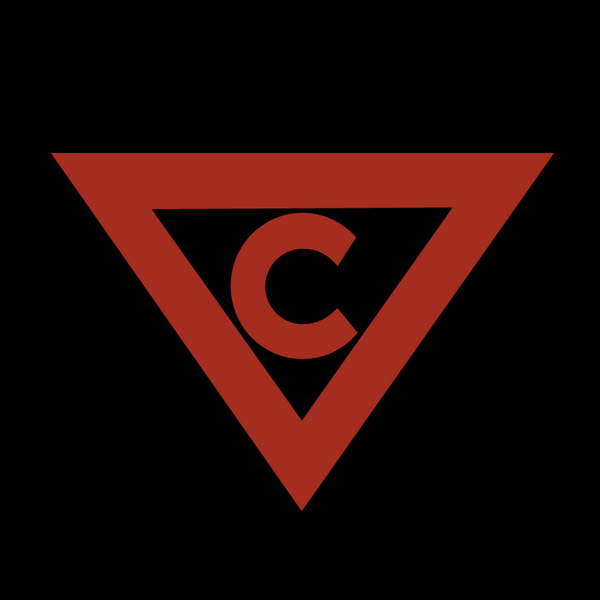
- Interactive map of Camp Cory
- Location: Keuka Lake, New York
- Coordinates: 42.636663°N 77.072789°W
- Established: 1892
- Website: www.campcory.org

YMCA Camp Lawrence Cory, better known as "YMCA Camp Cory" or simply "Camp Cory," is a resident-style summer camp in the Finger Lakes region of upstate New York. It was founded in 1892 and established at its current location in 1921. The name comes from Lt. H. Lawrence Cory, an American World War I soldier who was killed in action.

Camp Cory is run by the YMCA and is certified by the American Camp Association (ACA). The 27-acre property is 2 miles (3.2 km) south of the village of Penn Yan, in the town of Milo, New York. It is about an hour south of Rochester, New York and about an hour and a half southwest of Syracuse, New York. The camp occupies a significant amount of waterfront property.

== Background ==
YMCA Camp Cory is one of the oldest camps in the State of New York; however, its predecessor was a Rochester YMCA camp called Camp Iola. Since Camp Iola was founded in 1892, including this as a part of Camp Cory's history places it among the oldest continually running resident camps in the nation. At current, it would appear that Camp Cory is the seventh-oldest camp in the world.

Camp Cory's sailing program utilizes mainly donated RS Quests, which have all but replaced the older JY15s and the much older Wright-built K-Boats acquired by the camp in the 1950s. K-Boats, named after the famous Kohinoor Diamond, are no longer manufactured. Although its fleet has been significantly reduced in recent years, Camp Cory once had – and possibly continues to have – the largest fleet of K-Boats in the world. In 2008, the camp received a donation of two J-24 boats.

The camp draws its attendance predominantly from Rochester and its suburbs, although campers often come from Syracuse, Buffalo and other towns in New York. Campers have also come from such places as Missouri, Connecticut, California, Massachusetts, Virginia, Florida, Columbia, Sweden, Brazil, Spain, and Japan.

Camp Cory uses a significant number of new media and social media in its advertising and in keeping in contact with parents and alumni. For example, photos of all-camp games and evening programs are sent out via Twitter, as they occur.

== Summer camp ==
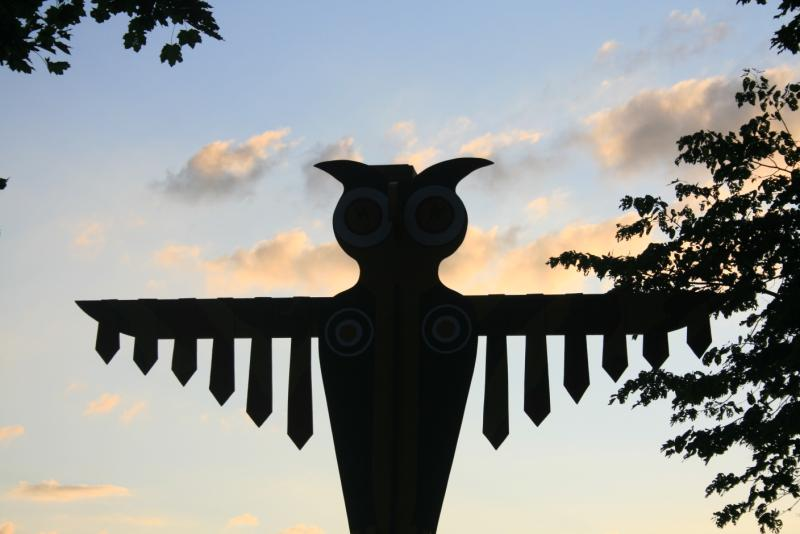
The Cory "Thunderbird," where all-camp meetings take place. This Thunderbird replaced the old one in 2007.

=== Villages ===
Each session is 1 week long, each with a special theme. Campers are both male and female and may be anywhere between 7 and 15 years of age. In some occasions, ages 6–7 will be in Keuka Lodge, which sleeps 32 as it is one of the smaller villages. 7-10-year-olds are predominantly assigned to Craig Village, 11-13-year-olds to Wells Village, and 13-14-15-year-olds to Walmsley Village. 11-15-year-olds who wish to participate in an intensive sailing program live in Maijgren Village, on the waterfront. Maijgren Village offers three 2-week sessions that conclude with the Periods regatta, where the winning skipper and crew are invited to participate in the Cups race during the final week of the summer. All of the villages are named after persons who once attended or who significantly affected the camp. In addition to the resident camp program, Camp Cory recently added a Day Camp for children ages 5 – Freshman year of highschool, drawn from the local community and from families vacationing on Keuka Lake.

=== Leadership program ===
16- to 17-year-olds can participate in a 3-week Counselor-in-Training (CIT) program. CITs live for 3 weeks in the leadership village. During that time, CITs shadow counselors, learn valuable leadership and childcare skills, and participate in a team-building work project. For the second two weeks of the CIT session, the CITs are placed in cabins or in Day Camp, essentially acting as apprentice counselors. Exceptional CITs are sometimes invited to remain at camp for the summer as paid Interns.

=== Capacity and facilities ===
Camp Cory has a capacity of over 220 beds. In recent summers, there have been around 1300 camper-weeks registered per summer (this means that one camper registering for three weeks is counted three times).

Camp Cory's facilities are expansive, including three waterfronts (one for swimming, one for sailing, and one for canoeing & kayaking), a three faced climbing wall with a zip-line, an archery range, an outdoor amphitheatre, tennis courts, open fields for athletics, and outdoor basketball courts. Camp Cory also owns a sizable amount of land in Guyanoga, a hamlet north of Branchport, New York, and purchased additional land at the site in 2010. A parcel of land, directly to the south and adjacent to the camp, was added in 2014.

=== Renovations ===
The summer of 2008 saw renovations of the Leroy Health Lodge as well as the addition of a high ropes course. In 2009 the camp built additional staff housing along the northern edge of the camp, as well as an alumni-overnight cabin in Junior Village (named "Craig Village"). In 2009 and 2010, the camp office – one of the oldest buildings on the property, dating back to the early 1920s – was renovated extensively.

In the summer of 2018, the Farmstead was developed with some property towards the south, with the goal to expand upon the day camp program and ultimately increase connection with the local community. This included building a barn, a pavilion known as the Treehouse, a garden, and a new archery range.

In 2020, the Mangurian dining hall was expanded to serve the growing camp population and improve accessibility. Six new leadership cabins were constructed as well.

== Notable alumni ==
- Teddy Geiger – Musician
- A.J. Kitt – Olympic downhill skier
- Harry T. Mangurian, Jr. – Former owner of the Boston Celtics
- Julia Nunes – Singer/songwriter
- Andrea and Laura Nix - Oscar Winning and Nominated Movie Producers
