= Torrey, New York =

- Town
- Location in Yates County and the state of New York.
- Coordinates: 42°40′44″N 76°57′31″W
- Country: United States
- State: New York
- County: Yates

Area
  - Total: 33.68 sq mi (87.22 km^{2})
  - Land: 22.76 sq mi (58.95 km^{2})
  - Water: 10.92 sq mi (28.27 km^{2})
- Elevation: 518 ft (158 m)

Population (2010)
  - Total: 1,282
  - Estimate (2016): 1,249
  - Density: 54.9/sq mi (21.19/km^{2})
- Time zone: UTC-5 (Eastern (EST))
  - Summer (DST): UTC-4 (EDT)
- FIPS code: 36-75055
- GNIS feature ID: 0979555

Torrey is a town in Yates County, New York, United States. The population was 1,282 at the 2010 census. The name is taken from that of early county political leader Henry Torrey.

The Town of Torrey is in the east central part of the county and is south of Geneva.

The town of Torrey is unrelated to the 10,000+ acre Torrey Farms, located in Elba and Potter, which is one of the largest farms in New York.

== History ==
The town was first settled around 1788 by members of the Society of Universal Friends, a religious group led by a former Quaker preacher known as the Public Universal Friend.

The Crooked Lake Canal, opened in 1833, ran across the south part of Torrey.

The town was formed on November 14, 1851, from parts of the Town of Benton and Town of Milo. Torrey was the last town formed in the county.

The town was named "Torrey" in order to secure the support of Henry Torrey to enable the creation of the new town over the objections of the two towns losing their territory.

The Young-Leach Cobblestone Farmhouse and Barn Complex was listed on the National Register of Historic Places in 1992.

== Geography ==
According to the United States Census Bureau, the town has a total area of 33.7 square miles (87 km^{2}), of which 22.7 square miles (59 km^{2}) is land and 11.0 square miles (28 km^{2}) (32.63%) is water.

Torrey is in the Finger Lakes Region of New York. The eastern town line, delineated by Seneca Lake is the border of Seneca County. The Keuka Lake Outlet, which flows from Keuka Lake to Seneca Lake, is near the middle of the township.

New York State Route 14 is a north-south highway near Seneca Lake. NY-14 intersects New York State Route 54 at Dresden.

== Demographics ==
Historical population
Census	Pop.	Note	%±
1860	1,364		—
1870	1,281		−6.1%
1880	1,245		−2.8%
1890	1,197		−3.9%
1900	1,065		−11.0%
1910	1,018		−4.4%
1920	916		−10.0%
1930	804		−12.2%
1940	765		−4.9%
1950	948		23.9%
1960	1,007		6.2%
1970	1,186		17.8%
1980	1,363		14.9%
1990	1,269		−6.9%
2000	1,307		3.0%
2010	1,282		−1.9%
2016 (est.)	1,249		−2.6%
U.S. Decennial Census

As of the census of 2000, there were 1,307 people, 477 households, and 361 families residing in the town. The population density was 57.5 inhabitants per square mile (22.2/km^{2}). There were 696 housing units at an average density of 30.6 per square mile (11.8/km^{2}). The racial makeup of the town was 97.93% White, 0.08% African American, 0.08% Native American, 0.15% Asian, 1.22% from other races, and 0.54% from two or more races. Hispanic or Latino of any race were 2.68% of the population.

There were 477 households, out of which 28.1% had children under the age of 18 living with them, 65.6% were married couples living together, 6.3% had a female householder with no husband present, and 24.3% were non-families. 19.3% of all households were made up of individuals, and 9.9% had someone living alone who was 65 years of age or older. The average household size was 2.72 and the average family size was 3.09.

In the town, the population was spread out, with 26.5% under the age of 18, 6.6% from 18 to 24, 21.8% from 25 to 44, 30.1% from 45 to 64, and 14.9% who were 65 years of age or older. The median age was 41 years. For every 100 females, there were 105.2 males. For every 100 females age 18 and over, there were 98.3 males.

The median income for a household in the town was $39,453, and the median income for a family was $40,350. Males had a median income of $31,625 versus $24,083 for females. The per capita income for the town was $15,955. About 7.6% of families and 12.0% of the population were below the poverty line, including 23.1% of those under age 18 and 5.1% of those age 65 or over.

== Communities and locations in the Town of Torrey ==
- Cascade Mills – A hamlet on the banks of Keuka Lake Outlet.
- Dresden – The Village of Dresden on the shore of Lake Seneca and on NY-14.
- Long Point – A projection into Seneca Lake in the southern part of the town.
- Mays Mills – A hamlet on the bank of Keuka Lake Outlet.
- Milo – A location on the western town line in the south of Torrey.
- Perry Point – A projection into Seneca Lake, south of Dresden.
- Ryal Corners – A location northwest of Dresden on NY-14 at Larzellere Road.
- Townsend Corners – A location in the southern part of the town.
