= New York State Route 230 =

Highway in New York

New York State Route 230
- Map of Finger Lakes region in the Southern Tier of New York with NY 230 highlighted in red and NY 961L in blue

Route information
- Maintained by NYSDOT
- Length: 8.94 mi (14.39 km)
- Existed: 1930–present

Major junctions
- West end: NY 54 in Wayne
- East end: NY 14A in Barrington

Location
- Country: United States
- State: New York
- Counties: Steuben, Schuyler, Yates

Highway system
- New York Highways; Interstate; US; State; Reference; Parkways
← NY 229	→ NY 231

New York State Route 230 (NY 230) is a state highway in the Finger Lakes region of New York in the United States. NY 230 is an east–west highway between the eastern edge of Steuben County to the interior of adjacent Yates County. The western terminus of NY 230 is the community of Keuka in the town of Wayne on the edge of Keuka Lake at NY 54. The eastern terminus is at its junction with NY 14A in the town of Barrington, west of the village of Dundee.

== Route description ==
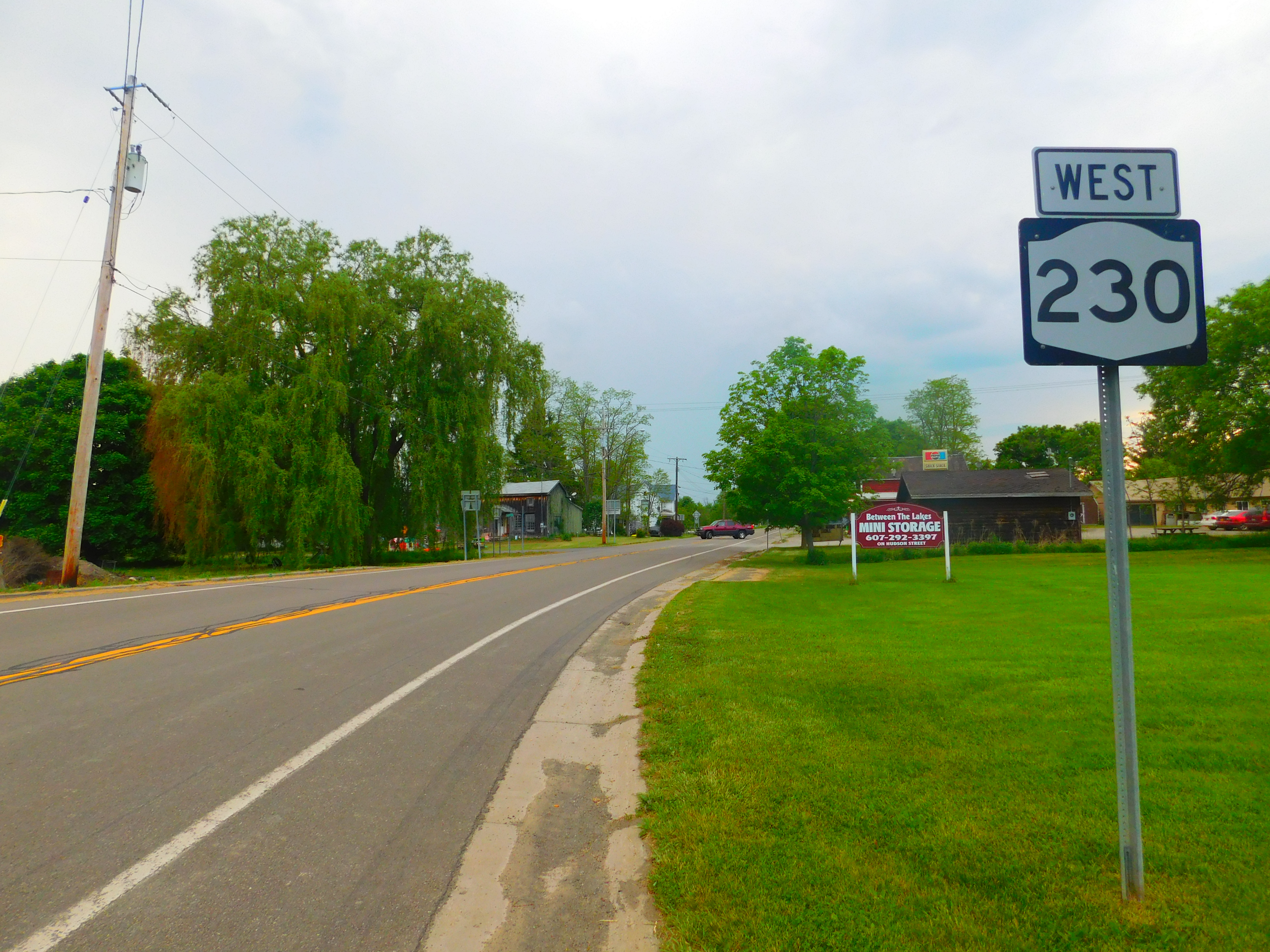
NY 230 west in Wayne after CR 26

NY 230 begins at an intersection with NY 54 in Keuka, a hamlet with the town of Wayne on the eastern shore of Keuka Lake. NY 230 proceeds southbound from NY 54 as a two-lane woods road, bending to the southeast, crossing Keuka Lake Road near the hamlet of Sylvan Beach. The route crosses a creek, and crosses the county line into Schuyler County. In Schuyler County, NY 230 enters the town of Tyrone, passing to the north of Waneta Lake and intersecting with NY 961L and County Route 26 (CR 26; Hammondsport-Wayne Road), which connects NY 230 to the county line (where CR 26 becomes Steuben CR 87). Crossing through the hamlet of Wayne, NY 230 bends northeast, becoming a two-lane rural roadway through Tyrone, crossing the county line once again, now into Yates County. In Yates County, NY 230 enters the town of Barrington.

In Barrington, NY 230 continues northeast, crossing as a two-lane residential street through the hamlet of Crystal Spring. The route returns to its rural background northeast of Crystal Spring, crossing John Green Road and Ray Crosby Road before intersecting with NY 14A in Barrington. NY 230 terminates at this intersection, while NY 14A proceeds eastward towards the village of Dundee.

== History ==
In 1908, the New York State Legislature created Route 13, an unsigned legislative route extending from Bath to Dundee via modern NY 54, County Routes 87 and 88 (CR 87 and CR 88) in Steuben County, and NY 230. On March 1, 1921, Route 13 was reassigned elsewhere in the state as part of a partial renumbering of New York's legislative route system. NY 230, meanwhile, was assigned in the 1930 renumbering of state highways in New York to its current alignment from NY 54A (now NY 54) in Wayne to NY 14A near Dundee. The route was extended eastward along NY 14A and Dundee–Starkey Road to NY 14 east of Dundee c. 1932, but truncated back to NY 14A west of Dundee in the early 1940s. A short spur connecting NY 230 to CR 87 in Tyrone, formerly part of legislative Route 13, is designated as NY 961L, an unsigned reference route.

== Major intersections ==
County	Location	mi	km	Destinations	Notes
Steuben	Wayne	0.00	0.00	NY 54 – Bath, Penn Yan	Western terminus; hamlet of Keuka
Schuyler	Tyrone	1.91	3.07	NY 961L (Lake Road)	Northern terminus of unsigned NY 961L; former routing of NY 230; hamlet of Wayne
Yates	Barrington	8.94	14.39	NY 14A – Penn Yan, Dundee, Watkins Glen	Eastern terminus
1.000 mi = 1.609 km; 1.000 km = 0.621 mi
