= New York State Route 14A =

Highway in New York

New York State Route 14A
- NY 14A highlighted in red; unsigned NY 962C highlighted in blue

Route information
- Auxiliary route of NY 14
- Maintained by NYSDOT
- Length: 35.99 mi (57.92 km)
- Existed: 1930–present

Major junctions
- South end: NY 14 in Reading
- North end: US 20 / NY 5 / NY 245 in Geneva

Location
- Country: United States
- State: New York
- Counties: Schuyler, Yates, Ontario

Highway system
- New York Highways; Interstate; US; State; Reference; Parkways
← NY 14	→ US 15

New York State Route 14A (NY 14A) is a north–south state highway located in the Finger Lakes region of New York in the United States. It extends for 35.99 miles (57.92 km) from an interchange with NY 14 in the Schuyler County town of Reading to an intersection with U.S. Route 20 (US 20) and NY 5 west of the Ontario County city of Geneva. In between, the two-lane route serves Yates County and the village of Penn Yan, located at the northeastern tip of Keuka Lake. Outside of Penn Yan, NY 14A traverses rural, rolling terrain dominated by farmland.

The route runs parallel to and west of NY 14 for its entire route between the Watkins Glen and Geneva areas. During the 1920s, NY 14A was part of NY 14, which originally served Dundee and Penn Yan on its way from Watkins Glen to Geneva. NY 14 was moved onto its current routing alongside Seneca Lake as part of the 1930 renumbering of state highways in New York, at which time the old inland alignment became NY 14A.

== Route description ==
NY 14A begins at an interchange with NY 14 at Gabriel's Junction, a hamlet 4 miles (6 km) north of Watkins Glen in the town of Reading. The route heads to the northwest, passing under the Norfolk Southern Railway's Corning Secondary as it runs up the side of a hill. At the underpass, NY 14A for the next 10 miles (16 km) becomes the US Army Specialist Christopher J. Scott Memorial Highway. After 1 mile (1.6 km), the highway takes on a more northerly routing, passing by several farms as it proceeds through Reading Center and toward the Yates County line. In one short stretch north of Reading Center, the highway crosses into Yates County, reenters Schuyler County, and heads back into Yates County. While in Schuyler County for the second time, it meets with the northern terminus of NY 226.

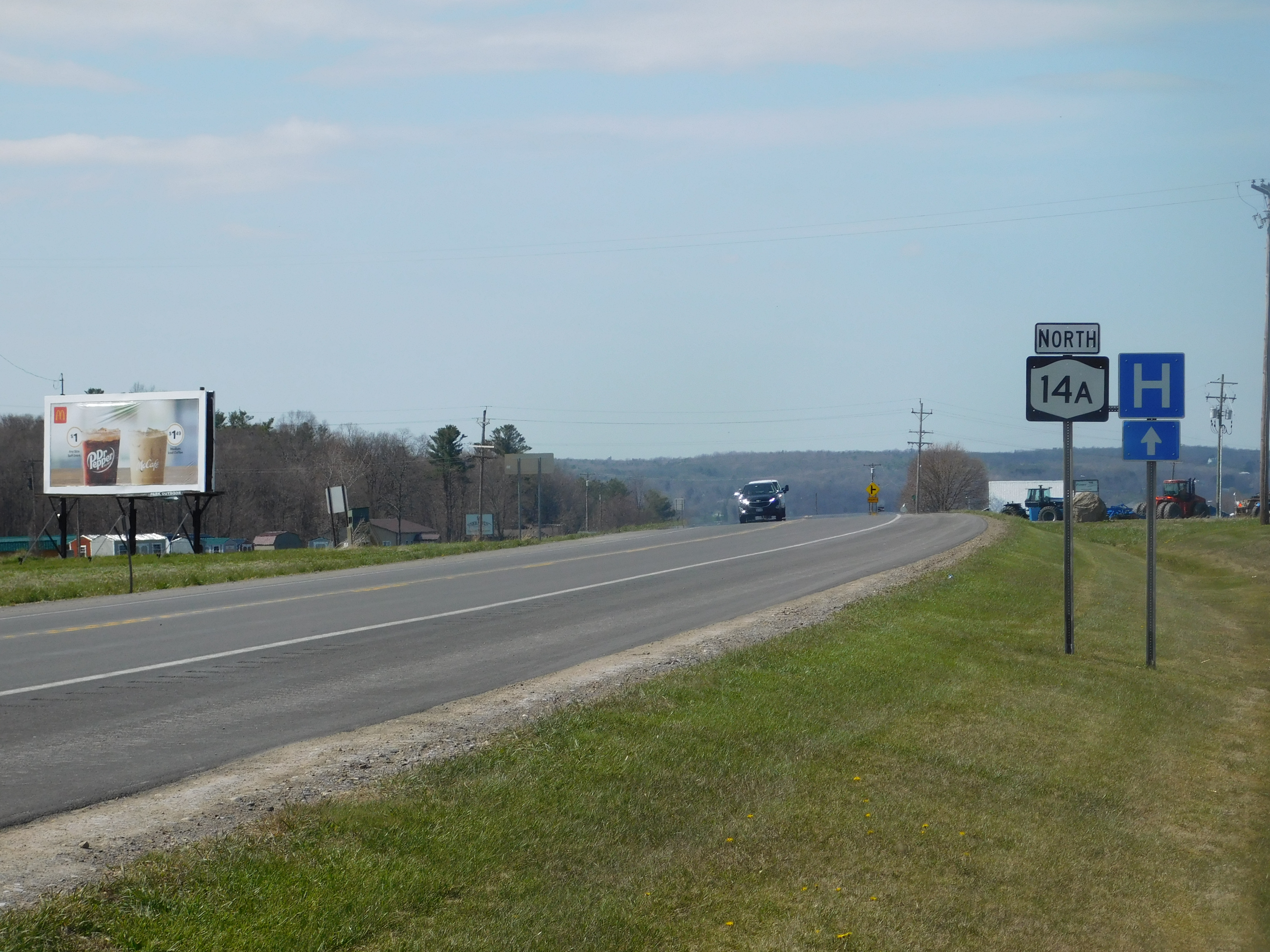
NY 14A northbound in Milo

Once it reenters Yates County, NY 14A runs due north across the town of Starkey to the village of Dundee, where it is known first as Main Street. Main Street becomes Water Street at the main intersection in Dundee, where it meets Union and Seneca Streets. At the north end of the village, it turns west on Millard Street at a junction near the Dundee Central School. NY 14A remains on Millard Street to the western village line, where it intersects Pre-Emption Road. This north–south highway marks the Preemption Line that divided the Iroquois lands of western New York awarded to New York from those awarded to Massachusetts by the Treaty of Hartford of 1786. Just west of Dundee, NY 14A meets with the eastern terminus of NY 230 as well as the terminus of the Christopher J. Scott Memorial Highway.

From here, the route turns north and runs along the farmland-covered ridge between Seneca and Keuka Lakes, which features a thriving Mennonite community. The highway passes through the town of Milo, serving the small hamlet of Second Milo and the Penn Yan Airport before descending the ridge into Penn Yan, a village at the northeast end of Keuka Lake. It follows Brown and Liberty Streets in the village, sharing the road with NY 54 between Lake and Elm Streets. At the Elm Street intersection, located in Penn Yan's central business district, NY 54A ends at NY 14A and NY 54—completing its alternate loop of the latter—while NY 54 leaves NY 14A to follow Elm Street out of the village. NY 14A continues on Liberty Street through the northern part of the village, where it meets the southern terminus of NY 364 at a junction adjacent to the Penn Yan Central School District's campus.

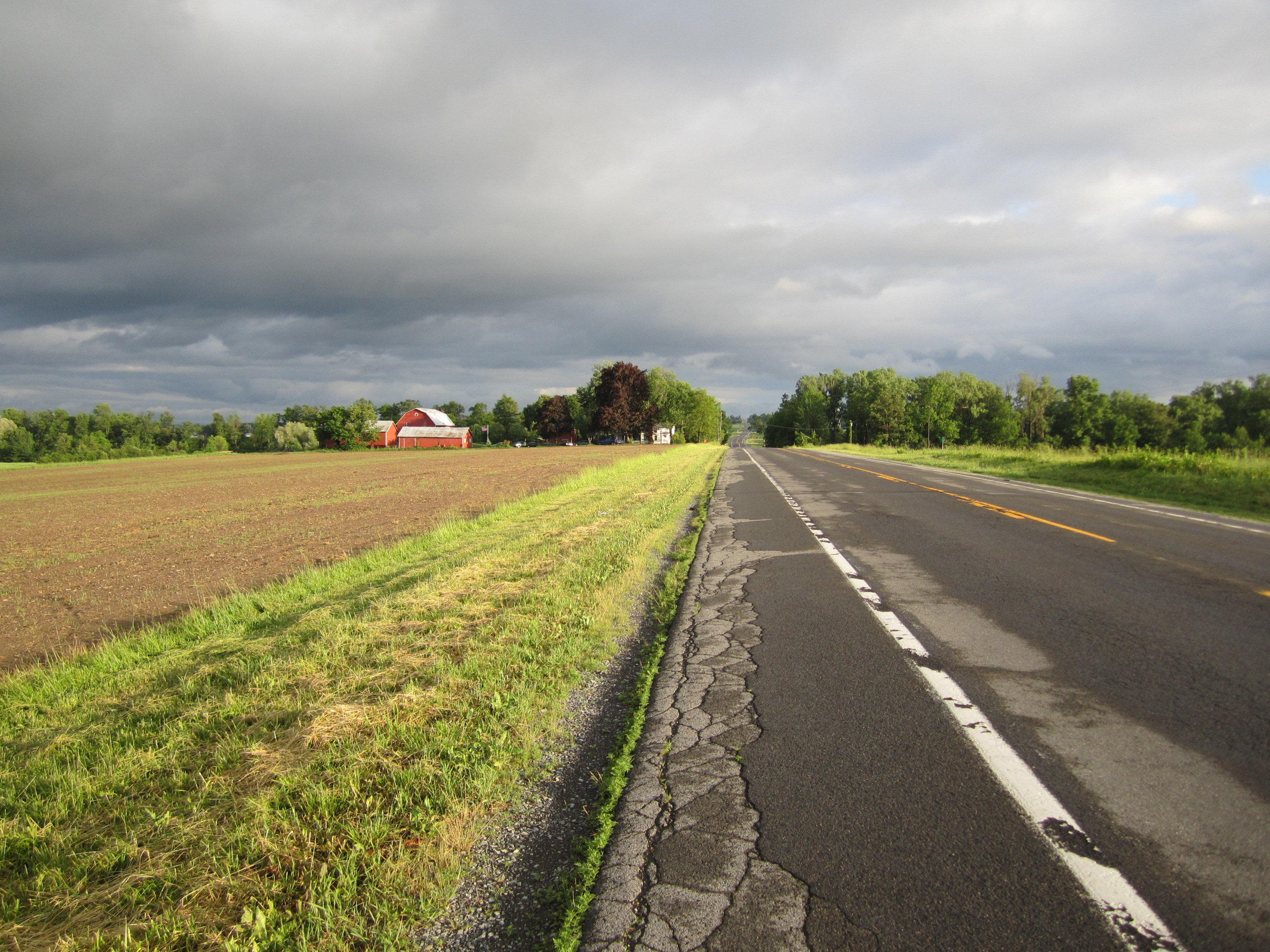
NY 14A looking south, Yates County in background.

North of Penn Yan, NY 14A enters the town of Benton, where it heads due north past several farms on the hilltop north of Keuka Lake. It goes through the hamlet of Benton Center before quietly passing into the Ontario County town of Seneca. In the hamlet of Hall, located 2 miles (3.2 km) north of the county line, NY 14A turns northeast, at which point the due north–south highway becomes County Route 5. NY 14A continues in a general northeasterly direction as it winds its way toward the city of Geneva. Midway between Hall and Geneva, the route picks up NY 245 just before it crosses Wilson Creek, a small stream feeding into Seneca Lake. NY 14A and NY 245 continue northeastward across farmland into the town of Geneva, where both routes terminate at a junction with US 20 and NY 5 just west of the Geneva city limits in a commercialized area known as Lenox Park.

== History ==
In 1908, the New York State Legislature created Route 12, an unsigned legislative route extending from Horseheads to Lyons via Watkins Glen, Penn Yan, and Geneva. When the first set of posted routes in New York were assigned in 1924, all of legislative Route 12 became part of NY 14, which extended south to Elmira and north to Sodus Point. NY 14 was realigned as part of the 1930 renumbering of state highways in New York to follow a new highway along Seneca Lake between Reading and Geneva. Its former routing via Penn Yan was redesignated as NY 14A. In Penn Yan, NY 14A once followed Main Street, located one block to the east of its current routing. The old route passes through the main downtown area and by the Yates County Fairgrounds. This alignment of NY 14A merged into the current route north of Penn Yan and used what is now Old Route 14A to reach modern NY 14A southeast of the village.

== Major intersections ==
County	Location	mi	km	Destinations	Notes
Schuyler	Reading	0.00	0.00	NY 14 south – Watkins Glen	Southern terminus; interchange; southbound access only
Schuyler	Reading	0.60	0.97	To NY 14 north – Geneva via NY 962C	Southern terminus of unsigned NY 962C
Schuyler	Reading	5.17	8.32	NY 226 south – Savona	Northern terminus of NY 226
Yates	Barrington	11.05	17.78	NY 230 west	Eastern terminus of NY 230
Yates	Penn Yan	20.65	33.23	NY 54 south – Penn Yan Airport	Southern terminus of NY 14A / NY 54 overlap
Yates	Penn Yan	20.90	33.64	NY 54 north / NY 54A south	Northern terminus of NY 14A / NY 54 overlap; northern terminus of NY 54A
Yates	Penn Yan	21.60	34.76	NY 364 west (Maple Avenue)	Eastern terminus of NY 364
Ontario	Seneca	32.89	52.93	NY 245 south – Naples	Southern terminus of NY 14A / NY 245 overlap
Ontario	Town of Geneva	35.99	57.92	US 20 / NY 5 / NY 245 south	Northern terminus, northern terminus of NY 14A / NY 245 overlap; northern terminus of NY 245
1.000 mi = 1.609 km; 1.000 km = 0.621 mi: Concurrency terminus; Incomplete access
