= Timothy M. Younglove Octagon House =

Historic house in New York, United States

- U.S. National Register of Historic Places
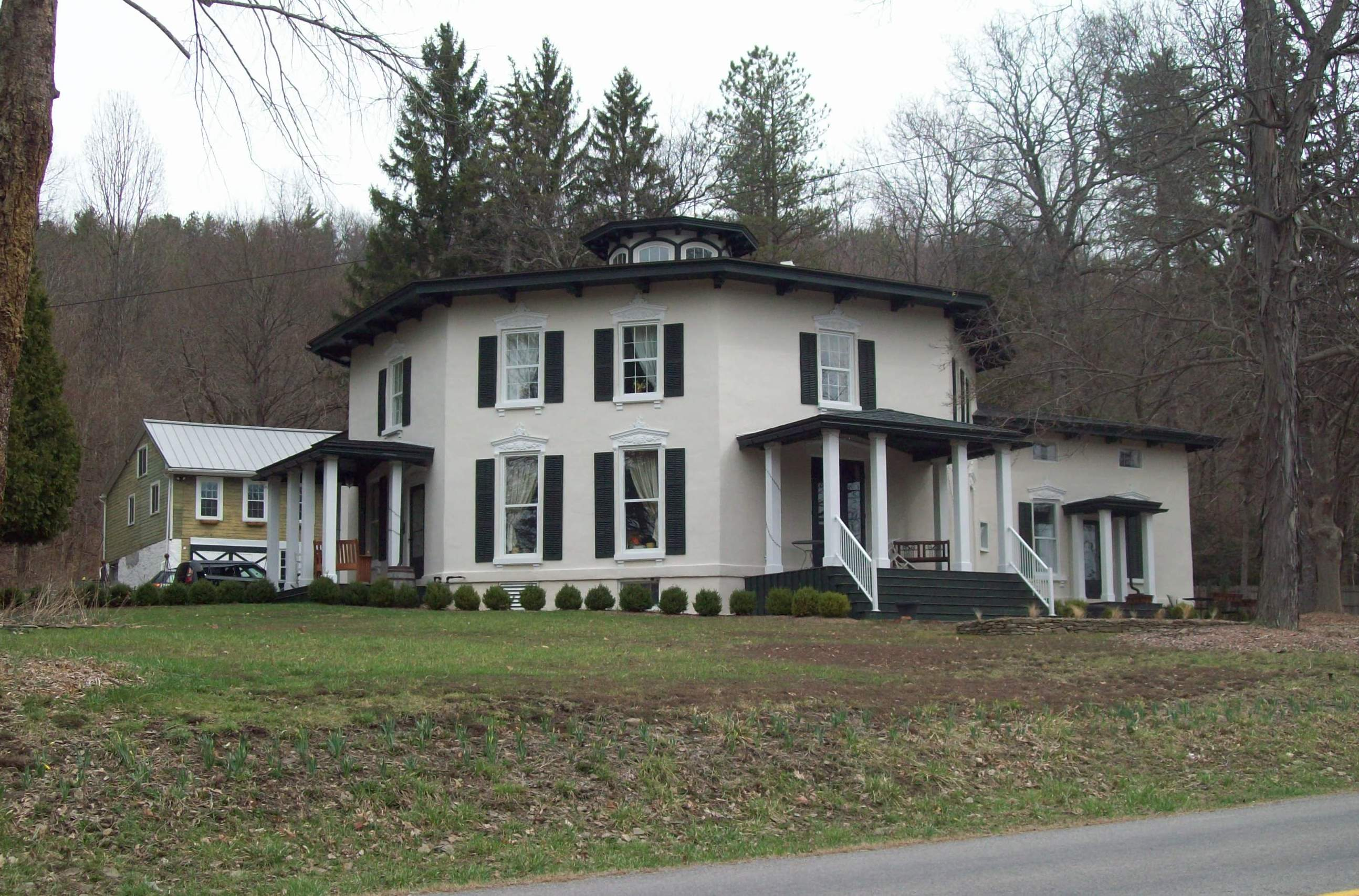
- Timothy M. Younglove Octagon House, April 2011

- Location within New York Location within the United States
- Location: 8329 Pleasant Valley Road, Urbana, New York
- Coordinates: 42°24′17″N 77°14′37″W
- Built: 1859
- Architectural style: Octagon Mode
- NRHP reference No.: 02000877
- Added to NRHP: August 22, 2002

The Timothy M. Younglove Octagon House built in 1859 is an historic octagonal house located at 8329 Pleasant Valley Road in the town of Urbana near Hammondsport, New York. It was built by land surveyor Timothy Meigs Younglove, who surveyed Hammondport when it was incorporated.

In 2002, it was added to the National Register of Historic Places. It is now the Black Sheep Inn.
