= Oakcliff =

Historic house in New York, United States

- U.S. National Register of Historic Places
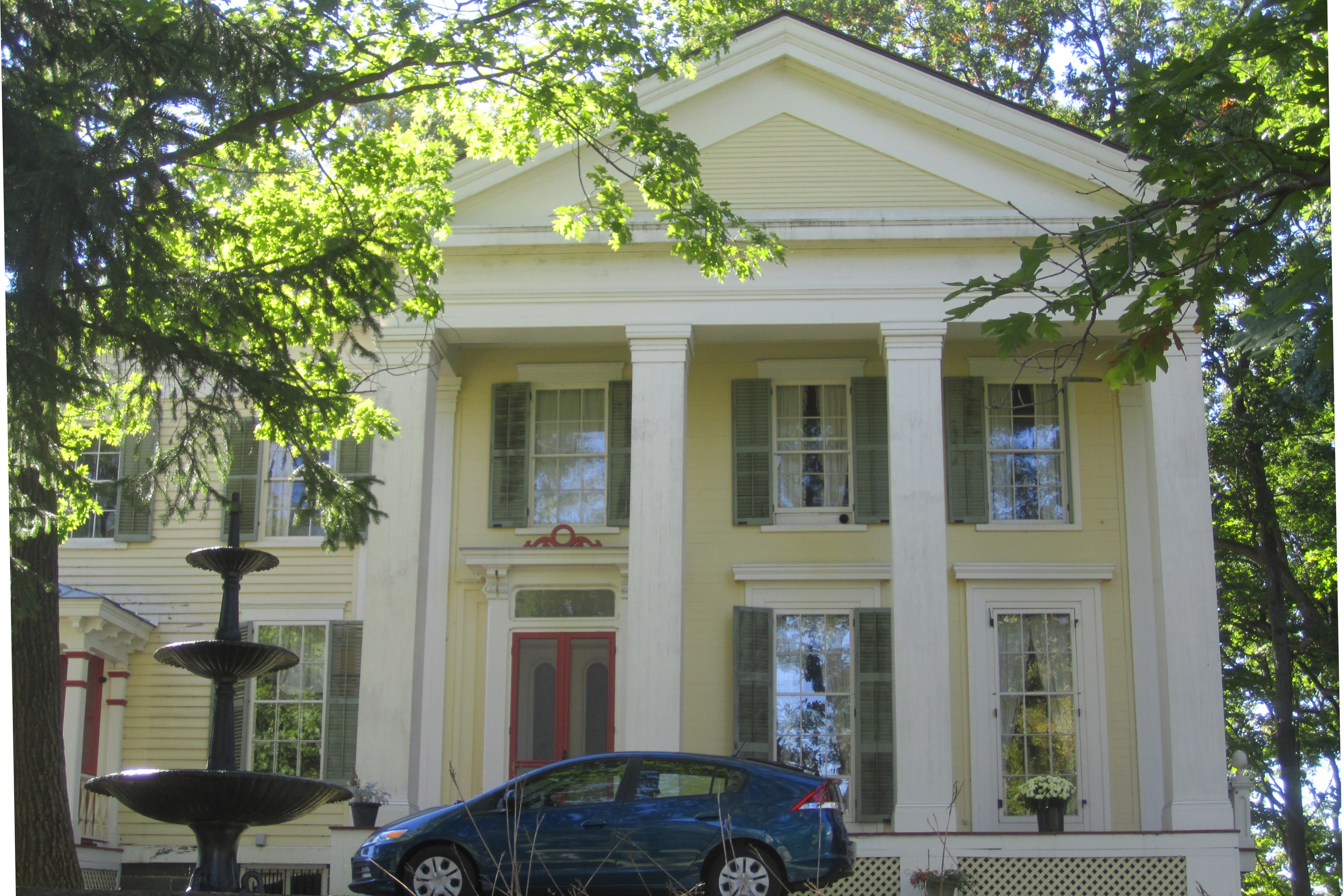
- "Oakcliff" in 2013

- Location within New York Location within the United States
- Location: 78 Church Hill Road, Crescent, New York
- Coordinates: 42°49′28″N 73°43′49″W
- Area: 1.4 acres (0.57 ha)
- Built: 1840
- Architectural style: Greek Revival
- NRHP reference No.: 98000548
- Added to NRHP: June 1, 1998

Oakcliff is a historic home located on Church Hill Road in Crescent, New York, in Saratoga County. It was built about 1840 and is a two-story, three-bay, timber framed, side hall residence in a formally balanced Greek Revival style. Renovations occurred in the late 1860s and late 1890s. It has a two-story side wing and features two-story porticos with four Tuscan order columns on each with full entablature and a molded triangular pediment. Also on the property are a contributing frame carriage barn and stone wall.

It was added to the National Register of Historic Places in 1998.
