= New York State Route 54 =

Highway in New York

New York State Route 54
- Map of Finger Lakes region in New York with NY 54 highlighted in red

Route information
- Maintained by NYSDOT and the village of Penn Yan
- Length: 34.34 mi (55.26 km)
- Existed: 1930–present

Major junctions
- South end: I-86 / NY 17 / Southern Tier Expressway / NY 415 in Bath
- NY 14A in Penn Yan
- North end: NY 14 in Dresden

Location
- Country: United States
- State: New York
- Counties: Steuben, Yates

Highway system
- New York Highways; Interstate; US; State; Reference; Parkways
← NY 53	→ NY 54A

New York State Route 54 (NY 54) is a state highway in the Finger Lakes region of New York in the United States. The southern terminus of the route is at an interchange with the Southern Tier Expressway (Interstate 86 and NY 17) in the village of Bath in Steuben County. Its northern terminus is at an intersection with NY 14 in the village of Dresden in Yates County. The section of NY 54 from Penn Yan to Dresden is signed as east–west. NY 54 serves as the eastern lakeside road along Keuka Lake. NY 54A, NY 54's alternate route between Hammondsport and Penn Yan, runs along the western and northern lakeshore.

== Route description ==
=== Steuben County ===
NY 54 begins at the ramps from interchange 38 with the Southern Tier Expressway (I-86 / NY 17) in the village of Bath, located in town of the same name. A state-maintained continuation of West Washington Street, NY 54 bends to the southeast and under the expressway, crossing over the former Erie Railroad Rochester Division before entering downtown Bath. At the intersection with NY 415 (West Morris Street), the two routes form a concurrency east on West Washington Street. The concurrency begins as a two-lane commercial street, but switches to residential after Cook Street, passing south of Haverling High School. At the junction with Liberty Street, NY 415 turns south along Liberty, while NY 54 turns north. Two blocks after the fork from NY 415, NY 54 intersects with County Route 13 (CR 13; Haverling Street), with the former forking to the northeast along Geneva Street. Crossing northeast along Geneva, NY 54 remains a two-lane residential roadway, passing the Haverling Heights neighborhood to the east before leaving the village of Bath, but remaining in the town of Bath.

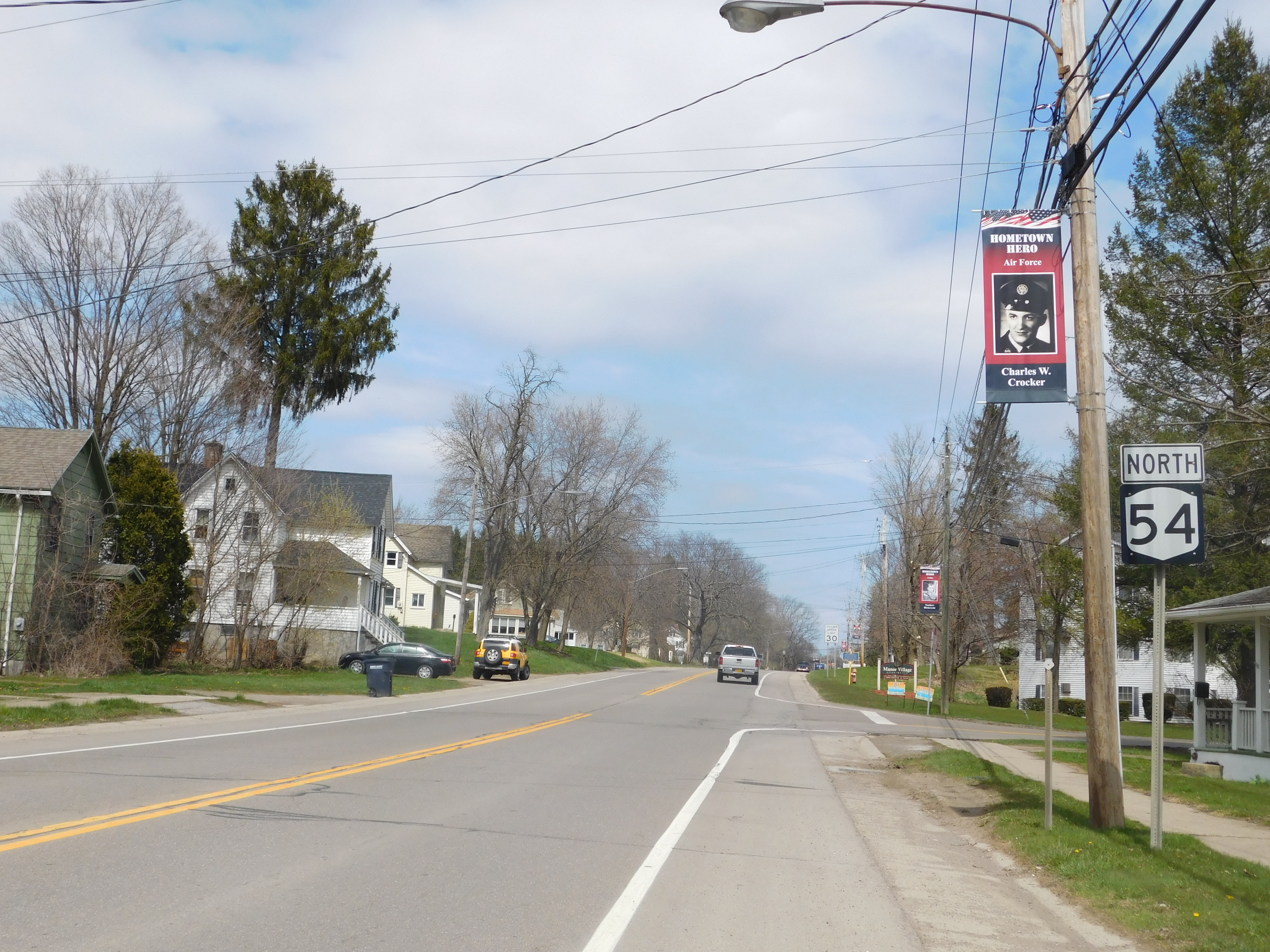
NY 54 north from the junction with NY 415 in Bath

Now outside of the village of Bath, NY 54 drops the Geneva Street moniker, becoming a two-lane rural roadway and intersecting with CR 113 (Mount Washington–Argus Hill Road). After CR 113, NY 54 crosses south of a large industrial complex and a local fish hatchery, crossing a local railroad line into a number of residences. Paralleling the railroad to the northeast, NY 54 leaves the town of Bath for the town of Urbana. Through Urbana, NY 54 continues as a mix of rural and residential roadway, intersecting with CR 89 (Hammondsport–Pleasant Valley Road) at-grade. NY 54 bends eastward, passing south of a local cemetery, becoming a two-lane industrial road until the intersection with NY 54A (Main Street Extension) just south of the village line of Hammondsport.

NY 54 continues east through Urbana, crossing the southern end of Keuka Lake, one of New York's Finger Lakes. At this point, NY 54 becomes a lakeside highway, intersecting with CR 87 (Hammondsport–Wayne Road). NY 54 begins a bend to the north along Keuka Lake, as a two-lane rural highway overlooking the lake. To the west, Lake Road parallels NY 54 on the lakeshore and is a residential street. This pattern continues to the northeast for several miles, leaving Urbana for the town of Wayne, where the two roads both become residential, and enter the hamlet of Grove Springs. In Grove Springs, Lake Road merges into NY 54, which becomes the lakeside roadway along Keuka Lake, merging at-grade with CR 94 (Grove Springs Road). NY 54 bends eastward, intersecting with CR 95 (Day Road) and soon an interchange with NY 230, which forms a large junction to the southbound roadway. NY 54 continues east of NY 230, paralleling Keuka Village Road north along the lakeside, crossing the county line from Steuben County into Yates County.

=== Yates County ===
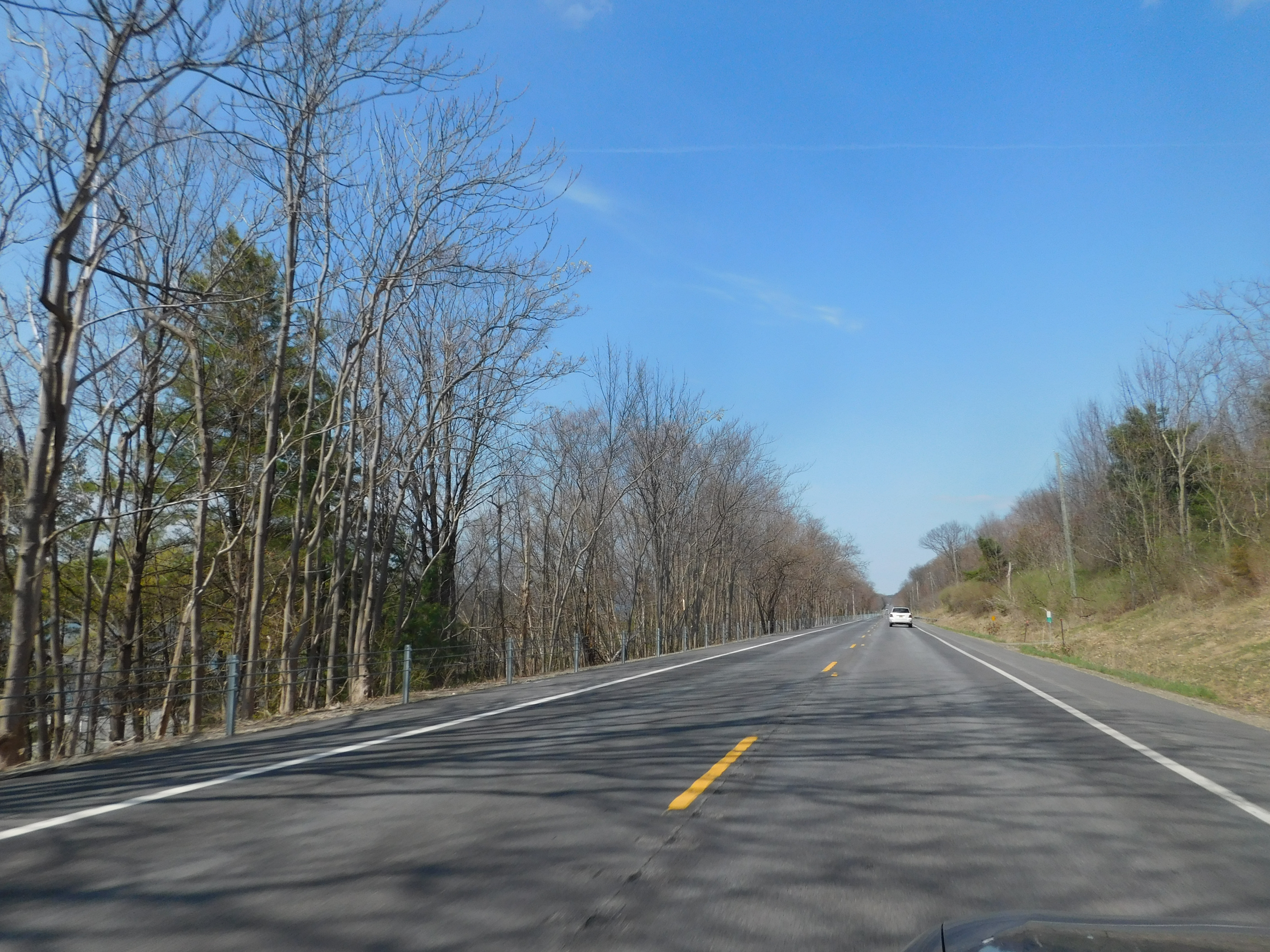
NY 54 northbound in Milo

In Yates County, NY 54 enters the town of Barrington, where Keuka Village Road soon merges in. NY 54 continues north as East Lake Road, paralleling the lakeside as a two-lane residential street before forking northward as a two-lane rural roadway. A second East Lake Road serves as the local residential highway for a short distance, until the hamlet of Crosby. In Crosby, NY 54 becomes a two-lane residential street until the intersection with Gray Road. There, East Lake Road continues a new parallel once again. A short distance later, NY 54 crosses the town line from Barrington into Milo. At the town line, the western East Lake Road changes name to Lower East Lake Road, continuing its lakeside parallel of NY 54. Entering the hamlet of Willow Grove, this merges into NY 54 once again, which soon intersects with the western terminus of CR 30 (Second Milo Road).

NY 54 continues northward along East Lake Road, moving away from the shore of Keuka Lake for a short distance. Passing the Lakeside Country Club in Milo, the route bends to the northeast and returns to the lakeside. A short distance after the curve, NY 54 intersects with CR 17 (Bath Road), which connects to a local airport. At this junction, NY 54 enters the village of Penn Yan, where it gains the moniker of Lake Street. Bending northward, the route becomes residential, soon turning to the northeast into downtown as a two-lane commercial street. Within the village, NY 54 continues northeast along Lake, although farther away from Keuka Lake, intersecting with NY 14A (Liberty Street / Brown Street). Paralleling an outlet, NY 54 continues northeast, intersecting with East Main Street, where NY 54 turns north onto West Main Street as the Lake Street right-of-way terminates.

NY 54 continues north through Penn Yan on West Main Street, crossing the outlet into the Kenka Mills section. Within Kenka Mills, NY 54 remains a two-lane commercial street, intersecting with the northern terminus of its child route, NY 54A (Elm Street). NY 54 continues north along Main Street until the intersection with Clinton Street, where it turns east, crossing a local railroad before leaving downtown Penn Yan as a two-lane residential street. After crossing northeast through Penn Yan, NY 54 intersects with North Avenue (former CR 20). Just after this junction, NY 54 enters the town of Benton. Within Benton, NY 54 becomes a rural two-lane roadway, intersecting with the southern terminus of CR 15 (Pre-Emption Road) before crossing into the town of Torrey. After entering Torrey, NY 54 intersects with CR 9 (Ridge Road).

Continuing east through Torrey, NY 54 becomes a two-lane rural roadway, passing sporadic residences. A short distance after the intersection with Roy Road, NY 54 intersects with Spur Road, which connects NY 54 to NY 14 further north. NY 54 continues east as a two-lane rural roadway, intersecting with NY 14. This intersection with NY 14 serves as the northern terminus of NY 54. The right-of-way continues eastward as Main Street, entering the village of Dresden towards Seneca Lake.

== History ==
In 1908, the New York State Legislature created Route 13, an unsigned legislative route extending from Bath to Dundee via Hammondsport. The section of legislative Route 13 southwest of Hammondsport was first assigned a posted route designation in the mid-1920s when it was included as part of NY 38. Past Hammondsport, NY 38 continued to Penn Yan by way of the western and northern shores of Keuka Lake. In the 1930 renumbering of state highways in New York, the Bath–Penn Yan segment of NY 38 became part of the new NY 54, which also extended east from Penn Yan to Dresden. At the same time, an alternate route of NY 54 along the eastern edge of Keuka Lake was designated as NY 54A.

NY 54 initially entered Hammondsport on Fish Hatchery Road and Lake Street. In the late 1930s, work began on a new alignment for NY 54 between Bath and the southern tip of Keuka Lake that bypassed Hammondsport to the south. The portion of the highway that bypassed Fish Hatchery Road was completed c. 1939 while the remainder was opened to traffic in the early 1940s. Following the completion of the new alignment, the routings of NY 54 and NY 54A between Hammondsport and Penn Yan were flipped, placing NY 54 on the eastern lakeside roadway and NY 54A on the western and northern highway around Keuka Lake. NY 54 was extended a short distance westward on July 1, 1974 to meet the new Southern Tier Expressway at exit 38.

== Major intersections ==
County	Location	mi	km	Destinations	Notes
Steuben	Village of Bath	0.00	0.00	I-86 / NY 17 / Southern Tier Expressway – Binghamton, Jamestown	Southern terminus; exit 38 on I-86
Steuben	Village of Bath	0.55	0.89	NY 415 north (Morris Street)	South end of NY 415 overlap
Steuben	Village of Bath	1.30	2.09	NY 415 south (Liberty Street)	North end of NY 415 overlap
Steuben	Urbana	8.10	13.04	NY 54A north (Main Street) – Hammondsport	Southern terminus of NY 54A
Steuben	Wayne	16.44	26.46	NY 230 east – Wayne	Western terminus of NY 230
Yates	Penn Yan	28.82	46.38	NY 14A south (Brown Street)	South end of NY 14A overlap
Yates	Penn Yan	29.07	46.78	NY 14A north / NY 54A south (Elm Street)	North end of NY 14A overlap; northern terminus of NY 54A
Yates	Torrey	33.94	54.62	To NY 14 north	Access via NY 961H
Yates	Dresden	34.34	55.26	NY 14	Northern terminus
1.000 mi = 1.609 km; 1.000 km = 0.621 mi: Concurrency terminus

== NY 54A ==

NY 54A is a 22.46-mile-long (36.15 km) alternate route of NY 54 between Hammondsport and Penn Yan along the western edge of Keuka Lake. It was assigned as part of the 1930 renumbering of state highways in New York.

=== Major intersections ===
County	Location	mi	km	Destinations	Notes
Steuben	Urbana	0.00	0.00	NY 54 – Penn Yan, Bath	Southern terminus
Yates	Penn Yan	22.46	36.15	NY 14A (Liberty Street) / NY 54 (Brown Street)	Northern terminus
1.000 mi = 1.609 km; 1.000 km = 0.621 mi
