= Starkey, New York =

Starkey
- Town
- Location in Yates County and the state of New York.
- Coordinates: 42°31′12″N 76°56′55″W
- Country: United States
- State: New York
- County: Yates

Area
  - Total: 39.20 sq mi (101.54 km^{2})
  - Land: 32.83 sq mi (85.03 km^{2})
  - Water: 6.37 sq mi (16.51 km^{2})
- Elevation: 1,142 ft (348 m)

Population (2010)
  - Total: 3,573
  - Estimate (2016): 3,484
  - Density: 106.1/sq mi (40.97/km^{2})
- Time zone: UTC-5 (Eastern (EST))
  - Summer (DST): UTC-4 (EDT)
- FIPS code: 36-70816
- GNIS feature ID: 0979521
- Website: https://www.starkeyny.gov/

Starkey is a town in Yates County, New York, United States. The population was 3,573 at the 2010 census. The town is in the southeastern section of the county and is south of Geneva.

== History ==
Starkey may have been settled around 1798, but a scouting party of the Sullivan Expedition of 1779, found an occupied cabin north of Glenora.

The town became part of the county in 1824, the year after Yates County was created, and was formed from the town of Reading (in Schuyler County).

The Thomas Bennett Curtis House, William Swortz House, Crescent Methodist Episcopal Church, John Noyes House, Starkey United Methodist Church, Daniel Supplee Cobblestone Farmhouse, and Dr. Henry Spence Cobblestone Farmhouse and Barn Complex are listed on the National Register of Historic Places.

== Geography ==
According to the United States Census Bureau, the town has a total area of 39.3 square miles (102 km^{2}), of which 32.8 square miles (85 km^{2}) is land and 6.4 square miles (17 km^{2}) (16.40%) is water.

The southern town line and part of the eastern town boundary are the border of Schuyler County, and the remainder of the eastern town line, marked by Seneca Lake, is the border of Seneca County. Starkey is in the Finger Lakes Region of New York.

New York State Route 14 and New York State Route 14A are major north–south highways.

== Demographics ==
Historical population
| Census | Pop. | Note | %± |
|---|---|---|---|
| 1830 | 2,285 | | — |
| 1840 | 2,426 | | 6.2% |
| 1850 | 2,675 | | 10.3% |
| 1860 | 2,542 | | −5.0% |
| 1870 | 2,370 | | −6.8% |
| 1880 | 2,729 | | 15.1% |
| 1890 | 2,862 | | 4.9% |
| 1900 | 2,836 | | −0.9% |
| 1910 | 2,538 | | −10.5% |
| 1920 | 2,382 | | −6.1% |
| 1930 | 2,237 | | −6.1% |
| 1940 | 2,205 | | −1.4% |
| 1950 | 2,345 | | 6.3% |
| 1960 | 2,597 | | 10.7% |
| 1970 | 2,783 | | 7.2% |
| 1980 | 2,868 | | 3.1% |
| 1990 | 3,173 | | 10.6% |
| 2000 | 3,465 | | 9.2% |
| 2010 | 3,573 | | 3.1% |
| 2016 (est.) | 3,484 | | −2.5% |
U.S. Decennial Census

As of the census of 2000, there were 3,465 people, 1,243 households, and 856 families residing in the town. The population density was 105.5 inhabitants per square mile (40.7/km^{2}). There were 1,624 housing units at an average density of 49.5 per square mile (19.1/km^{2}). The racial makeup of the town was 97.03% White, 1.15% African American, 0.09% Native American, 0.46% Asian, 0.40% from other races, and 0.87% from two or more races. Hispanic or Latino of any race were 1.36% of the population.

There were 1,243 households, out of which 34.0% had children under the age of 18 living with them, 52.9% were married couples living together, 11.9% had a female householder with no husband present, and 31.1% were non-families. 24.9% of all households were made up of individuals, and 12.0% had someone living alone who was 65 years of age or older. The average household size was 2.64 and the average family size was 3.12.

In the town, the population was spread out, with 30.2% under the age of 18, 7.6% from 18 to 24, 24.6% from 25 to 44, 21.9% from 45 to 64, and 15.8% who were 65 years of age or older. The median age was 36 years. For every 100 females, there were 95.2 males. For every 100 females age 18 and over, there were 93.4 males.

The median income for a household in the town was $29,337, and the median income for a family was $34,453. Males had a median income of $28,750 versus $20,583 for females. The per capita income for the town was $14,861. About 13.6% of families and 19.3% of the population were below the poverty line, including 29.9% of those under age 18 and 9.0% of those age 65 or over.

== Communities and locations in the Town of Starkey ==
- Barnes Station – A location near the southern town line, west of Rock Stream.
- Big Stream – An important stream in the county that furnished water power to early settlers. It flows eastward into Seneca Lake.
- Dundee – A village on NY-14A in the western part of the town.
- Dundee Airport (D48) – A general aviation airport north of Dundee.
- Eddytown – An historical location north of Glenora where an early settler, William Eddy pioneered settlement of the area.
- Glenora – A hamlet in the southeastern part of the town.
- Lakemont – A hamlet south of Starkey hamlet.
- Rock Stream – A location near the southern town line and the name of a stream in the southern part of Starkey.
- Shannon Corners – A location northeast of Dundee village.
- Starkey – A hamlet east of Dundee at NY-14.
