= Urbana, New York =

- Town
- Location within the state of New York
- Coordinates: 42°24′32″N 77°14′1″W
- Country: United States
- State: New York
- County: Steuben

Area
  - Total: 44.18 sq mi (114.42 km^{2})
  - Land: 40.95 sq mi (106.05 km^{2})
  - Water: 3.23 sq mi (8.37 km^{2})
- Elevation: 833 ft (254 m)

Population (2020)
  - Total: 2,125 ▼
  - Estimate (2021): 2,101
  - Density: 55.6/sq mi (21.46/km^{2})
- Time zone: UTC-5 (Eastern (EST))
  - Summer (DST): UTC-4 (EDT)
- FIPS code: 36-76496
- GNIS feature ID: 0979574
- Website: https://townofurbana.gov/

Urbana is a town in Steuben County, New York, United States. The population was 2,125 at the 2020 census.

The Town of Urbana is in the northeastern part of the county and is northeast of Bath.

== History ==
The town was first settled around 1793. The town was formed from part of the Town of Bath in 1822. The first grape vines were planted around 1829, beginning the modern prominence of the wine industry.

The town and its village, Hammondsport, is one of the cradles of aviation, due to the inventions of Glenn Curtiss.

The Timothy M. Younglove Octagon House is listed on the National Register of Historic Places.

== Geography ==
According to the United States Census Bureau, the town has a total area of 44.2 square miles (114 km^{2}), of which 41.1 square miles (106 km^{2}) is land and 3.0 square miles (7.8 km^{2}) (6.86%) is water.

The town is at the southern end of Keuka Lake, one of the Finger Lakes.

New York State Route 54A rejoins New York State Route 54 near Hammondsport.

== Demographics ==
Historical population
Census	Pop.	Note	%±
1830	1,288		—
1840	1,884		46.3%
1850	2,079		10.4%
1860	1,983		−4.6%
1870	2,082		5.0%
1880	2,318		11.3%
1890	2,590		11.7%
1900	2,692		3.9%
1910	2,659		−1.2%
1920	2,300		−13.5%
1930	2,108		−8.3%
1940	2,322		10.2%
1950	2,450		5.5%
1960	2,592		5.8%
1970	2,694		3.9%
1980	2,982		10.7%
1990	2,807		−5.9%
2000	2,548		−9.2%
2010	2,343		−8.0%
2020	2,125		−9.3%
2021 (est.)	2,101		−1.1%
U.S. Decennial Census

As of the census of 2000, there were 2,546 people, 1,028 households, and 688 families residing in the town. The population density was 61.9 people per square mile (23.9 people/km^{2}). There were 1,434 housing units at an average density of 34.9 per square mile (13.5/km^{2}). The racial makeup of the town was 97.53% White, 0.75% African American, 0.16% Native American, 0.55% Asian, 0.16% from other races, and 0.86% from two or more races. Hispanic or Latino of any race were 0.35% of the population.

There were 1,028 households, out of which 26.8% had children under the age of 18 living with them, 53.9% were married couples living together, 9.0% had a female householder with no husband present, and 33.0% were non-families. 27.2% of all households were made up of individuals, and 10.3% had someone living alone who was 65 years of age or older. The average household size was 2.36 and the average family size was 2.83.

In the town, the population was spread out, with 21.8% under the age of 18, 4.9% from 18 to 24, 24.0% from 25 to 44, 28.9% from 45 to 64, and 20.3% who were 65 years of age or older. The median age was 44 years. For every 100 females, there were 94.1 males. For every 100 females age 18 and over, there were 92.1 males.

The median income for a household in the town was $39,184, and the median income for a family was $43,309. Males had a median income of $32,500 versus $26,528 for females. The per capita income for the town was $19,584. About 8.0% of families and 9.8% of the population were below the poverty line, including 16.1% of those under age 18 and 4.3% of those age 65 or over.

== Communities and locations in the Town of Urbana ==
- Cold Springs – A hamlet in the south part of the town, southwest of Hermitage.
- Glen Grove – A hamlet on the shore of Keuka Lake, south of Urbana Hamlet on NY-54A.
- Hammondsport – The Village of Hammondsport is at the south end of Keuka Lake, located on NY-54A north of its junction with NY-54.
- Hermitage – A hamlet in the southwest part of the town.
- Mitchellsville – A hamlet at the west town line on County Road 13.
- North Urbana – A hamlet on the east town line.
- Pleasant Valley – A hamlet south of Rheims, located on County Road 88.
- Rheims – A hamlet west of Hammondsport. The Pleasant Valley Wine Company was listed on the National Register of Historic Places in 1980.
- Urbana – The hamlet of Urbana is in the northeast part of the town on the shore of Keuka Lake and NY-54A. The Timothy M. Younglove Octagon House was listed on the National Register of Historic Places in 2002.
