= Crescent, New York =

Crescent
- hamlet
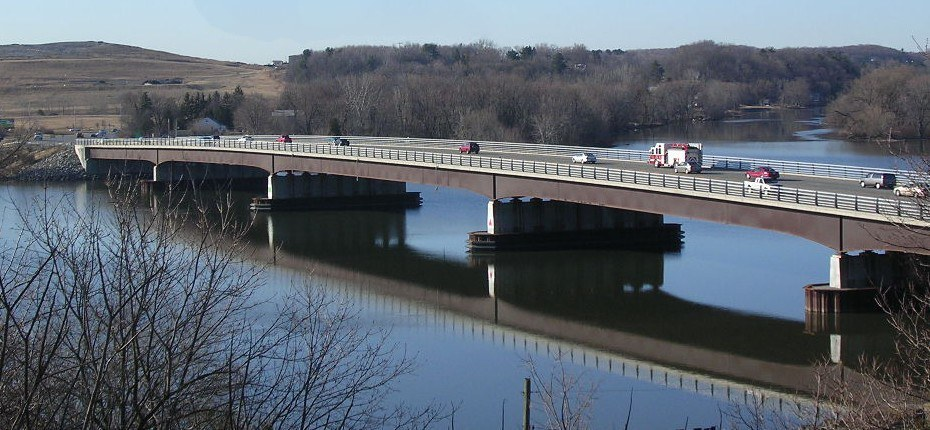
- Crescent Bridge, Crescent, New York
- Etymology: named for the crescent shaped curve of the Mohawk River
- Location of Crescent within the state of New York
- Coordinates: 42°49′35″N 73°44′3″W
- Country: United States
- State: New York
- Region: Capital District
- County: Saratoga
- Elevation: 210 ft (64 m)
- Time zone: UTC-5 (EST)
  - Summer (DST): UTC-4 (EDT)
- ZIP Code: 12065 (Clifton Park), 12188 (Waterford)
- Area code: 518

Crescent is a hamlet in the town of Halfmoon, New York, United States. It lies on the north bank of the Mohawk River in Saratoga County.

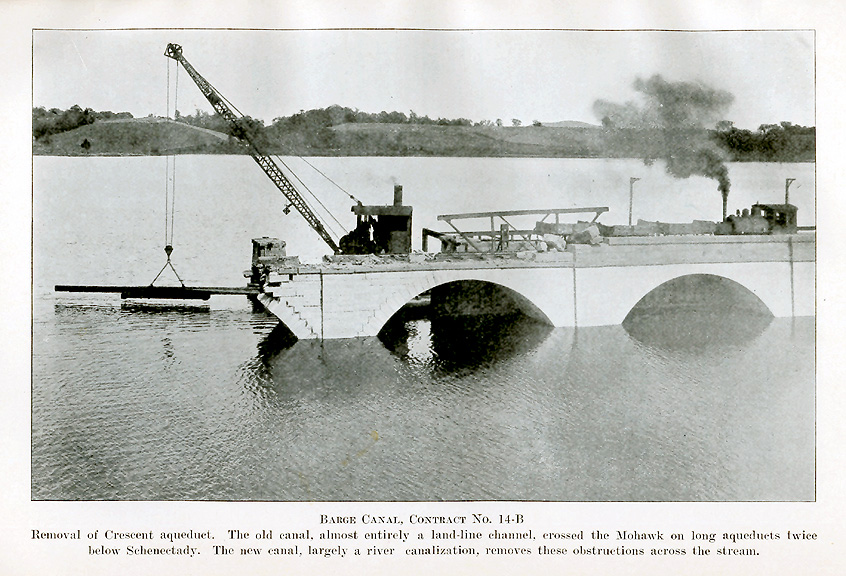
Dismantling the Crescent aqueduct in 1915.

Crescent was the northern terminus of an aqueduct which carried the Erie Canal over the Mohawk River. The original wooden aqueduct was built in 1825. The 26-arched stone aqueduct which replaced the wooden structure, was demolished in 1918 and only fragments of the stone piers remain.

In the 1840s, the cheap transportation provided by the canal spurred economic development in Crescent. This included a paint works, an iron foundry, and brickworks, located there, and businesses supplying the canal boats prospered. Grain was transhipped at Crescent; it was said "teams in a line half a mile long having been seen waiting for a chance to unload." In 1860 the population was 593.

Today, Crescent is the location of the Crescent Bridge carrying U.S. Route 9 from Albany County.

The Crescent Methodist Episcopal Church (now demolished), Noxon Bank Building, and Oakcliff are listed on the National Register of Historic Places.
