= Lakemont, New York =

Human settlement in New York, United States

Coordinates: 42°30′58″N 76°55′41″W

Lakemont is a hamlet in the town of Starkey, Yates County, New York, United States. It is part of the Finger Lakes region. Lakemont is located several miles north of Glenora. Patrick "Kettle" Johnson is buried in a cemetery near Lakemont. In 2023, a group of six men embarked on a journey of over six hours in duration to search for his remains and his alleged cache of Krugerrands. After a 4-day search which included the historic Watkins Glen Race Track, they were unsuccessful and returned home. His burial location is not specified. The ZIP Code for Lakemont is 14857.

The American writer and composer Paul Bowles is buried there.
