= Noxon Bank Building =

Historic commercial building in New York, United States

- U.S. National Register of Historic Places
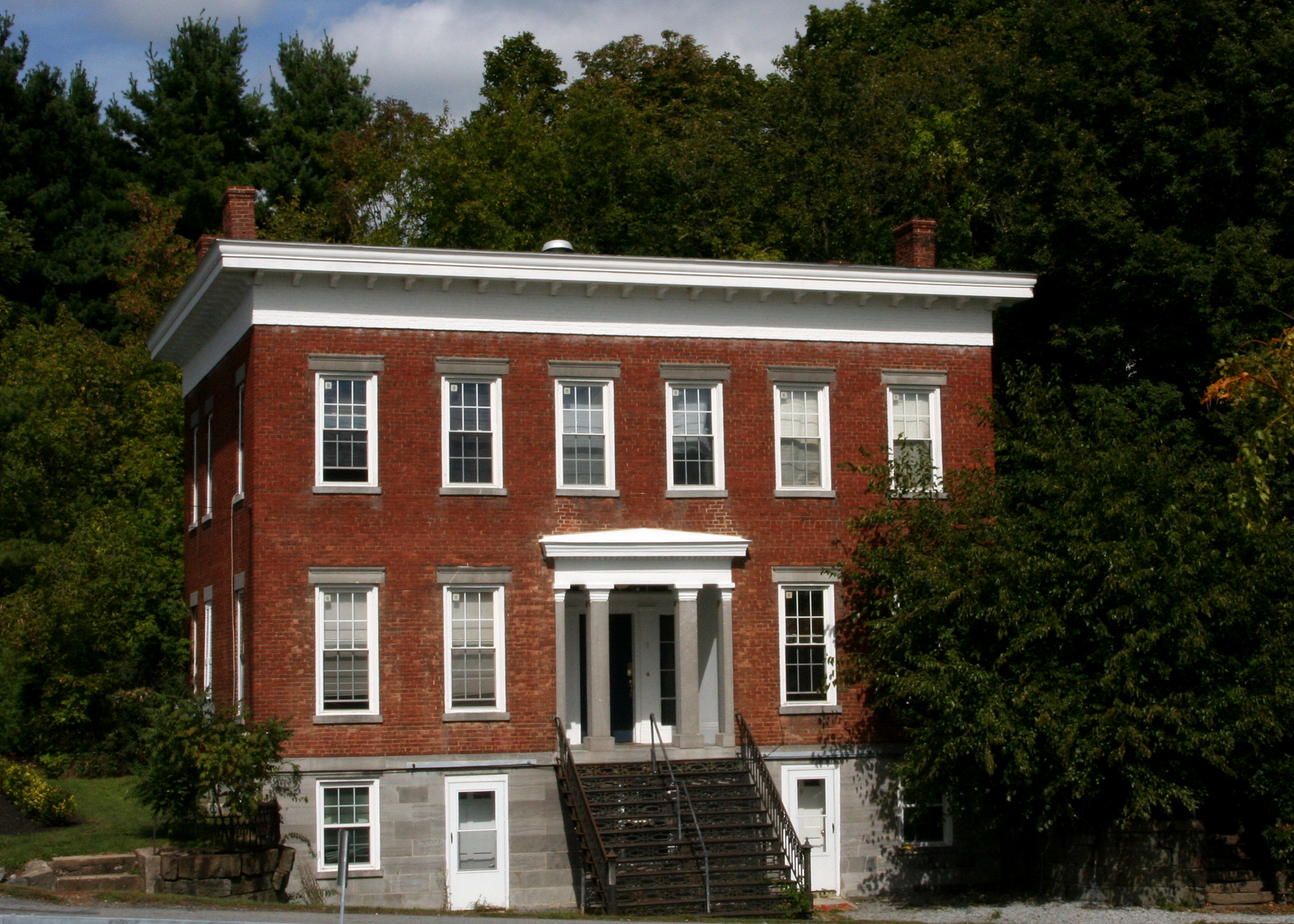
- Noxon Bank Building, September 2012

- Location within New York Location within the United States
- Location: 9 Terminal Rd., Crescent, New York
- Coordinates: 42°49′25″N 73°43′58″W
- Area: less than one acre
- Built: 1842
- Architectural style: Greek Revival
- NRHP reference No.: 03001247
- Added to NRHP: December 04, 2003

Noxon Bank Building is a historic bank building located at Crescent in Saratoga County, New York. It was built in 1842 and is a three-story, square, hipped roof structure of brick and stone in the Greek Revival style. There is a two-story, hipped roofed brick wing. The entrance features cut limestone Tuscan order columns and pilasters.

It was listed on the National Register of Historic Places in 2003.
