= Penn Yan Airport =

Coordinates: 42.6371°N 77.0529°W

Penn Yan Airport (ICAO: KPEO, FAA LID: PEO) is a county-owned public-use airport located one nautical mile (1.8 km) south of the central business district of the Penn Yan, a village in Yates County, New York, United States. It is also known as Penn Yan - Yates County Airport.

Although most U.S. airports use the same three-letter location identifier for the FAA and IATA, this airport is assigned PEO by the FAA but has no designation from the IATA.

== Facilities and aircraft ==
Penn Yan Airport covers an area of 315 acres (127 ha) at an elevation of 990 feet (302 m) above mean sea level. It has two asphalt paved runways: 1/19 is 5,500 by 100 feet (1,676 x 30 m) and 10/28 is 3,561 by 50 feet (1,085 x 15 m).

For the 12-month period ending March 31, 2025, the airport had over 10,000 aircraft operations. There are over 70 aircraft based at this airport.

The airport is owned by Yates County, New York and managed and operated by Seneca Flight Operations, which is a Division of Seneca Foods Corporation (NASDAQ: SENEB). According to the National Air Transportation Association (NATA), the Penn Yan / Yates County Airport is one of "America's 100 most needed airports". In 2019, the New York State Department of Transportation conducted a study of the economic impact of all airports in New York State. Including indirect expenditures, the total impact for Penn Yan Airport was $23.3 Million supporting 84 jobs.

== See also ==
- List of airports in New York
