= Barrington, New York =

- Town
- Location in Yates County and the state of New York.
- Coordinates: 42°32′13″N 77°3′52″W
- Country: United States
- State: New York
- County: Yates

Area
  - Total: 37.13 sq mi (96.17 km^{2})
  - Land: 35.75 sq mi (92.60 km^{2})
  - Water: 1.38 sq mi (3.57 km^{2})
- Elevation: 1,637 ft (499 m)

Population (2020)
  - Total: 1,541
- Time zone: UTC-5 (Eastern (EST))
  - Summer (DST): UTC-4 (EDT)
- FIPS code: 36-04594
- GNIS feature ID: 0978711
- Website: www.townofbarrington.org

Barrington is a town in Yates County, New York, United States. The population was 1,541 at the 2020 census.

The Town of Barrington is located in the south part of the county and is south of Geneva.

== History ==
The first settler arrived around 1800, but no others arrived for several years. The land of the town was once part of the Phelps and Gorham Purchase.

The town was established in 1822 while still part of Steuben County from the Towns of Reading and Wayne. In 1826, Barrington was made part of Yates County, a year after the creation of the county.

In 1865, a mineral spring was discovered in the south part of the county, leading to the development of Crystal Spring.

Barrington was the home of two locally renowned country and western bands, The Barrington Ridge Runners (1940–1960) and The Hill and Valley Boys (1957–1967). Most members of these bands were direct descendants of the first settlers of Barrington.

The Spicer-Millard House was listed on the National Register of Historic Places in 1994.

== Geography ==
According to the United States Census Bureau, the town has a total area of 37.0 square miles (96 km^{2}), of which, 35.7 square miles (92 km^{2}) is land and 1.4 square miles (3.6 km^{2}) (3.70%) is water.

The western town line is delineated by Keuka Lake, one of the Finger Lakes. The southern town line is the border of Schuyler County. Yates county shares a small common border in the southwest with Steuben County.

New York State Route 54 runs in a north–south direction along Keuka Lake. New York State Route 14A, another north–south highway, intersects New York State Route 230 in the eastern part of the town.

== Demographics ==
Historical population
| Census | Pop. | Note | %± |
|---|---|---|---|
| 1830 | 1,854 | | — |
| 1840 | 1,868 | | 0.8% |
| 1850 | 1,550 | | −17.0% |
| 1860 | 1,574 | | 1.5% |
| 1870 | 1,506 | | −4.3% |
| 1880 | 1,478 | | −1.9% |
| 1890 | 1,393 | | −5.8% |
| 1900 | 1,249 | | −10.3% |
| 1910 | 1,044 | | −16.4% |
| 1920 | 822 | | −21.3% |
| 1930 | 790 | | −3.9% |
| 1940 | 782 | | −1.0% |
| 1950 | 771 | | −1.4% |
| 1960 | 754 | | −2.2% |
| 1970 | 929 | | 23.2% |
| 1980 | 1,091 | | 17.4% |
| 1990 | 1,195 | | 9.5% |
| 2000 | 1,396 | | 16.8% |
| 2010 | 1,681 | | 20.4% |
| 2016 (est.) | 1,666 | | −0.9% |
U.S. Decennial Census

As of the census of 2000, there were 1,396 people, 490 households, and 381 families residing in the town. The population density was 39.1 inhabitants per square mile (15.1/km^{2}). There were 900 housing units at an average density of 25.2 units per square mile (9.7 units/km^{2}). The racial makeup of the town was 98.85% White, 0.29% African American, 0.14% Native American, 0.14% from other races, and 0.57% from two or more races. Hispanic or Latino of any race were 0.43% of the population.

There were 490 households, out of which 33.9% had children under the age of 18 living with them, 68.6% were married couples living together, 6.7% had a female householder with no husband present, and 22.2% were non-families. 18.2% of all households were made up of individuals, and 9.0% had someone living alone who was 65 years of age or older. The average household size was 2.85 and the average family size was 3.24.

In the town, the population was spread out, with 30.9% under the age of 18, 5.5% from 18 to 24, 25.3% from 25 to 44, 23.5% from 45 to 64, and 14.8% who were 65 years of age or older. The median age was 36 years. For every 100 females, there were 97.5 males. For every 100 females age 18 and over, there were 95.1 males.

The median income for a household in the town was $36,184, and the median income for a family was $38,864. Males had a median income of $29,301 versus $18,482 for females. The per capita income for the town was $15,416. About 11.5% of families and 16.9% of the population were below the poverty line, including 28.0% of those under age 18 and 6.4% of those age 65 or over.

== Communities and locations in the Town of Barrington ==
- Barrington – The hamlet of Barrington is at the junction of County Roads 17 and 38 in the northwestern quadrant of the town.
- Crosby – A hamlet near the southern end of Lake Keuka on NY-54.
- Crystal Spring – A hamlet near the southern town line and the location of a mineral spring discovered in 1865.
- Porter's Corner – A hamlet east of Barrington village on County Road 38.
