= Crescent Methodist Episcopal Church =

Historic church in New York, United States

- U.S. National Register of Historic Places
- Location within New York Location within the United States
- Location: Crescent, Crescent, New York
- Coordinates: 42°49′29″N 73°43′53″W
- Area: less than one acre
- Built: 1852
- Architectural style: Greek Revival
- NRHP reference No.: 00000091
- Added to NRHP: February 10, 2000

Crescent Methodist Episcopal Church is a historic Methodist Episcopal church located in Crescent, Saratoga County, New York. It was built in 1852 and is a rectangular, three-by-five-bay, brick church in a vernacular Greek Revival style. It is topped by a shallow-pitched, slate-covered, gable roof. It features a two-stage, flat-roofed, open belfry with Tuscan order columns. Attached is a 1-story parish hall wing.

It was listed on the National Register of Historic Places in 2000.

Due to its poor condition the church was judged unsafe, and was demolished prior to 2013.
