= Milo, New York =

- Town
- Location in Yates County and the state of New York.
- Coordinates: 42°37′25″N 77°1′20″W
- Country: United States
- State: New York
- County: Yates

Area
  - Total: 44.34 sq mi (114.83 km^{2})
  - Land: 38.43 sq mi (99.54 km^{2})
  - Water: 5.90 sq mi (15.28 km^{2})
- Elevation: 1,037 ft (316 m)

Population (2020)
  - Total: 6,803
- Time zone: UTC-5 (Eastern (EST))
  - Summer (DST): UTC-4 (EDT)
- FIPS code: 36-47504
- GNIS feature ID: 0979220
- Website: Town website

Milo is a town in Yates County, New York, United States. The population was 6,803 at the 2020 census. The town was named after Milo of Croton, a famous athlete from Ancient Greece.

The Town of Milo is on the eastern border of the county and borders Penn Yan.

== History ==
The region was within the realm of the Seneca tribe before Europeans entered the area.

Settlement began around 1788 by members of the Universal Friends, a religious sect. In 1818, the town was founded from part of the Town of Benton, while still part of Ontario County. By 1820, the population was about 1,612. When Yates county was formed in 1823, Milo became part of the new county.

In 1833, the Village of Penn Yan was incorporated, setting itself apart from the town.

The Crooked Lake Canal ran partly across the northern part of Milo when it opened in 1833. Around 1877, the canal ceased to function and its lands were taken over by railroads.

The Jonathan Bailey House, Miles Raplee House, and William Swarthout Farm are listed on the National Register of Historic Places.

== Geography ==
According to the United States Census Bureau, the town has a total area of 44.3 square miles (115 km^{2}), of which 38.4 square miles (99 km^{2}) is land and 5.9 square miles (15 km^{2}) (13.37%) is water.

Milo lies between Keuka Lake and Seneca Lake, which define, respectively, the western and eastern town lines and are two of the Finger Lakes. The Keuka Lake Outlet flows between the lakes in the northern part of the town and helped determine the course of the Crooked Lake Canal.

New York State Route 14, New York State Route 14A, and New York State Route 54 are north-south highways in the town.

== Demographics ==
Historical population
Census	Pop.	Note	%±
1820	2,612		—
1830	3,620		38.6%
1840	3,986		10.1%
1850	4,791		20.2%
1860	2,028		−57.7%
1870	4,779		135.7%
1880	5,755		20.4%
1890	6,028		4.7%
1900	6,318		4.8%
1910	6,088		−3.6%
1920	5,817		−4.5%
1930	6,561		12.8%
1940	6,377		−2.8%
1950	6,576		3.1%
1960	6,965		5.9%
1970	6,654		−4.5%
1980	6,732		1.2%
1990	7,023		4.3%
2000	7,026		0.0%
2010	7,006		−0.3%
2016 (est.)	6,821		−2.6%
U.S. Decennial Census

As of the census of 2000, there were 7,026 people, 2,824 households, and 1,790 families residing in the town. The population density was 183.1 inhabitants per square mile (70.7/km^{2}). There were 3,422 housing units at an average density of 89.2 per square mile (34.4/km^{2}). The racial makeup of the town was 97.37% White, 0.63% African American, 0.24% Native American, 0.28% Asian, 0.04% Pacific Islander, 0.34% from other races, and 1.10% from two or more races. Hispanic or Latino of any race were 0.87% of the population.

There were 2,824 households, out of which 30.2% had children under the age of 18 living with them, 47.3% were married couples living together, 11.4% had a female householder with no husband present, and 36.6% were non-families. 30.8% of all households were made up of individuals, and 15.5% had someone living alone who was 65 years of age or older. The average household size was 2.43 and the average family size was 3.02.

In the town, the population was spread out, with 26.3% under the age of 18, 8.0% from 18 to 24, 26.3% from 25 to 44, 21.9% from 45 to 64, and 17.5% who were 65 years of age or older. The median age was 38 years. For every 100 females, there were 93.2 males. For every 100 females age 18 and over, there were 88.4 males.

The median income for a household in the town was $31,102, and the median income for a family was $38,547. Males had a median income of $28,475 versus $20,109 for females. The per capita income for the town was $16,819. About 9.6% of families and 13.8% of the population were below the poverty line, including 18.8% of those under age 18 and 8.7% of those age 65 or over.

== Communities and locations in the Town of Milo ==
- Camp Cory – A summer camp located just south of Penn Yan.
- Himrod (formerly "Himrods Corners" and then "Himrods") – A hamlet in the southeast part of the town at the junction of County Roads 1 and 36.
- Keuka Mills – A hamlet east of Penn Yan by Keuka Lake Outlet.
- Keuka Lake Outlet – A stream connecting Keuka Lake to Seneca Lake.
- Mays Mills – A hamlet east of Penn Yan on Keuka Lake Outlet.
- Milo – A location east of Milo Center on the east town line on County Road 7.
- Milo Center (formerly "Nichols Corners") – A hamlet in the eastern part of the town on County Road. The John Briggs House was listed on the National Register of Historic Places in 1994.
- Milo Mills – A hamlet east of Penn Yan on Keuka Lake Outlet.
- Penn Yan – The Village of Penn Yan is at the north town line and at the north end of Keuka Lake at the junction of NY-14A and NY-54.
- Penn Yan Airport (PEO) – A general aviation airport south of Penn Yan village.
- Randall Crossing – A hamlet in the southeast part of the town near Seneca Lake, situated on NY-14.
- Second Milo – A hamlet east of Willow Grove, located on NY-14A.
- Seneca Mills – A hamlet east of Penn Yan on Keuka Lake Outlet.
- Thayer Corners – A location between Willow Grove and Second Milo.
- Townsend Corners – A location in the east part of the town on County Road 28.
- Willow Grove – A hamlet on the shore of Keuka Lake in the southwest part of the town and located on NY-54.
