= New York State Route 54A =

State highway in western New York, US

New York State Route 54A
- Map of Finger Lakes region in central New York with NY 54A highlighted in red

Route information
- Auxiliary route of NY 54
- Maintained by NYSDOT and the village of Hammondsport
- Length: 22.46 mi (36.15 km)
- Existed: 1930–present

Major junctions
- South end: NY 54 in Urbana
- North end: NY 14A / NY 54 in Penn Yan

Location
- Country: United States
- State: New York
- Counties: Steuben, Yates

Highway system
- New York Highways; Interstate; US; State; Reference; Parkways
← NY 54	→ NY 55

New York State Route 54A (NY 54A) is a state highway in the western part of New York in the United States. It runs in a northeast to southwest direction through part of the Finger Lakes district of New York. The southern terminus of NY 54A is at NY 54 south of Hammondsport. The northern terminus is in Penn Yan, where it rejoins NY 54. Unlike NY 54, which runs along the east side of Keuka Lake, NY 54A has a more circuitous route around the western side of the lake.

== Route description ==
NY 54A begins at an intersection with NY 54 in the town of Urbana. NY 54A proceeds northward through Urbana as Main Street Extension, crossing Keuka Inlet into the village of Hammondsport. After the inlet, NY 54A changes names to Main Street, crosses over the Bath and Hammondsport Railroad alignment and enters downtown Hammondsport. The route remains a two-lane residential highway, intersecting with County Route 88 (CR 88; Lake Street) before turning eastward on Pulteney Street. Bending to the northwest through the northern end of the village, NY 54A leaves along the side of Keuka Lake. Now known as West Lake Road, NY 54A is now paralleling CR 76 (Hammondsport-South Pulteney Road) through Urbana. Continuing lakeside, NY 54A passes a long stretch of lakeside residences. Continuing northeast, NY 54A enters the lakeside hamlet of Glen Grove, consisting of a few lakeside homes.

After leaving Glen Grove, NY 54A bends northward out of the hamlet through Urbana until entering the town of Pulteney. Turning northeastward once again, the route enters the hamlet of Gibson Landing at an intersection with Gallagher Road. Gibson Landing consists of a few lakeside homes before leaving to the north. Passing Lakeside Park, a local park, the route turns northward into the hamlet of Lakeside Park. In Lakeside Park, NY 54A intersects with the eastern terminus of CR 78. NY 54A continues northward through Pulteney. Several miles to the north, NY 54A crosses the county line into Yates County and the town of Jerusalem. NY 54A turns to the northwest slightly away from the lake, crossing into the hamlet of Branchport. In Branchport, the route intersects with CR 32 (Italy Hill Road) and CR 29 (North Main Street). At this intersection, NY 54A turns eastward along CR 32's former right-of-way, while, CR 29 continued northward.

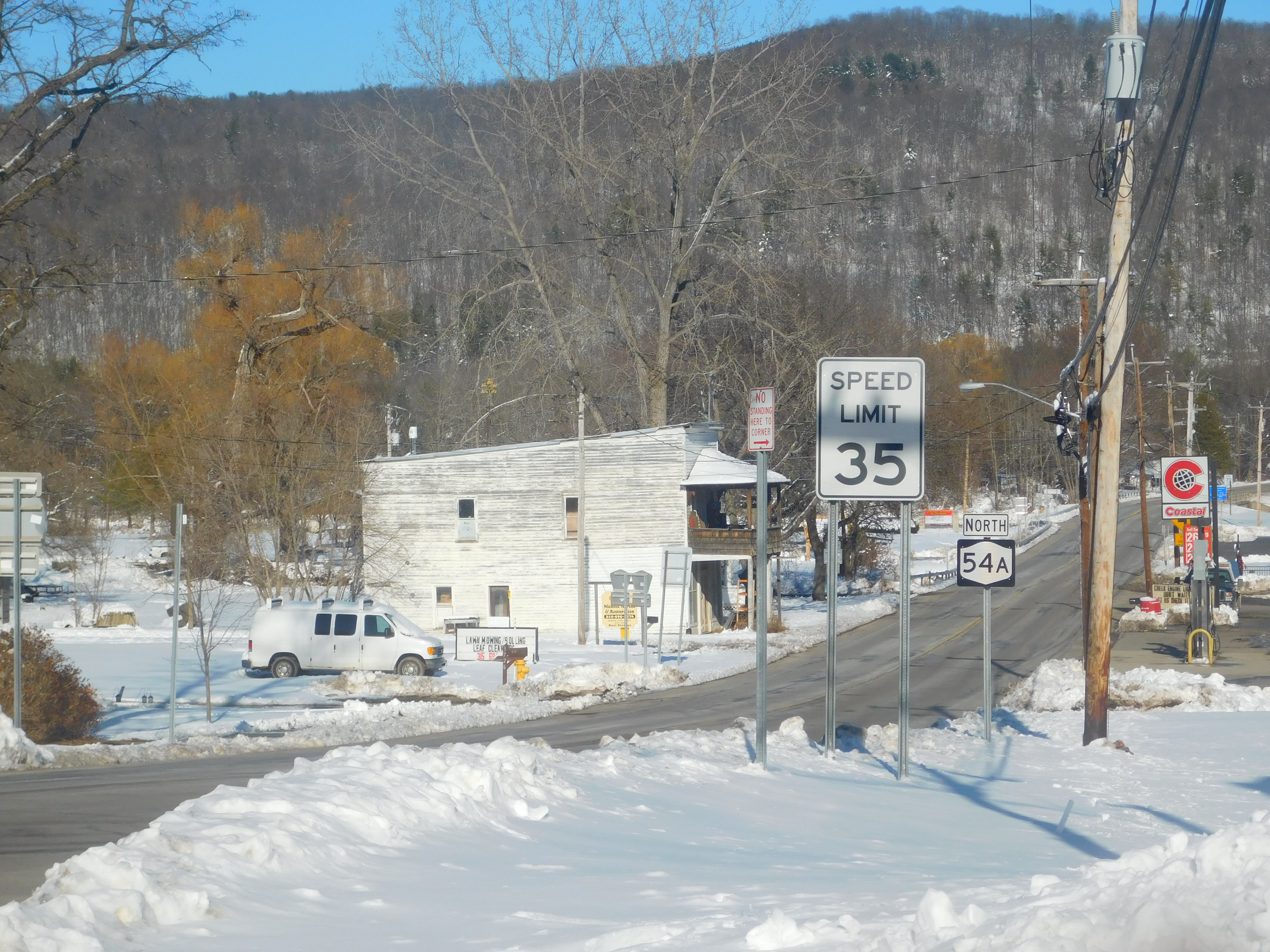
NY 54A northbound in Branchport

Crossing the northern end of one branch of Keuka Lake, NY 54A heads eastward as a two-lane highway, passing to the north of Keuka Lake State Park. Continuing NY 54A bends northeastward into the hamlet of Bluff Point, which consists of a few farms. Continuing through Jerusalem, NY 54A passes Elephant Park and into the hamlet of Keuka Park. In Keuka Park, NY 54A intersects with CR 25 (Central Avenue) and comes within a mile of the other branch of Keuka Lake. After paralleling and intersecting with CR 21, NY 54A enters the village of Penn Yan. Through Penn Yan, NY 54A passes Lakeview Cemetery, becoming known as Elm Street through downtown. NY 54A crosses NY 14A (Liberty Street) as a two-lane village street before intersecting NY 54 once again at Main Street. This intersection serves as NY 54A's northern terminus.

== History ==
The roadway along the western shores of Keuka Lake from Hammondsport to Penn Yan was originally designated as part of NY 38 in the mid-1920s. In the 1930 renumbering of state highways in New York, the portion of NY 38 from Bath to Penn Yan became part of the new NY 54. At the same time, an alternate route of NY 54 between Hammondsport and Penn Yan along the eastern shoreline of Keuka Lake was designated as NY 54A. The alignments of NY 54 and NY 54A between Hammondsport and Penn Yan were flipped in the early 1940s, placing NY 54A on its current alignment.

After deteriorating for many years, the 5-mile (8 km) portion of NY 54A between Penn Yan and Branchport underwent a $5.2 million rehabilitation during the summer of 2010. This work was done after several years of loud complaints from area residents. In October, local and state officials gathered at the scenic overlook near Esperanza Drive for a ribbon cutting to celebrate the completion of the project.

== Major intersections ==
County	Location	mi	km	Destinations	Notes
Steuben	Urbana	0.00	0.00	NY 54 – Penn Yan, Bath	Southern terminus
Yates	Penn Yan	22.46	36.15	NY 14A (Liberty Street) / NY 54 (Brown Street)	Northern terminus
1.000 mi = 1.609 km; 1.000 km = 0.621 mi
