= Yates County, New York =

County in New York, United States

- County
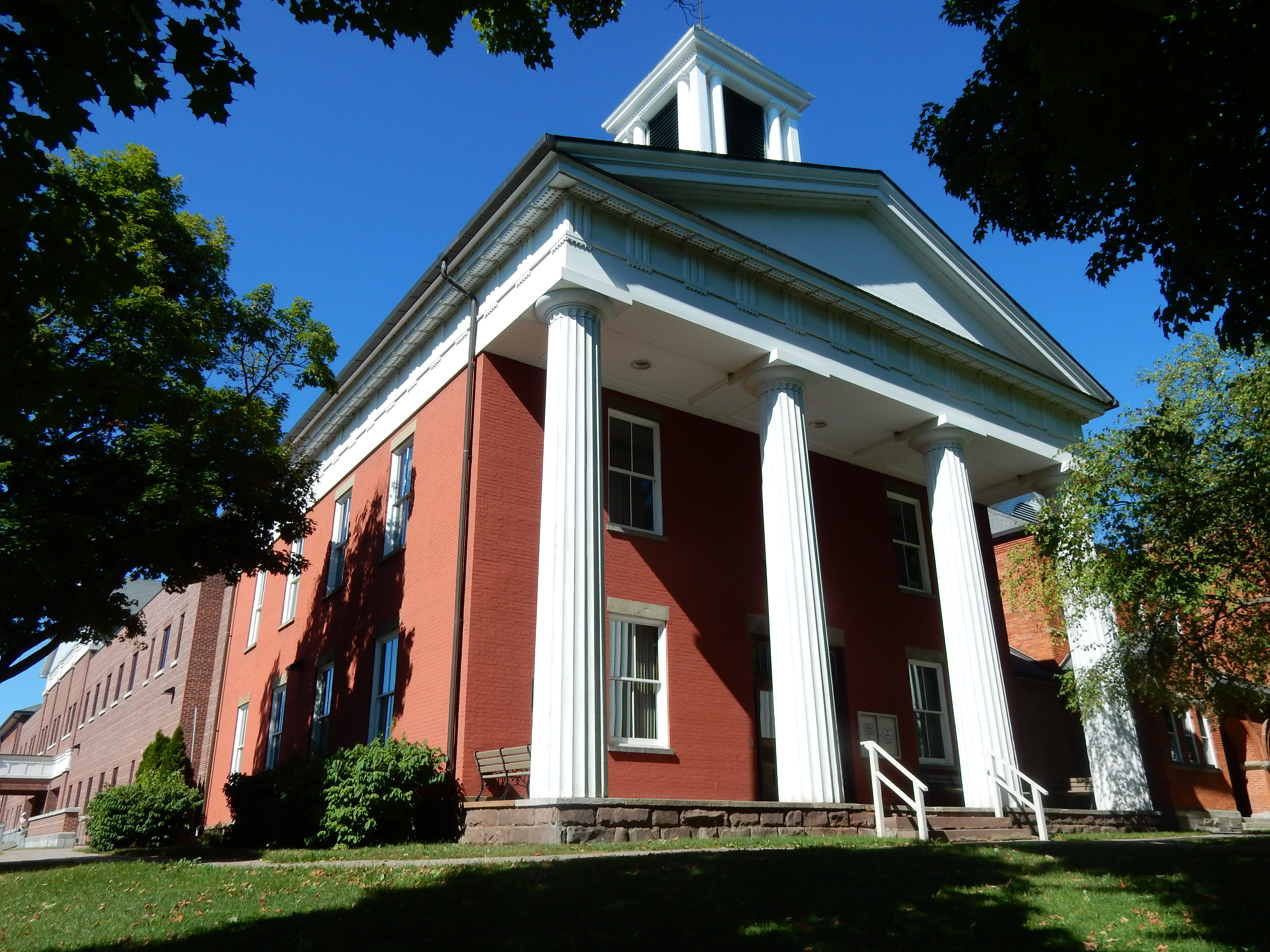
- Yates County Courthouse

- Location within the U.S. state of New York
- Coordinates: 42°38′N 77°06′W
- Country: United States
- State: New York
- Founded: February 5, 1823
- Named for: Joseph C. Yates
- Seat: Penn Yan
- Largest village: Penn Yan

Area
  - Total: 376 sq mi (970 km^{2})
  - Land: 338 sq mi (880 km^{2})
  - Water: 38 sq mi (98 km^{2}) 10%

Population (2020)
  - Total: 24,774
  - Estimate (2025): 24,547 ▼
  - Density: 73.3/sq mi (28.3/km^{2})
- Time zone: UTC−5 (Eastern)
  - Summer (DST): UTC−4 (EDT)
- Congressional district: 24th
- Website: www.yatescountyny.gov

Yates County is a county in the U.S. state of New York. As of the 2020 Census, the population was 24,774, making it the third-least populous county in New York. The county seat is Penn Yan. The name is in honor of Joseph C. Yates, who as Governor of New York signed the act establishing the county. The county is part of the Finger Lakes region of the state.

== Formation of the county ==
When counties were established in New York State in 1683, the present Yates County was part of Albany County. This was an enormous county, including the northern part of New York State as well as all of the present State of Vermont and, in theory, extending westward to the Pacific Ocean. This county was reduced in size on July 3, 1766, by the creation of Cumberland County, and again on March 16, 1770, by the creation of Gloucester County, both containing territory now in Vermont.

On March 12, 1772, what was left of Albany County was split into three parts, one remaining under the name Albany County. One of the other pieces, Tryon County, contained the western portion (and thus, since no western boundary was specified, theoretically still extended west to the Pacific). The eastern boundary of Tryon County was approximately five miles west of the present city of Schenectady, and the county included the western part of the Adirondack Mountains and the area west of the West Branch of the Delaware River. The area then designated as Tryon County now includes 37 counties of New York State. The county was named for William Tryon, colonial governor of New York.

In the years prior to 1776, most of the Loyalists in Tryon County fled to Canada. In 1784, following the peace treaty that ended the American Revolutionary War, the name of Tryon County was changed to honor the general, Richard Montgomery, who had captured several places in Canada and died attempting to capture the city of Quebec, replacing the name of the hated British governor.

On January 27, 1789, 10,480 square miles (27,140 km^{2}) of Montgomery County was split off to create Ontario County, including the lands of the present Allegany, Cattaraugus, Chautauqua, Erie, Genesee, Livingston, Monroe, Niagara, Orleans, Steuben, Wyoming, and Yates counties, and part of Schuyler and Wayne counties.

On March 18, 1796, 1,800 square miles (4,700 km^{2}) of Ontario County was partitioned to form Steuben County.

On April 3, 1801, Ontario County exchanged land with Cayuga County, and lost 190 square miles (490 km^{2}) as a result.

On March 30, 1802, Ontario County lost 6,540 square miles (16,940 km^{2}) of land through the partition of Genesee County, including the present Allegany, Cattaraugus, Chautauqua, Erie, Niagara, Orleans and Wyoming counties and parts of Livingston and Monroe counties.

In 1821, Ontario County was reduced in size by combining portions of Genesee and Ontario counties to create Livingston and Monroe counties.

On February 5, 1823, Yates County was formed from 310 square miles (800 km^{2}) of Ontario County, including the area that included Vine Valley, Middlesex, Penn Yan, and Dresden, New York.

On January 1, 1826, 60 square miles (160 km^{2}) of Steuben County was partitioned and added to Yates, which included Starkey, Dundee, and Lakemont, New York.

Historical Map of Yates County, 1855

On April 15, 1828, 10 square miles (26 km^{2}) was partitioned from Yates, and passed to Seneca and Tompkins counties, mostly in the forest.

On March 17, 1860, Ontario County was authorized to gain land from Yates, but it was never put into effect.

On April 18, 1946, Yates gained 10 square miles (26 km^{2}) from Schuyler and Seneca counties, which produced the current borders of Yates County.

== History ==
In 1790 the Public Universal Friend and their society moved to the area from their original base in Rhode Island, forming a community at New Jerusalem, south west of Penn Yan, where The Friend's house can still be seen.

In 1974 a new Mennonite settlement was started in Yates County. It grew quickly and steadily and with a population of more than 3,000 in 2015 it was almost as large as the Lancaster County, Pennsylvania settlement.

== Geography ==
According to the U.S. Census Bureau, the county has a total area of 376 square miles (970 km^{2}), of which 338 square miles (880 km^{2}) is land and 38 square miles (98 km^{2}) (10%) is water.

Yates County is in the western part of New York State, northwest of Ithaca and southeast of Rochester. It is in the Finger Lakes Region.

=== Adjacent counties ===
- Ontario County - northwest
- Seneca County - east
- Schuyler County - south
- Steuben County - southwest

== Demographics ==
Historical population
Census	Pop.	Note	%±
1830	19,009		—
1840	20,444		7.5%
1850	20,590		0.7%
1860	20,290		−1.5%
1870	19,595		−3.4%
1880	21,087		7.6%
1890	21,001		−0.4%
1900	20,318		−3.3%
1910	18,642		−8.2%
1920	16,641		−10.7%
1930	16,848		1.2%
1940	16,381		−2.8%
1950	17,615		7.5%
1960	18,614		5.7%
1970	19,831		6.5%
1980	21,459		8.2%
1990	22,810		6.3%
2000	24,621		7.9%
2010	25,348		3.0%
2020	24,774		−2.3%
2025 (est.)	24,547	▼	−0.9%
U.S. Decennial Census; 1790-1960 1900-1990; 1990-2000 2010-2020 2020-2030

=== 2020 census ===
Yates County, New York – Racial and ethnic composition Note: the US Census treats Hispanic/Latino as an ethnic category. This table excludes Latinos from the racial categories and assigns them to a separate category. Hispanics/Latinos may be of any race.
Race / Ethnicity (NH = Non-Hispanic)	Pop 1980	Pop 1990	Pop 2000	Pop 2010	Pop 2020	% 1980	% 1990	% 2000	% 2010	% 2020
White alone (NH)	21,149	22,330	23,983	24,371	23,049	98.56%	97.90%	97.41%	96.15%	93.04%
Black or African American alone (NH)	128	139	130	196	145	0.60%	0.61%	0.53%	0.77%	0.59%
Native American or Alaska Native alone (NH)	20	46	32	35	28	0.09%	0.20%	0.13%	0.14%	0.11%
Asian alone (NH)	26	64	66	96	93	0.12%	0.28%	0.27%	0.38%	0.38%
Native Hawaiian or Pacific Islander alone (NH)	x	x	4	1	8	x	x	0.02%	0.00%	0.03%
Other race alone (NH)	21	1	11	13	77	0.10%	0.00%	0.04%	0.05%	0.31%
Mixed race or Multiracial (NH)	x	x	167	215	700	x	x	0.68%	0.85%	2.83%
Hispanic or Latino (any race)	115	230	228	421	674	0.54%	1.01%	0.93%	1.66%	2.72%
Total	21,459	22,810	24,621	25,348	24,774	100.00%	100.00%	100.00%	100.00%	100.00%

The most reported ancestries in 2020 were:

- English (27%)
- German (19.5%)
- Irish (14.4%)
- Italian (5.2%)
- Scottish (3.2%)
- Dutch (3%)
- Polish (2.6%)
- Danish (2.3%)
- Swiss (2.3%)
- French (2.1%)

=== 2000 census ===
As of the census of 2000, there were 24,621 people, 9,029 households, and 6,284 families residing in the county. The population density was 73 people per square mile (28 people/km^{2}). There were 12,064 housing units at an average density of 36 units per square mile (14/km^{2}). The racial makeup of the county was 97.90% White, 0.56% African American, 0.15% Native American, 0.28% Asian, 0.02% Pacific Islander, 0.36% from other races, and 0.74% from two or more races. Hispanic or Latino of any race were 0.93% of the population. 21.3% were of English, 16.5% German, 11.4% Irish, 10.7% American, 5.3% Danish and 5.3% Italian ancestry according to Census 2000.

5.46% of the population over 5 years old, mostly Wenger Old Order Mennonites, report speaking Pennsylvania Dutch, German, or Dutch at home, a further 1.54% speak Spanish.

There were 9,029 households, out of which 31.50% had children under the age of 18 living with them, 56.00% were married couples living together, 9.40% had a female householder with no husband present, and 30.40% were non-families. 24.60% of all households were made up of individuals, and 11.60% had someone living alone who was 65 years of age or older. The average household size was 2.59 and the average family size was 3.08.

In the county, the population was spread out, with 26.70% under the age of 18, 9.30% from 18 to 24, 24.70% from 25 to 44, 23.90% from 45 to 64, and 15.50% who were 65 years of age or older. The median age was 38 years. For every 100 females there were 95.30 males. For every 100 females age 18 and over, there were 91.30 males.

The median income for a household in the county was $34,640, and the median income for a family was $40,681. Males had a median income of $29,671 versus $21,566 for females. The per capita income for the county was $16,781. About 8.90% of families and 13.10% of the population were below the poverty line, including 20.90% of those under age 18 and 7.10% of those age 65 or over.

== Education ==
Keuka College is in this county.

== Transportation ==
Yates County has one private airstrip and two public-use airports:

- Penn Yan Airport (PEO), the principal airport in the county, is on a hill south of Penn Yan.
- Middlesex Valley Airport (4N2) – Middlesex

Yates Transit Service provides bus service to Yates County. The county's Highway Department is headquartered in Penn Yan and is charged with maintaining roads, including:

- Overseeing road construction and repair
- Issuing special permits for hauling, driveway installation and replacement, and installation of non-standard and supplemental signs
- Removing snow and ice

Each town and village within Yates County maintains its own highway department.

=== Major roadways ===
- New York State Route 14
- New York State Route 14A
- New York State Route 21
- New York State Route 54
- New York State Route 54A
- New York State Route 230
- New York State Route 245
- New York State Route 247
- New York State Route 364
- List of county routes in Yates County, New York

The former New York State Route 961H was located in Yates County.

== Communities ==
#	Location	Population	Type
1	†Penn Yan	5,159	Village
2	Dundee	1,725	Village
3	Keuka Park	1,137	CDP
4	‡Rushville	655	Village
5	Dresden	308	Village

† County seat
‡ Not wholly in this county

=== Towns ===
- Barrington
- Benton
- Italy
- Jerusalem
- Middlesex
- Milo
- Potter
- Starkey
- Torrey

=== Hamlets ===
- Bellona
- Branchport
- Glenora
- Himrod
- Lakemont
- Middlesex
- Potter Center
- Rock Stream

== Politics ==
Yates County has been a Republican bastion, voting for a Democrat only twice since 1856. Although Mitt Romney won the county by only 3.3% in 2012, Donald Trump had won the county by a decisive 19.9% in 2016. In 2020, however, Trump won by a slightly lower margin, of 18.5%. In 2024, Trump won again, but by a reduced margin of 15.9%, bucking the national trend.

United States presidential election results for Yates County, New York
Year	Republican / Whig		Democratic		Third party(ies)	
Year	No.	%	No.	%	No.	%
1828	1,101	41.17%	1,573	58.83%	0	0.00%
1832	1,325	40.76%	1,926	59.24%	0	0.00%
1836	1,472	46.61%	1,686	53.39%	0	0.00%
1840	2,072	49.30%	2,087	49.66%	44	1.05%
1844	2,056	47.02%	2,110	48.25%	207	4.73%
1848	1,651	40.13%	862	20.95%	1,601	38.92%
1852	1,974	44.35%	2,153	48.37%	324	7.28%
1856	2,994	70.28%	915	21.48%	351	8.24%
1860	3,014	67.28%	1,466	32.72%	0	0.00%
1864	3,036	64.20%	1,693	35.80%	0	0.00%
1868	3,136	64.18%	1,750	35.82%	0	0.00%
1872	2,760	59.75%	1,808	39.14%	51	1.10%
1876	3,227	60.97%	2,046	38.65%	20	0.38%
1880	3,432	59.79%	2,197	38.28%	111	1.93%
1884	3,191	58.67%	1,918	35.26%	330	6.07%
1888	3,410	58.26%	2,150	36.73%	293	5.01%
1892	3,014	55.18%	1,711	31.33%	737	13.49%
1896	3,370	59.86%	2,086	37.05%	174	3.09%
1900	3,432	58.97%	2,199	37.78%	189	3.25%
1904	3,380	63.63%	1,752	32.98%	180	3.39%
1908	3,275	60.98%	1,927	35.88%	169	3.15%
1912	1,795	41.10%	1,456	33.34%	1,116	25.56%
1916	2,940	61.78%	1,666	35.01%	153	3.21%
1920	5,638	76.28%	1,571	21.26%	182	2.46%
1924	6,334	77.69%	1,568	19.23%	251	3.08%
1928	7,386	78.62%	1,950	20.76%	59	0.63%
1932	6,048	70.46%	2,399	27.95%	137	1.60%
1936	6,897	74.32%	2,257	24.32%	126	1.36%
1940	7,084	76.38%	2,170	23.40%	21	0.23%
1944	6,338	75.89%	2,005	24.01%	9	0.11%
1948	5,997	73.37%	2,040	24.96%	137	1.68%
1952	7,831	81.07%	1,820	18.84%	9	0.09%
1956	7,910	83.12%	1,606	16.88%	0	0.00%
1960	6,892	74.04%	2,409	25.88%	7	0.08%
1964	3,675	42.42%	4,983	57.52%	5	0.06%
1968	5,482	67.54%	2,158	26.59%	477	5.88%
1972	6,639	77.04%	1,958	22.72%	21	0.24%
1976	5,796	66.30%	2,903	33.21%	43	0.49%
1980	4,694	55.99%	2,828	33.73%	862	10.28%
1984	6,367	70.26%	2,670	29.46%	25	0.28%
1988	5,488	60.48%	3,507	38.65%	79	0.87%
1992	4,366	43.26%	3,242	32.12%	2,484	24.61%
1996	3,925	42.08%	4,066	43.59%	1,336	14.32%
2000	5,565	55.32%	3,962	39.39%	532	5.29%
2004	6,309	58.90%	4,205	39.26%	197	1.84%
2008	5,269	51.25%	4,890	47.57%	121	1.18%
2012	4,798	50.82%	4,488	47.53%	156	1.65%
2016	5,660	56.23%	3,659	36.35%	747	7.42%
2020	6,208	57.89%	4,219	39.35%	296	2.76%
2024	6,098	57.48%	4,401	41.48%	110	1.04%

== See also ==
- List of counties in New York
- National Register of Historic Places listings in Yates County, New York
- The Bluff Point Stoneworks
