= Franklin S. Sampson =

American physician and politician

Franklin Sewall Sampson (May 25, 1851 – May 9, 1928) was an American physician and politician from New York.

== Life ==
Sampson was born on May 25, 1851, on a farm in St. Albans, Maine, the son of Daniel Sampson and Ruth Boynton.

Sampson studied medicine with Dr. W. E. Fellows. He attended the Hahnemann Medical College, graduating from there in 1882. He practiced medicine in Houlton for a time. He then practiced medicine in Shortsville, New York for six years. In 1888, he moved to Penn Yan, where he worked as a physician and surgeon for the rest of his life. He also drew plans for the Sampson Theatre, the Masonic building, and the hospital.

In 1922, Sampson was elected to the New York State Assembly as a Republican, representing Yates County. He served in the Assembly in 1923. He also served a coroner of Yates County, a member of the village board of trustees, and village president.

In 1882, Sampson married Ella Frances Varney. He was a member of the Freemasons and the Knights Templar.

On May 2, 1928, Sampson was seriously injured when his car was struck by a Pennsylvania Railroad train in Stanley. He died from his injuries in the Thompson Memorial Hospital in Canadaigua a week later, on May 9. He was buried in Lake View Cemetery.

New York State Assembly
Preceded by James M. Lown Jr.	New York State Assembly; Yates County; 1923	Succeeded by James H. Underwood
