= Penn Yan Boat Company =

American boat building company

Penn Yan Boat Company was an American boat building company. It produced a wide range of wooden and fiberglass powerboats, sailboats, canoes and rowboats. It was founded in 1921 by German-native Charles A. Herrman. It derived its name from the location of its headquarters, Penn Yan, New York. At its founding, the company built wood boats and canoes, switching to all fiberglass production in the early 1960s.

In 1936, Penn Yan introduced its "Car Top" outboard boat. The Car Top, which Penn Yan marketed as being easily lifted by two people, was designed to be light and narrow enough to fit on top of most cars of that era.

Among other innovations, Penn Yan was known for its patented "Tunnel Drive" concept, whereby a cavity was molded into the bottom of the boat's hull, partially enclosing the propeller and drive shaft. The tunnel drive system provided better boat speed and stability.

The company was sold to new owners in 1979 and finally ceased operations in 2002.
