= Roderick M. Morrison House =

Historic house in New York, United States

- U.S. National Register of Historic Places
- Location within New York Location within the United States
- Location: 105 Highland Dr., Penn Yan, New York
- Coordinates: 42°39′52″N 77°3′49″W
- Area: 1.8 acres (0.73 ha)
- Built: 1825
- Architectural style: Tudor Revival
- MPS: Yates County MPS
- NRHP reference No.: 94000946
- Added to NRHP: August 24, 1994

Roderick M. Morrison House, also known as Morrison-Wagener House, is a historic home located at Milo Center in Yates County, New York. It is a Roman Classical style structure built about 1825.

It was listed on the National Register of Historic Places in 1994.

Morrison was a lawyer from Virginia who moved to the area. George Wagner, the third owner of the home, is believed to have constructed the "secondary" wooden home attached to the main home's structure.
