= United States Post Office (Penn Yan, New York) =

- US Post Office-Penn Yan
- U.S. National Register of Historic Places
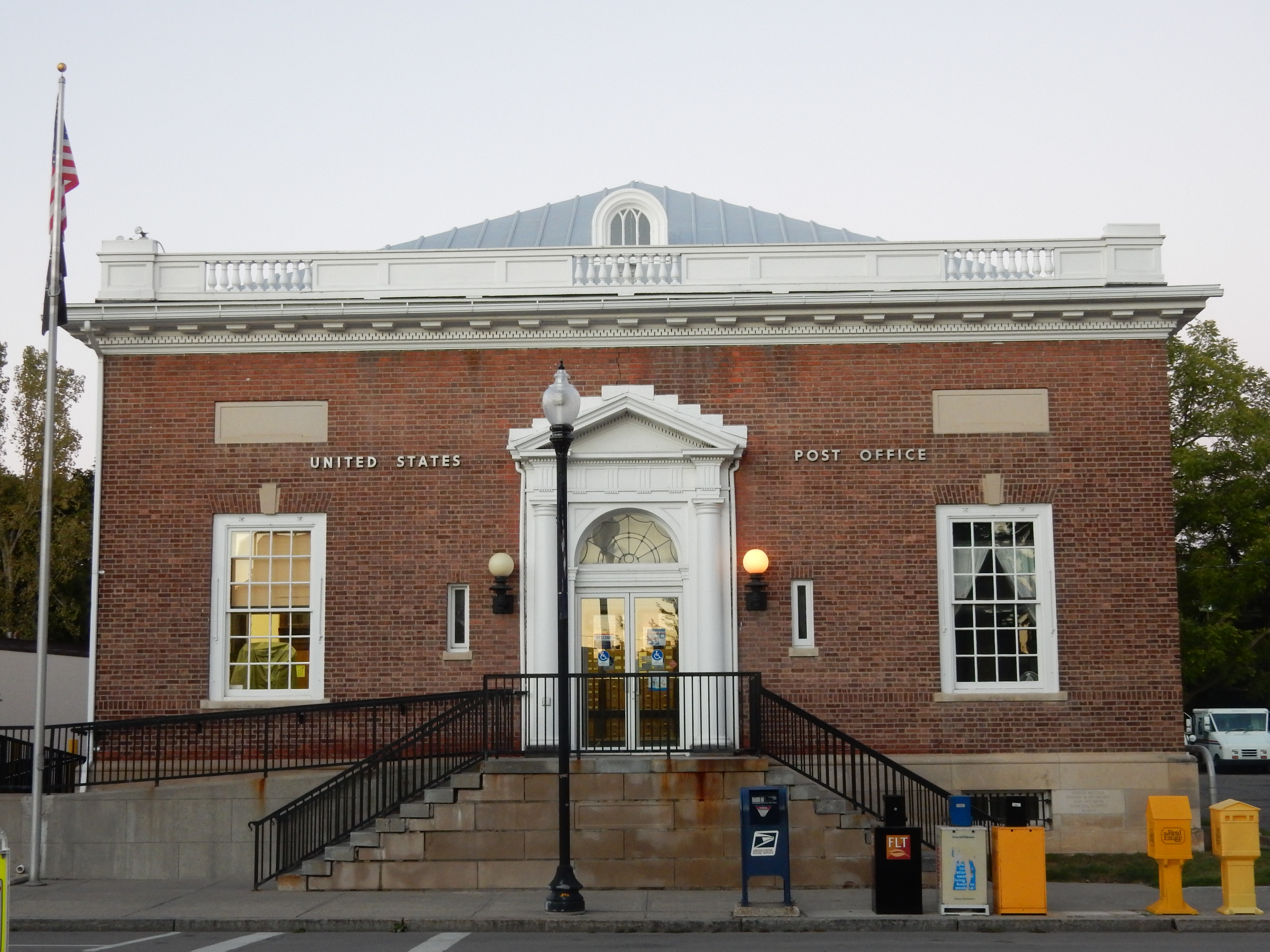
- Historic U.S. Post Office in Penn Yan.

- Location within New York Location within the United States
- Location: 159 Main St., Penn Yan, New York
- Coordinates: 42°39′44″N 77°3′16″W
- Area: less than one acre
- Built: 1912
- Architect: Taylor, James Knox; US Treasury Department
- Architectural style: Colonial Revival
- MPS: US Post Offices in New York State, 1858–1943, TR
- NRHP reference No.: 88002403
- Added to NRHP: May 11, 1989

US Post Office-Penn Yan is a historic post office building located at Penn Yan in Yates County, New York. It was designed and built in 1912–1913 and is one of a number of post offices in New York State designed by the Office of the Supervising Architect of the Treasury Department, James Knox Taylor. It is a symmetrically massed, 1 1/2-story red brick structure on a granite-clad raised basement in the Colonial Revival style. It is a contributing element in the Penn Yan Historic District.

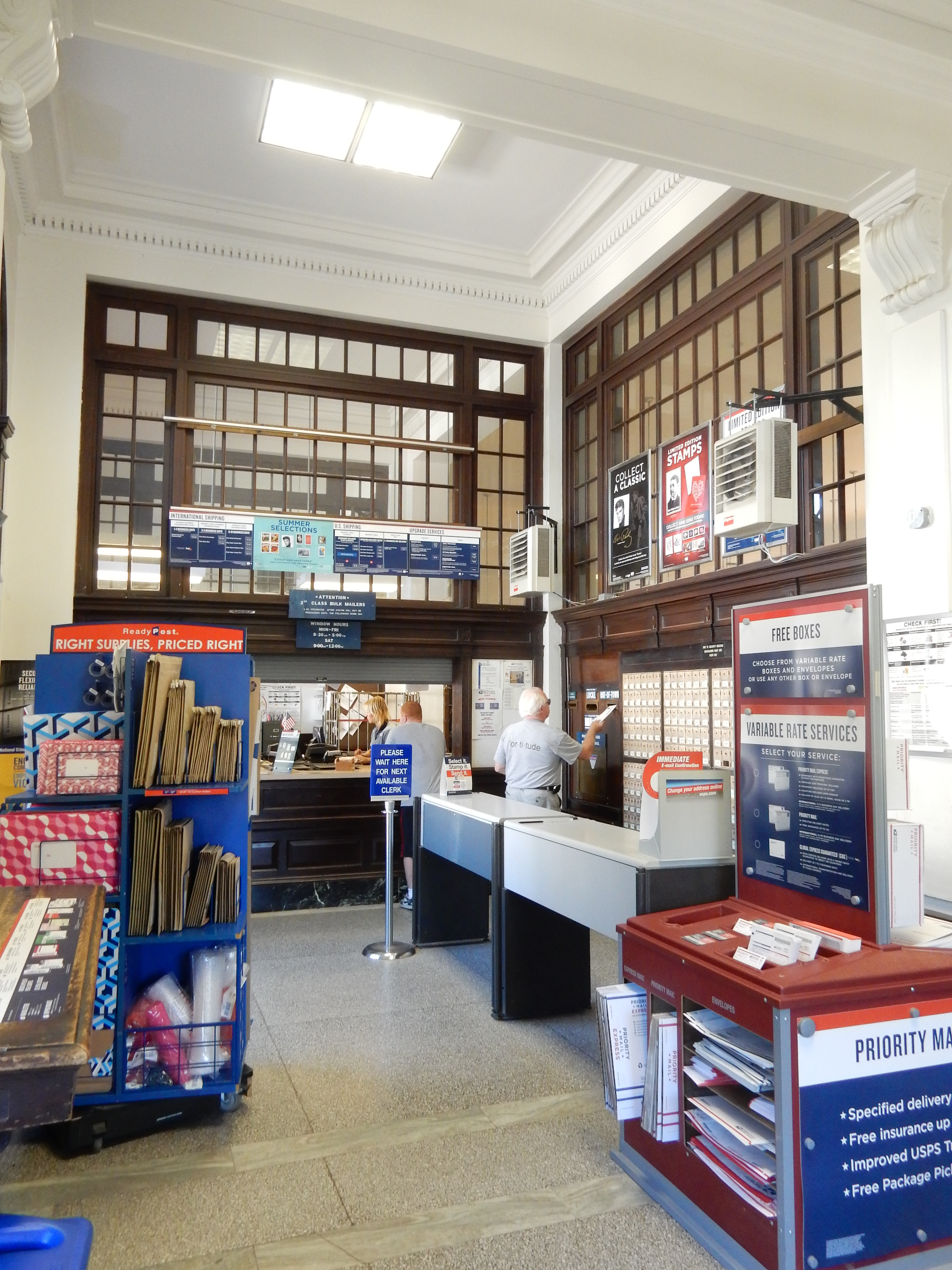
Interior of the Post Office.

It was listed on the National Register of Historic Places in 1989.
