= Penn Yan Historic District =

Historic district in New York, United States

- U.S. National Register of Historic Places
- U.S. Historic district
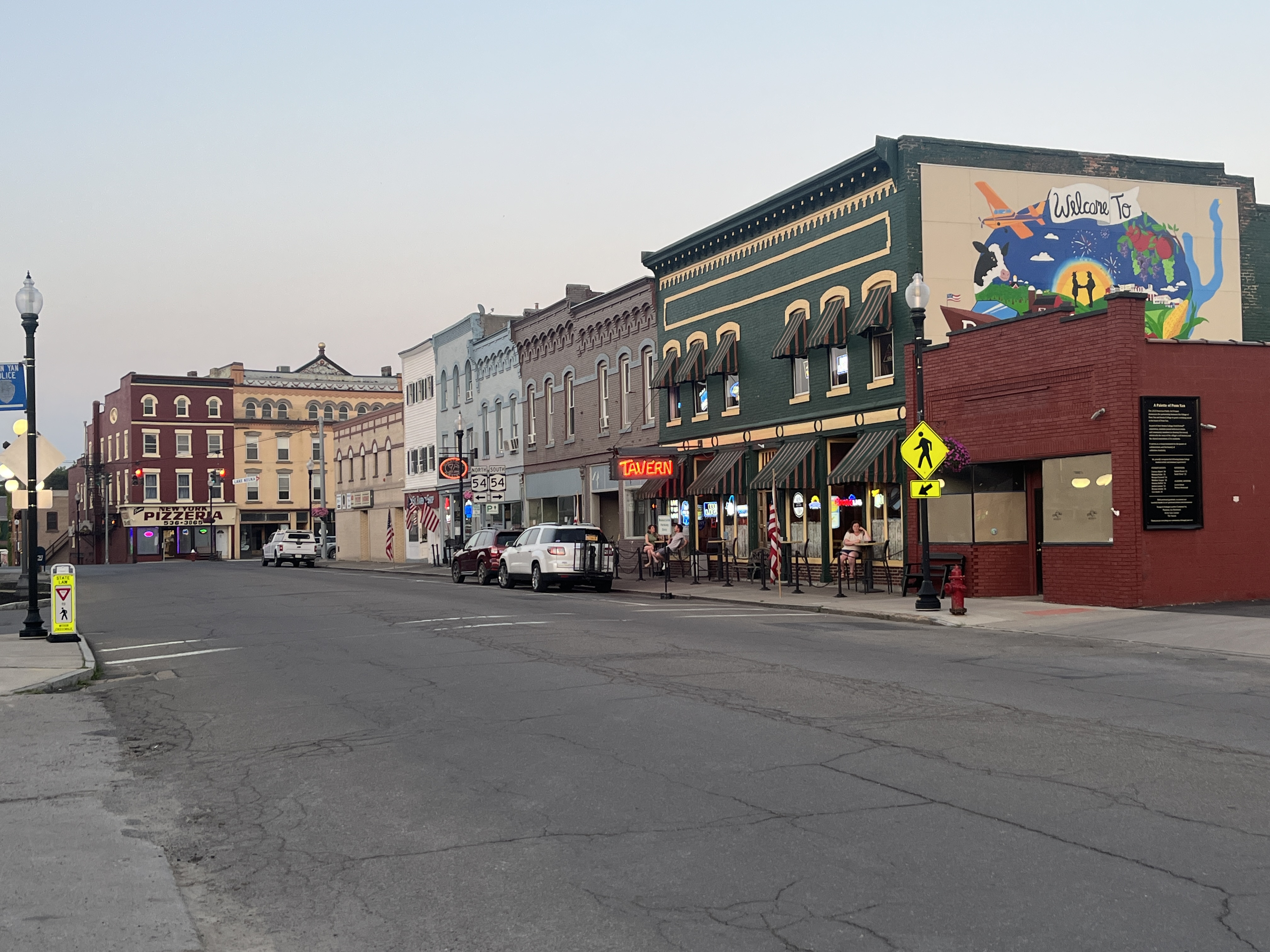
- Penn Yan Historic District, 2025

- Location within New York Location within the United States
- Location: Roughly bounded by Water, Seneca, Elm, Wagener, Court, Clinton, North and Main Sts., Penn Yan, New York
- Coordinates: 42°39′49″N 77°3′8″W
- Area: 65 acres (26 ha)
- Built: 1820
- Architect: Multiple
- Architectural style: Mid 19th Century Revival, Late 19th And 20th Century Revivals, Late Victorian
- NRHP reference No.: 85000591
- Added to NRHP: March 14, 1985

Penn Yan Historic District is a national historic district located at Penn Yan in Yates County, New York. The district consists of 65 acres (26 ha) and contains 281 structures, 210 of which are contributing. It includes a broad range of architecturally significant resources that document the village's development from the 1820s to 1929. It includes representative examples of residential, commercial, industrial, civic, and ecclesiastical structures. Highlights include the Birkett Mills, the Chronicle Building, Knapp Hotel, and the Castner House. Located within the boundaries of the district are the separately listed Yates County Courthouse Park District and the U.S. Post Office building (1912–1913).

It was listed on the National Register of Historic Places in 1985.

== Gallery ==
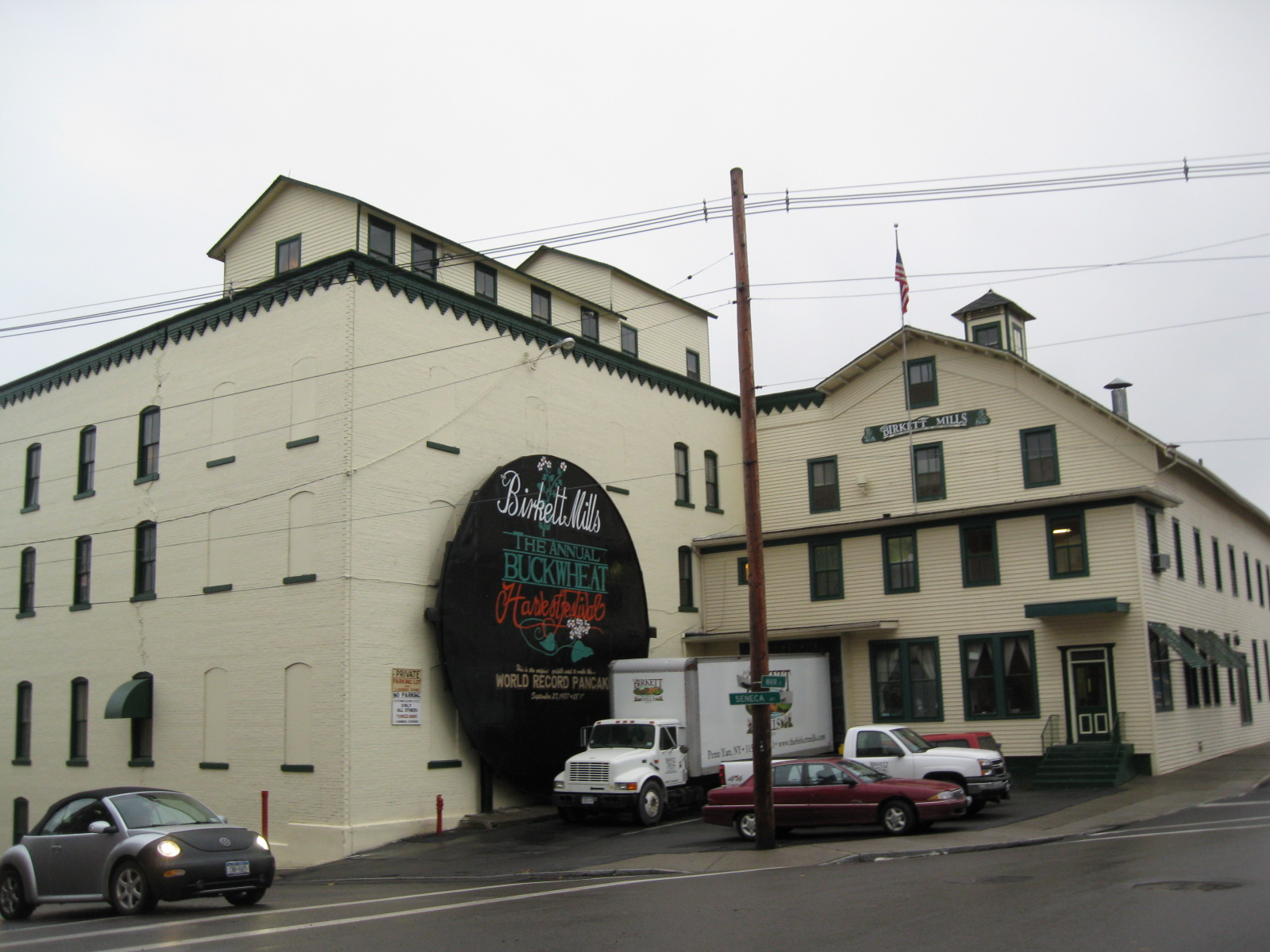
Birkett Mills.

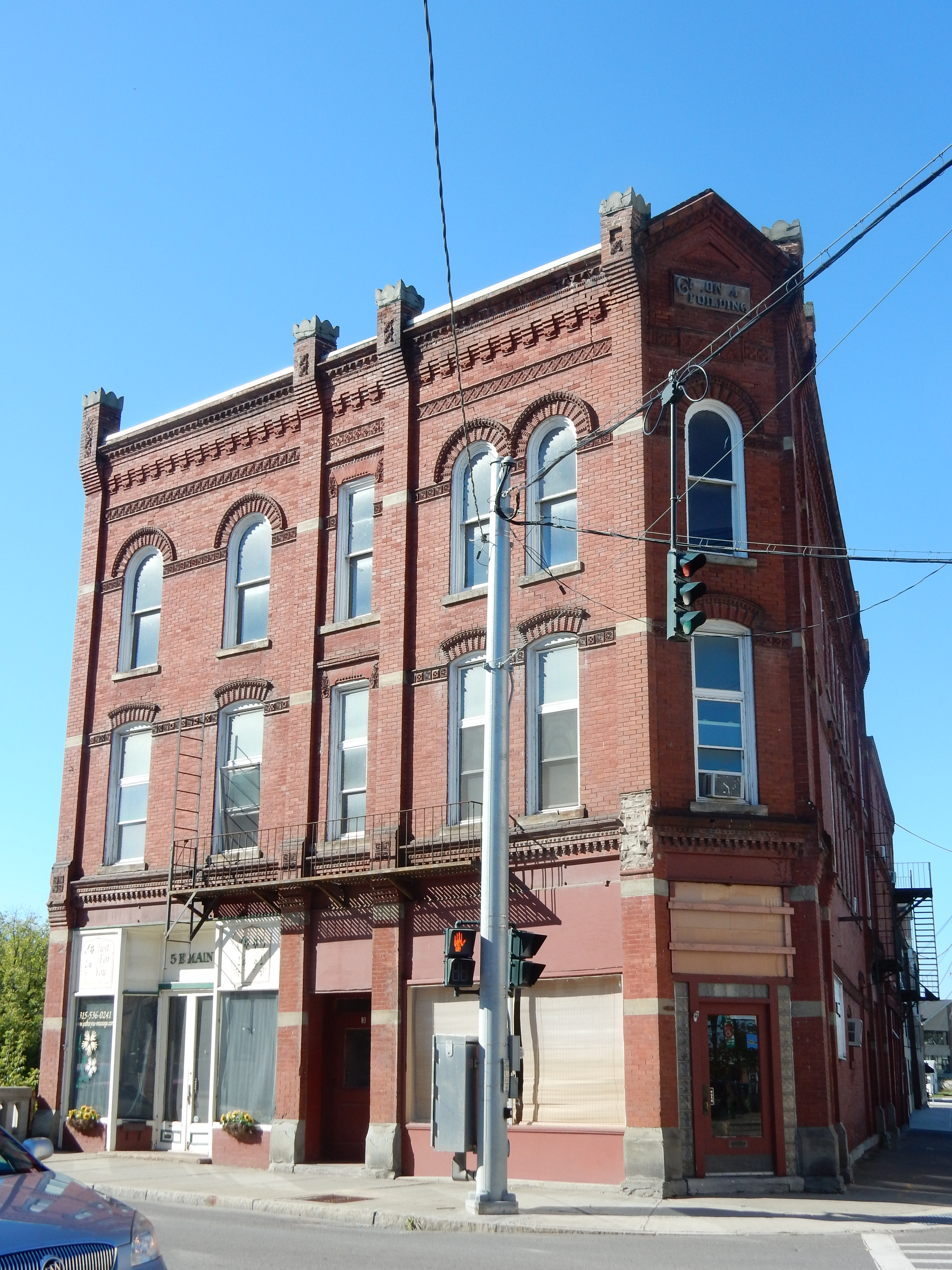
Chronicle Building.

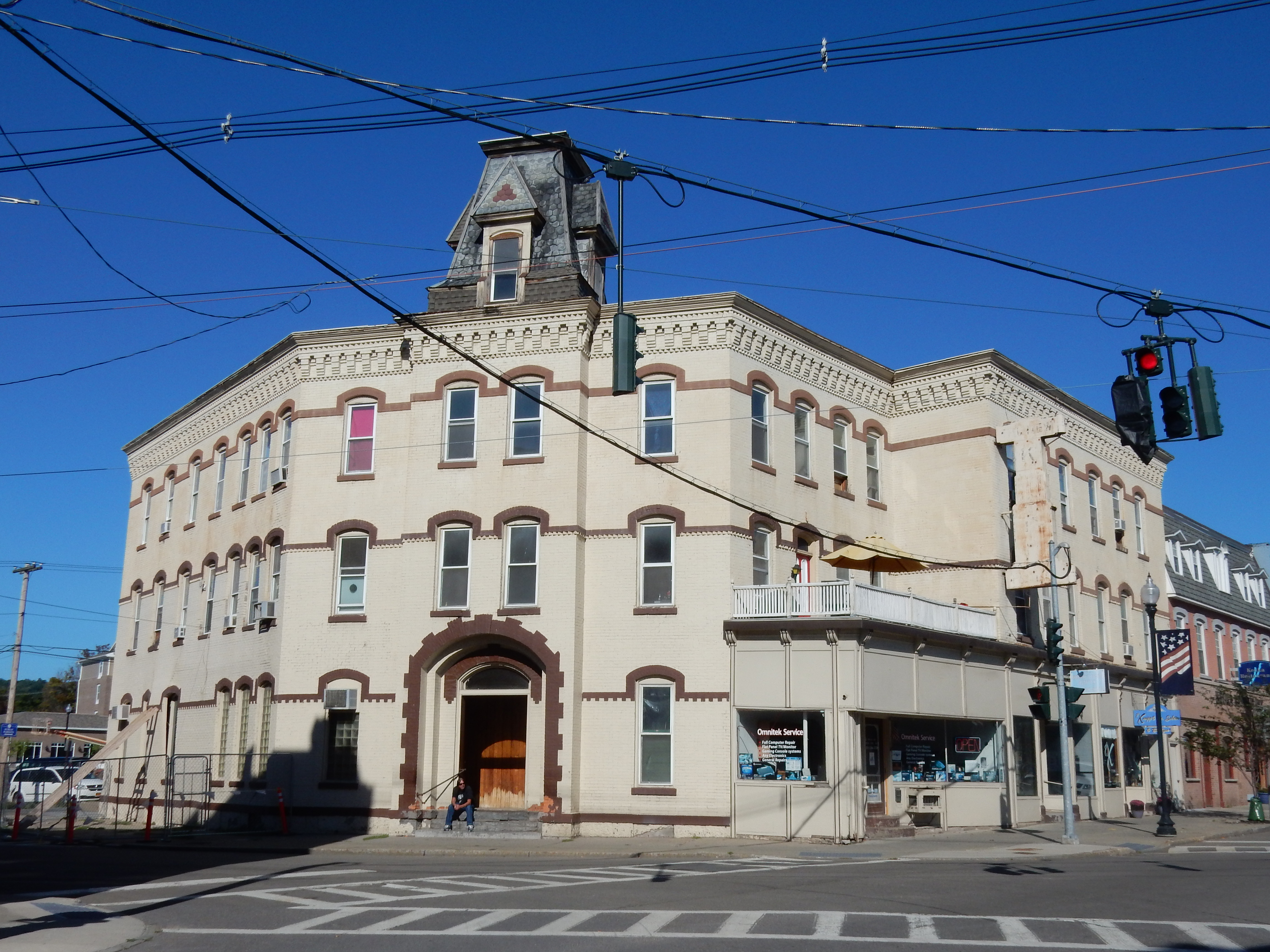
Knapp Hotel.

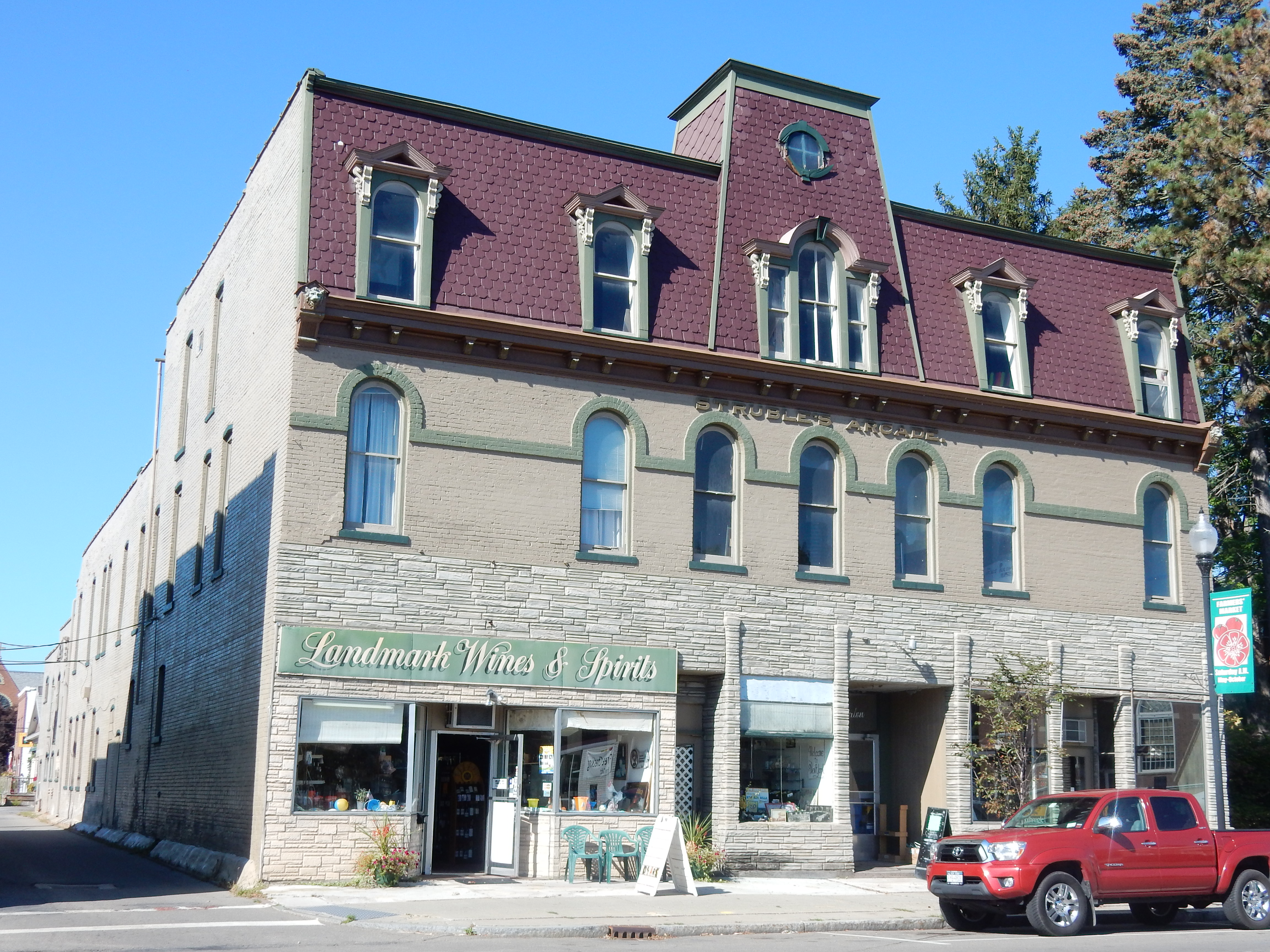
Struble's Arcade on Main Street.
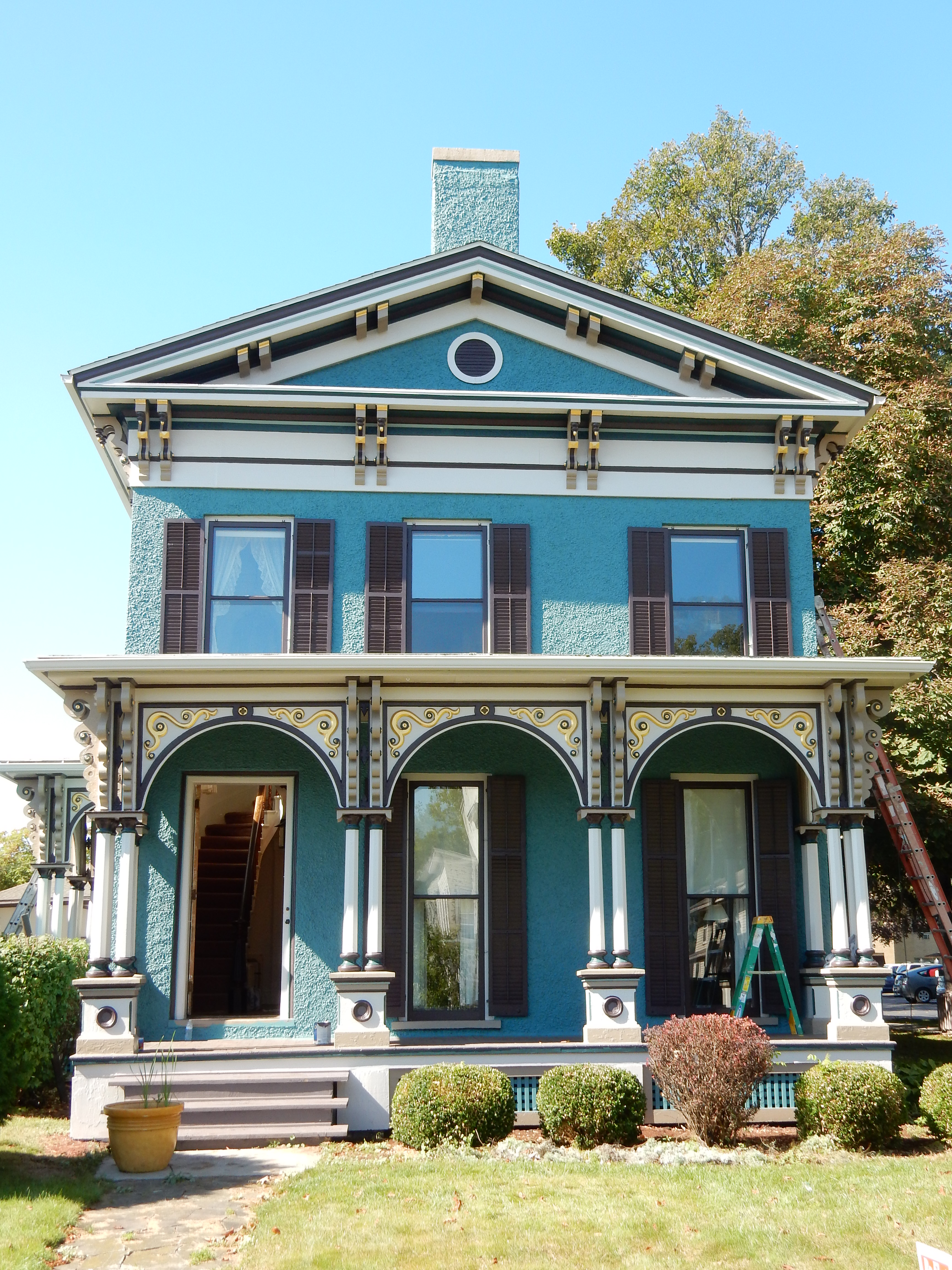
Lawrence House.

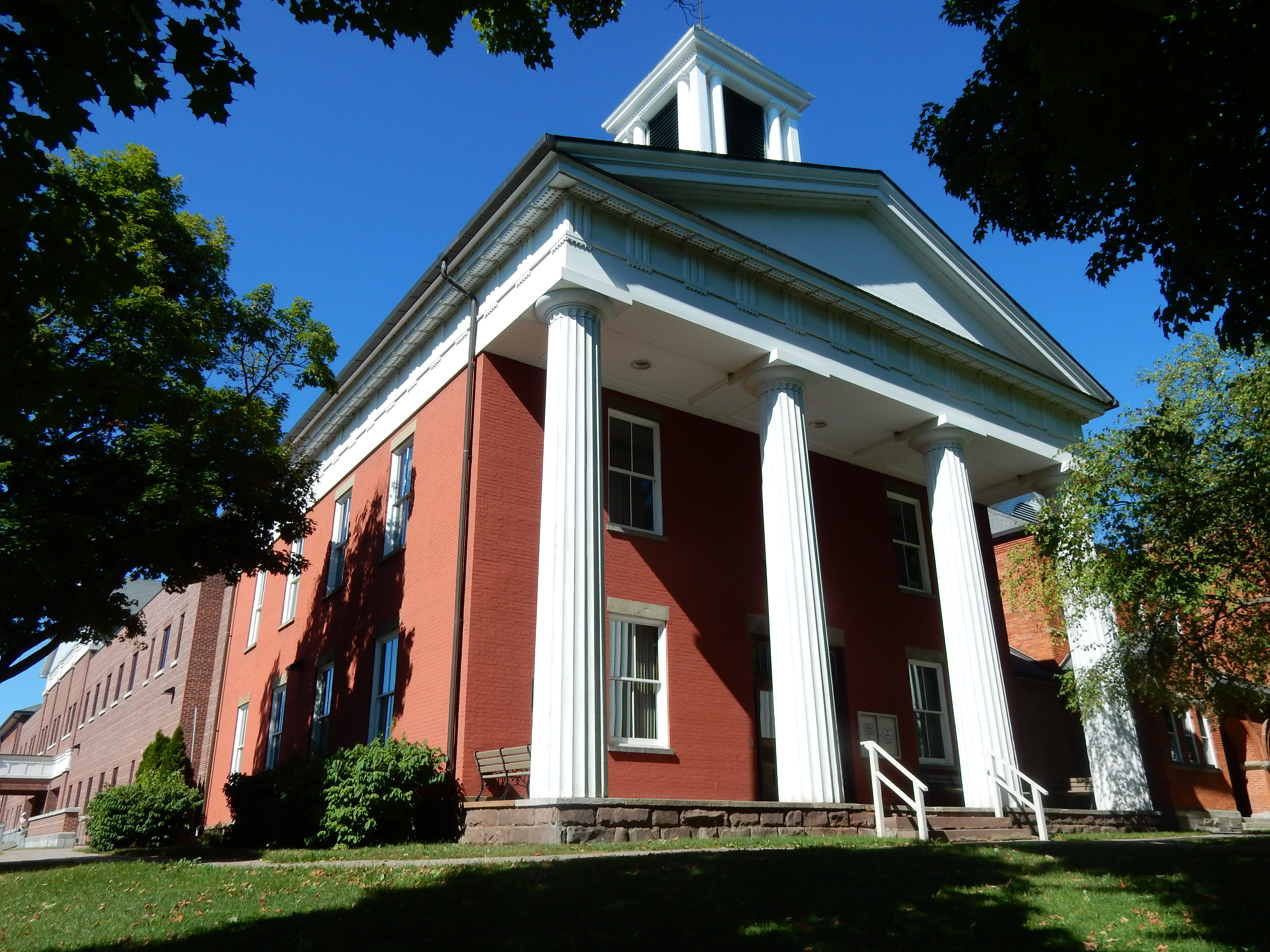
Yates County Courthouse.

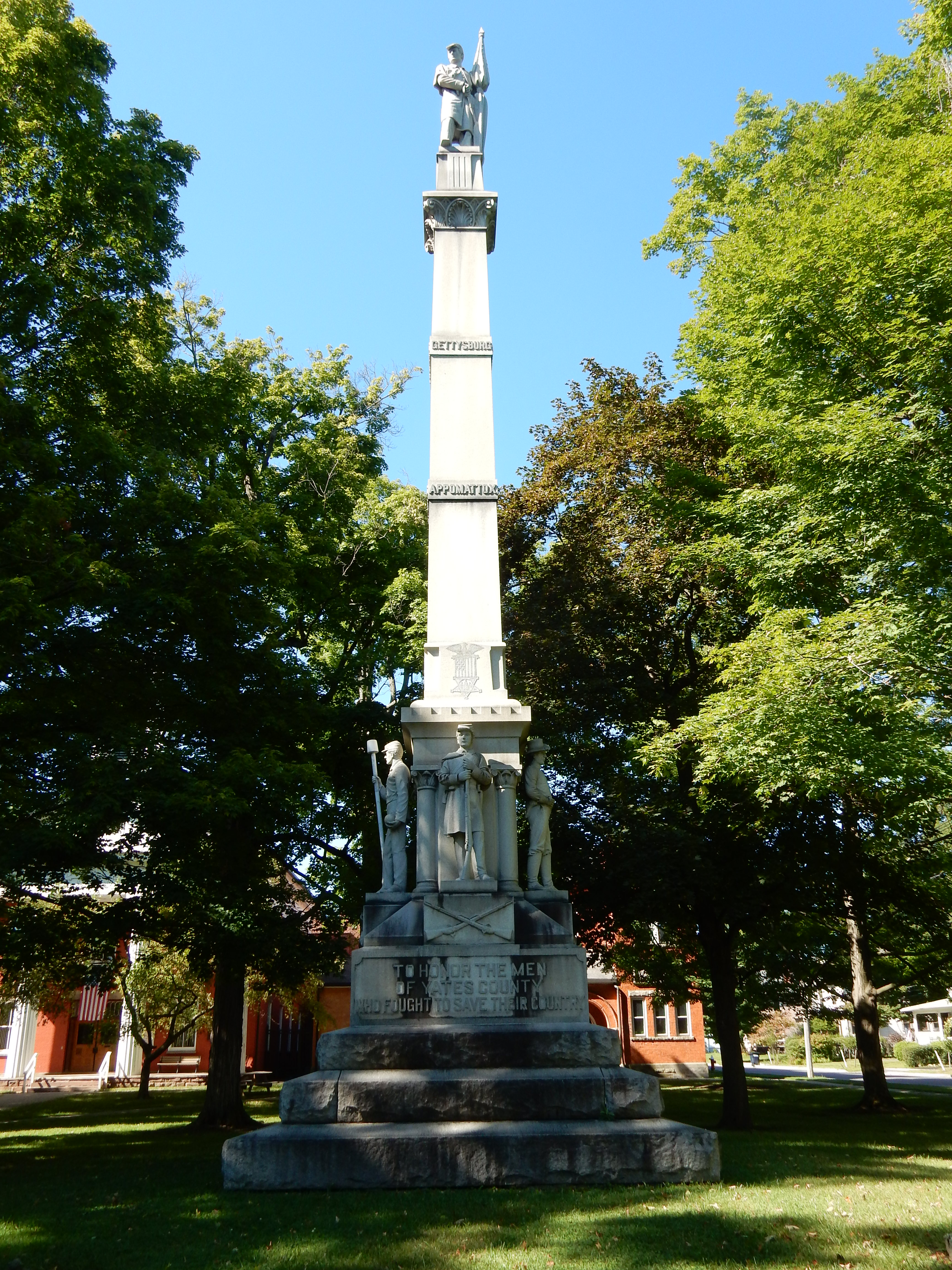
Civil War Memorial.

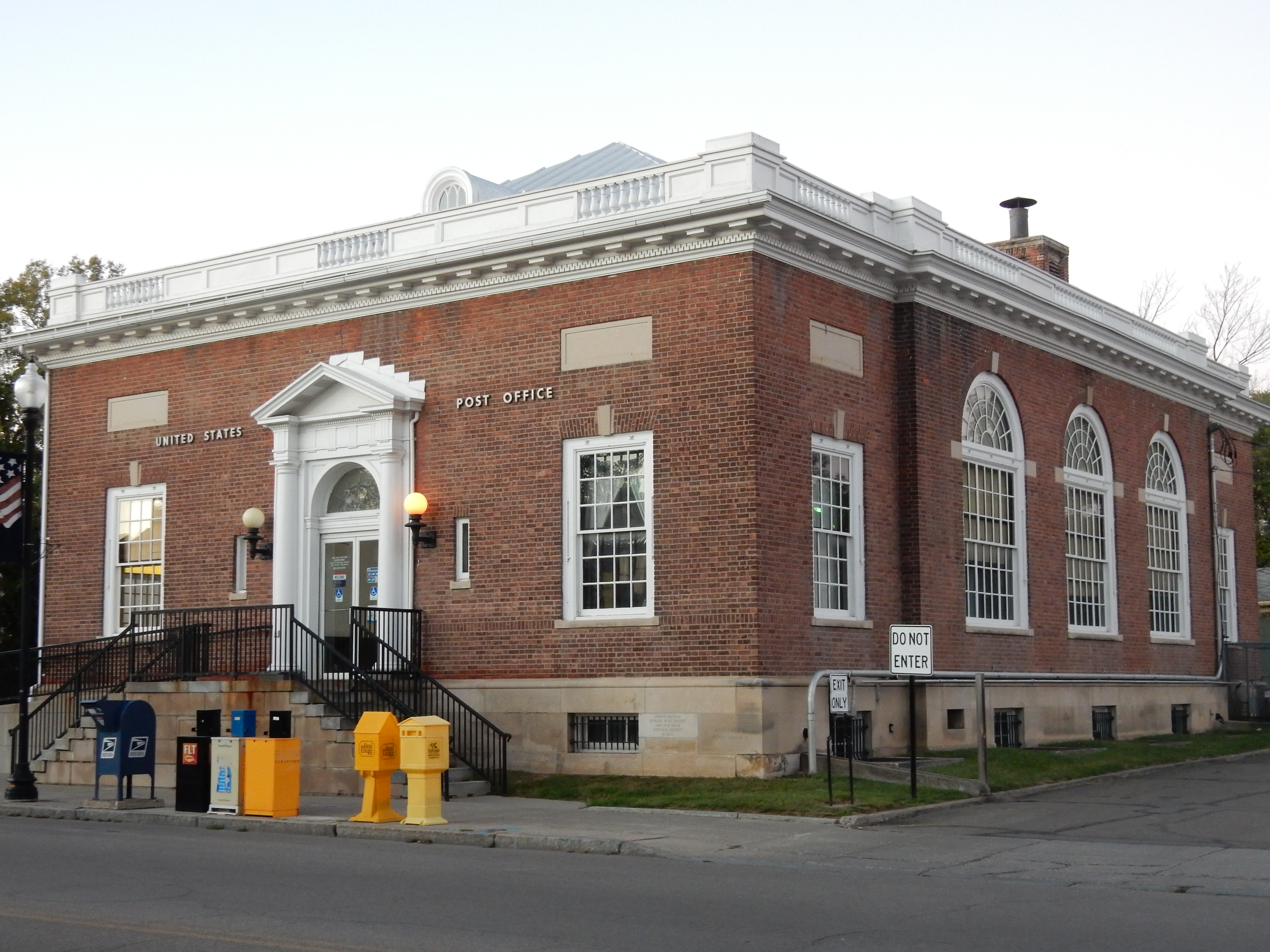
Penn Yan Post Office.
