= Yates County Courthouse Park District =

Historic district in New York, United States

- U.S. National Register of Historic Places
- U.S. Historic district
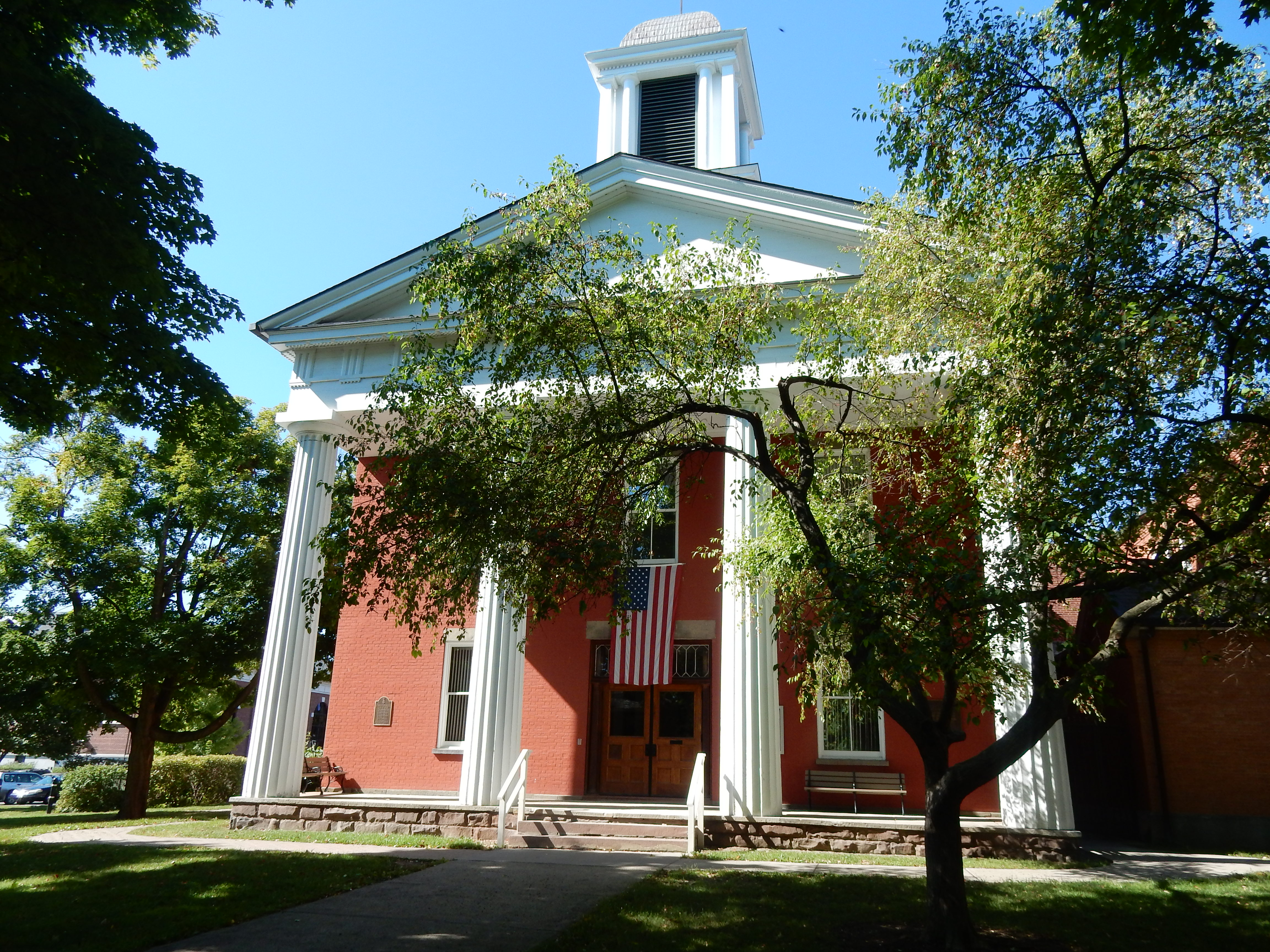
- Yates County Courthouse. September 2015.

- Location within New York Location within the United States
- Interactive map showing the location for Yates County Courthouse Park District
- Location: Main, Court and Liberty Sts., Penn Yan, New York
- Coordinates: 42°39′54″N 77°3′28″W
- Area: 2 acres (0.81 ha)
- Built: 1835
- Architect: Multiple
- Architectural style: Greek Revival, Pueblo, Romanesque
- NRHP reference No.: 79001652
- Added to NRHP: June 19, 1979

Yates County Courthouse Park District is a national historic district located at Penn Yan in Yates County, New York. The district consists of two acres and contains the Yates County Courthouse, First Baptist Church, the County Office Building, the Old Jail, and the Courthouse Park. The park includes a Civil War monument to the 2,109 county soldiers who served in the war.

It was listed on the National Register of Historic Places in 1979 and, since 1985, has been contained entirely within the larger Penn Yan Historic District.

== Gallery ==
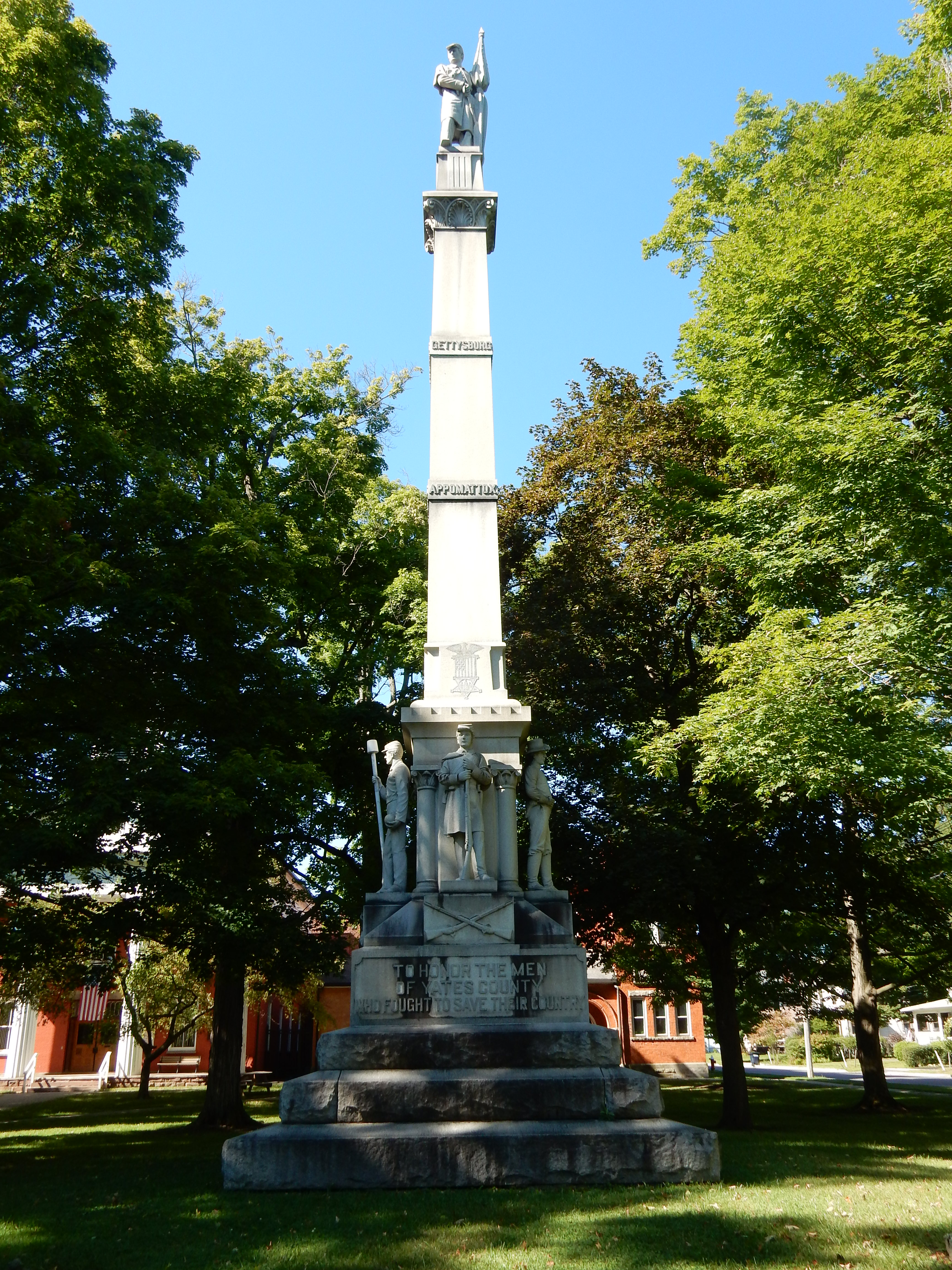
Civil War Memorial.

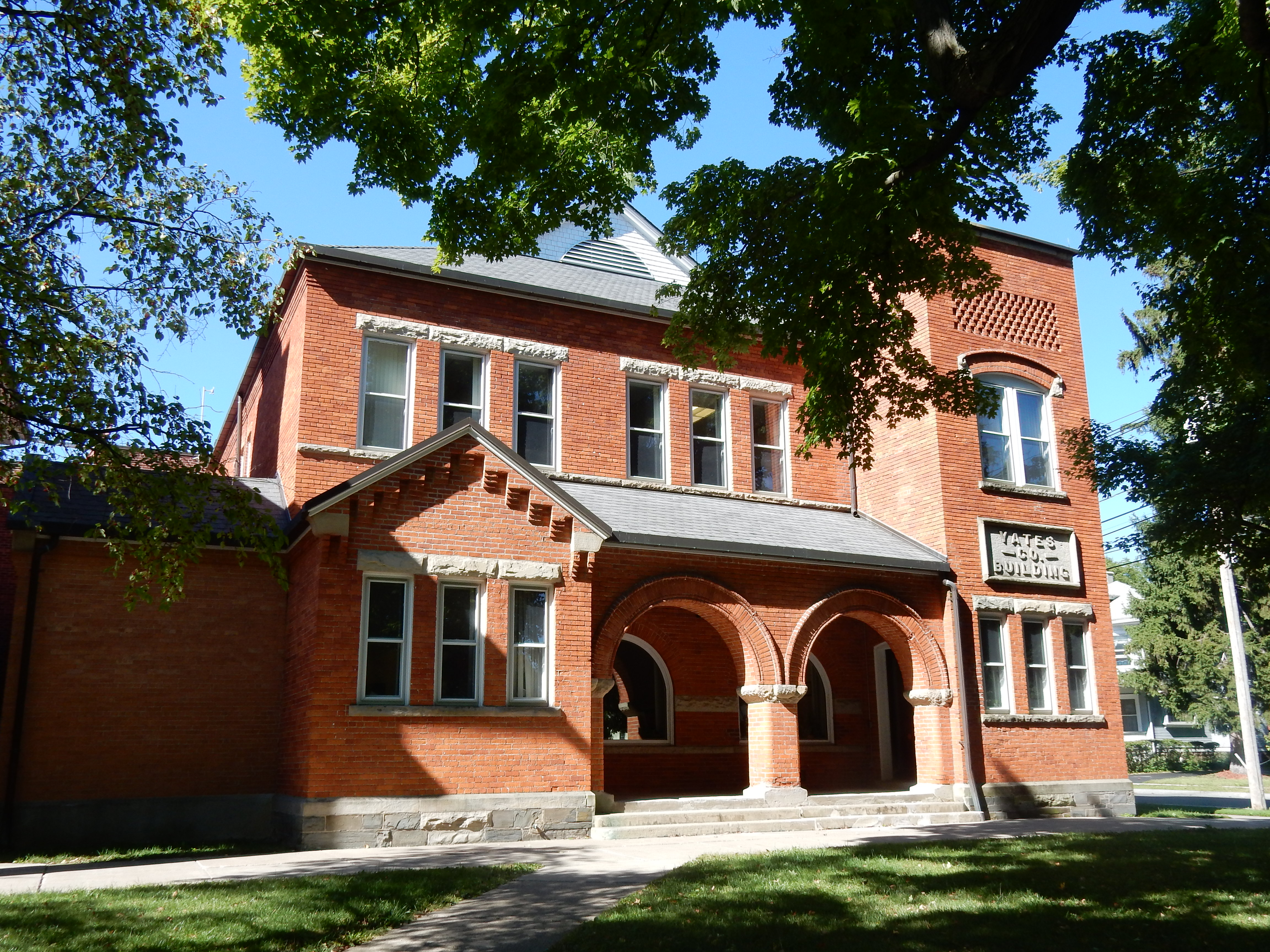
County Office Building.

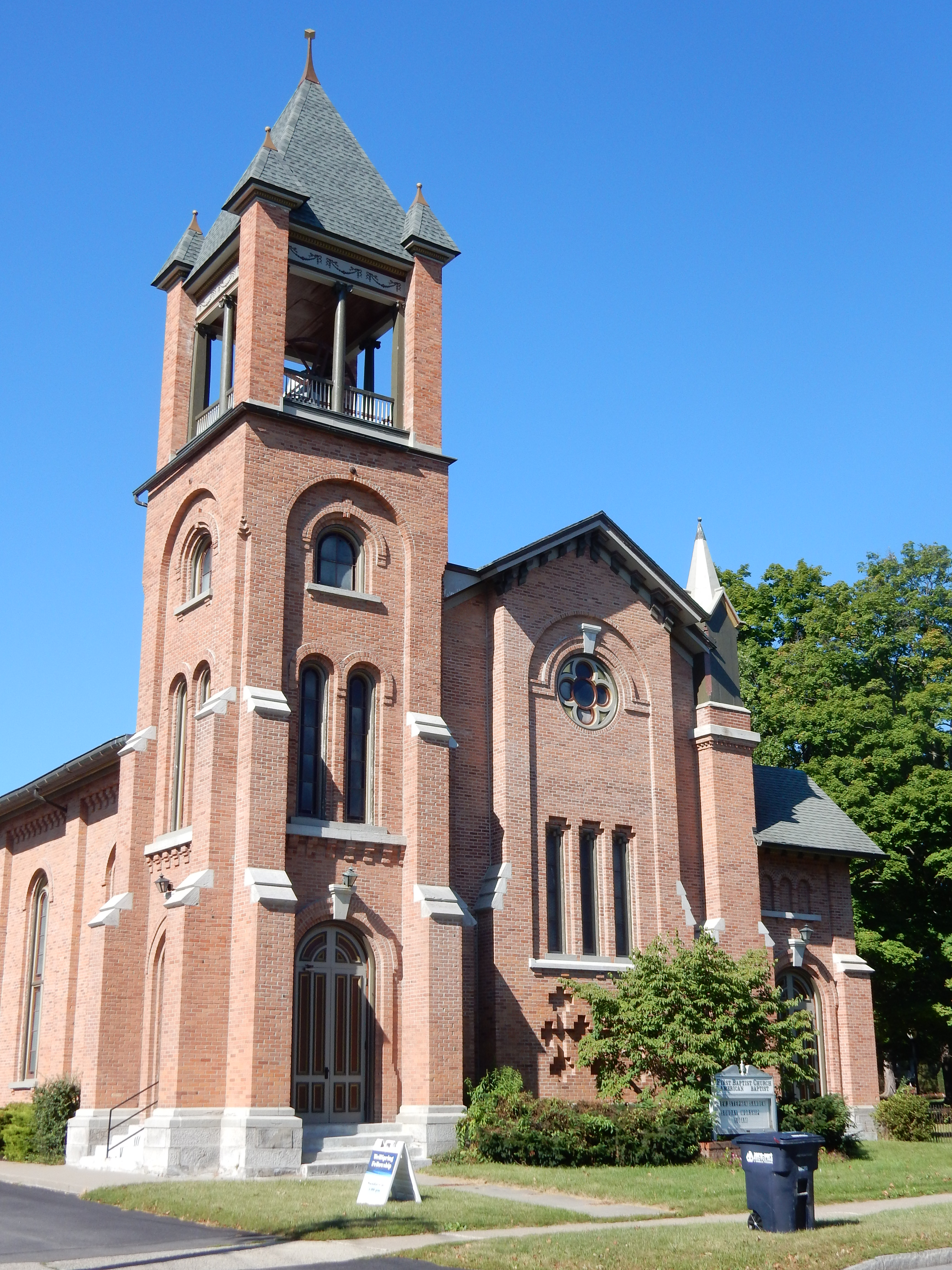
Penn Yan First Baptist Church.
