= Sampson Theatre =

- U.S. National Register of Historic Places
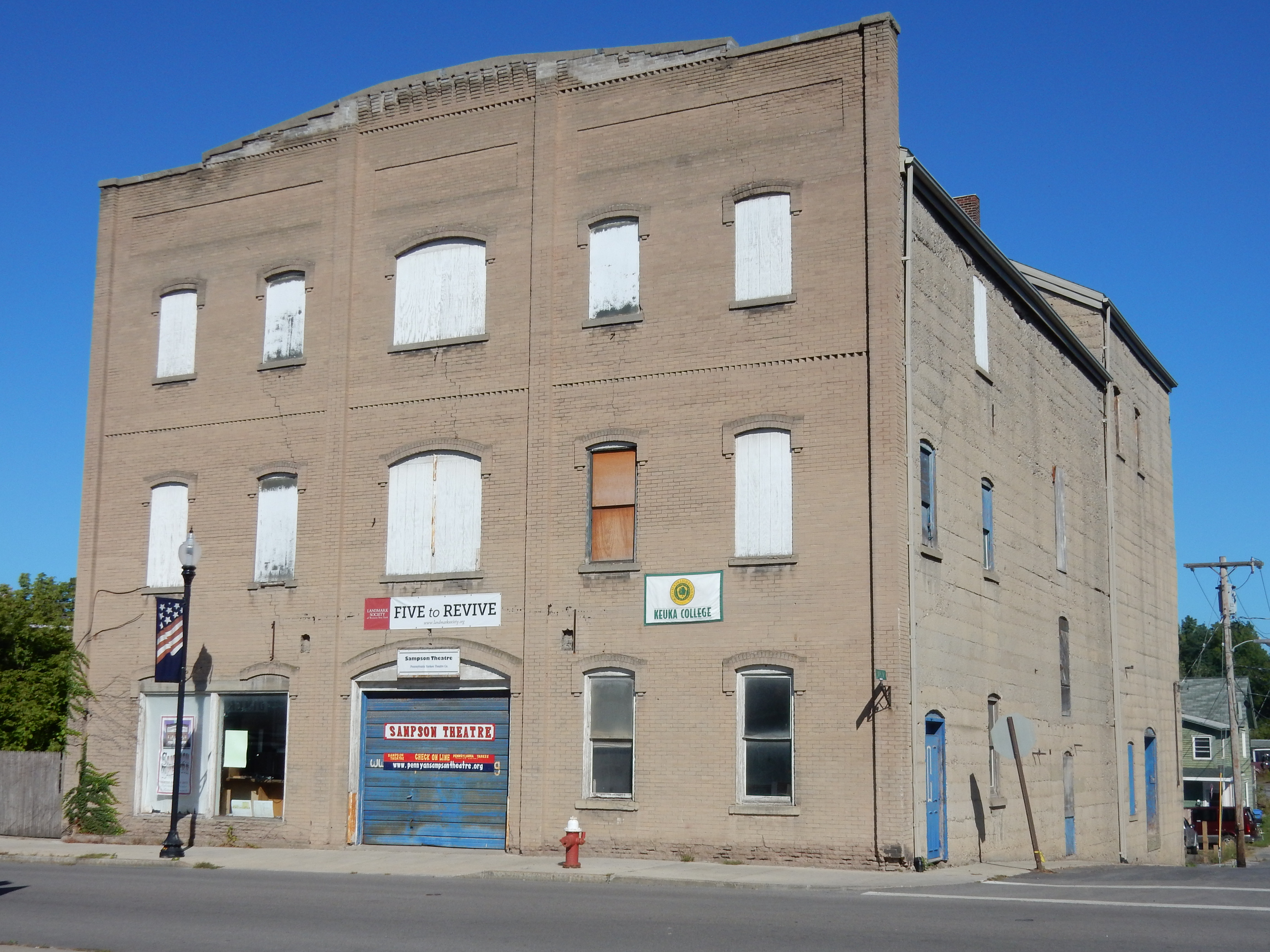
- Sampson Theatre. September 2015.

- Location within New York Location within the United States
- Location: 130-136 E. Elm St., Penn Yan, New York
- Coordinates: 42°39′48″N 77°3′8″W
- Area: 1 acre (0.40 ha)
- Built: 1910
- Architectural style: Late 19th And Early 20th Century American Movements
- NRHP reference No.: 08001035
- Added to NRHP: November 7, 2008

Sampson Theatre is a historic theater building located at Penn Yan in Yates County, New York, United States. It was built in 1910, and is a three-story, poured in place, concrete building. It measures 60 feet wide and 100 feet deep and consists of two sections; a front auditorium section and a rear stage section. Both sections are covered by gambrel roofs. The theater was originally used for vaudeville and as a movie theater. In 1929, it was converted for use as a miniature golf course, and later was used as a warehouse for tires.

It was listed on the National Register of Historic Places in 2008.
