= Penn Yan, New York =

- Village
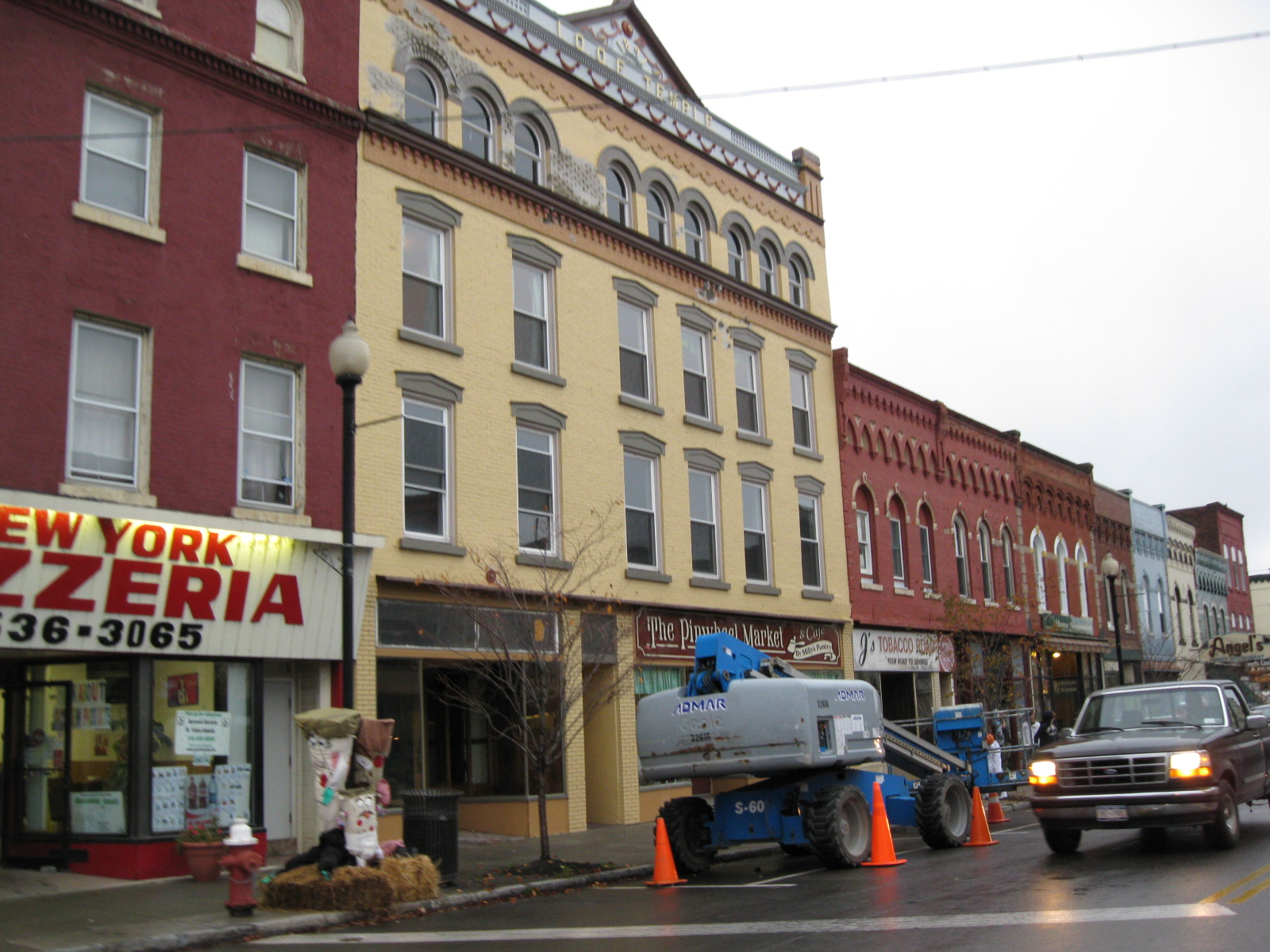
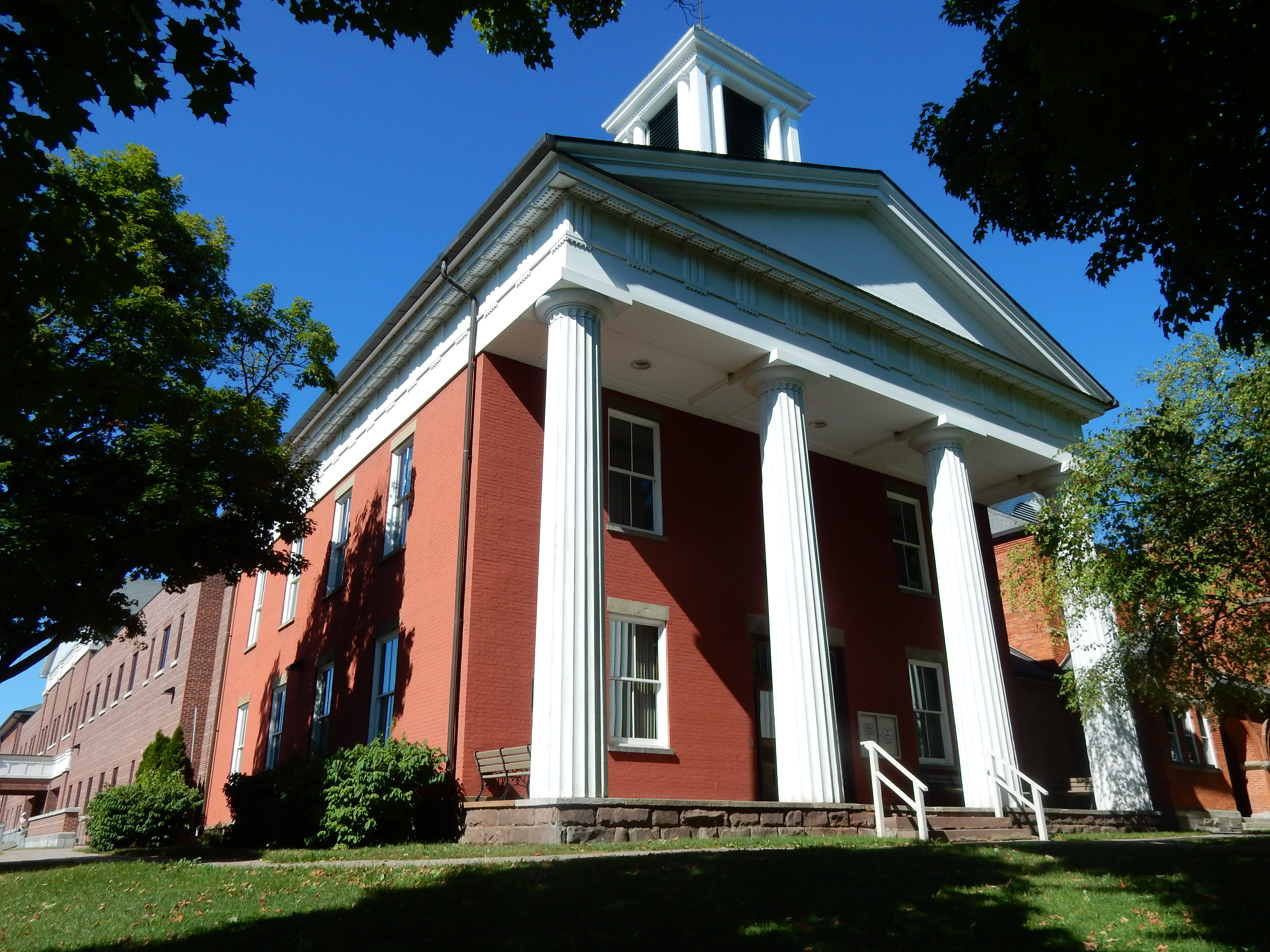
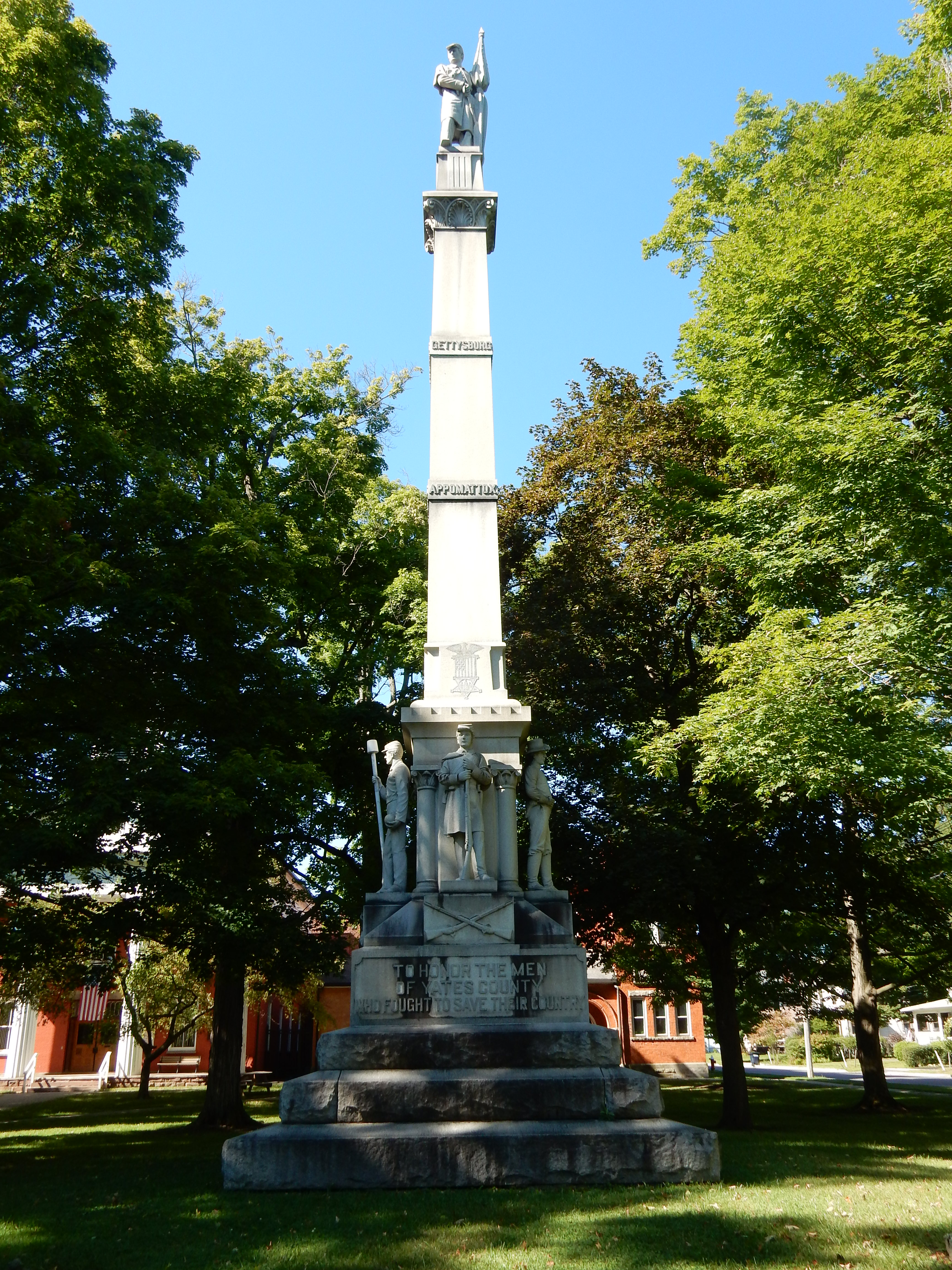
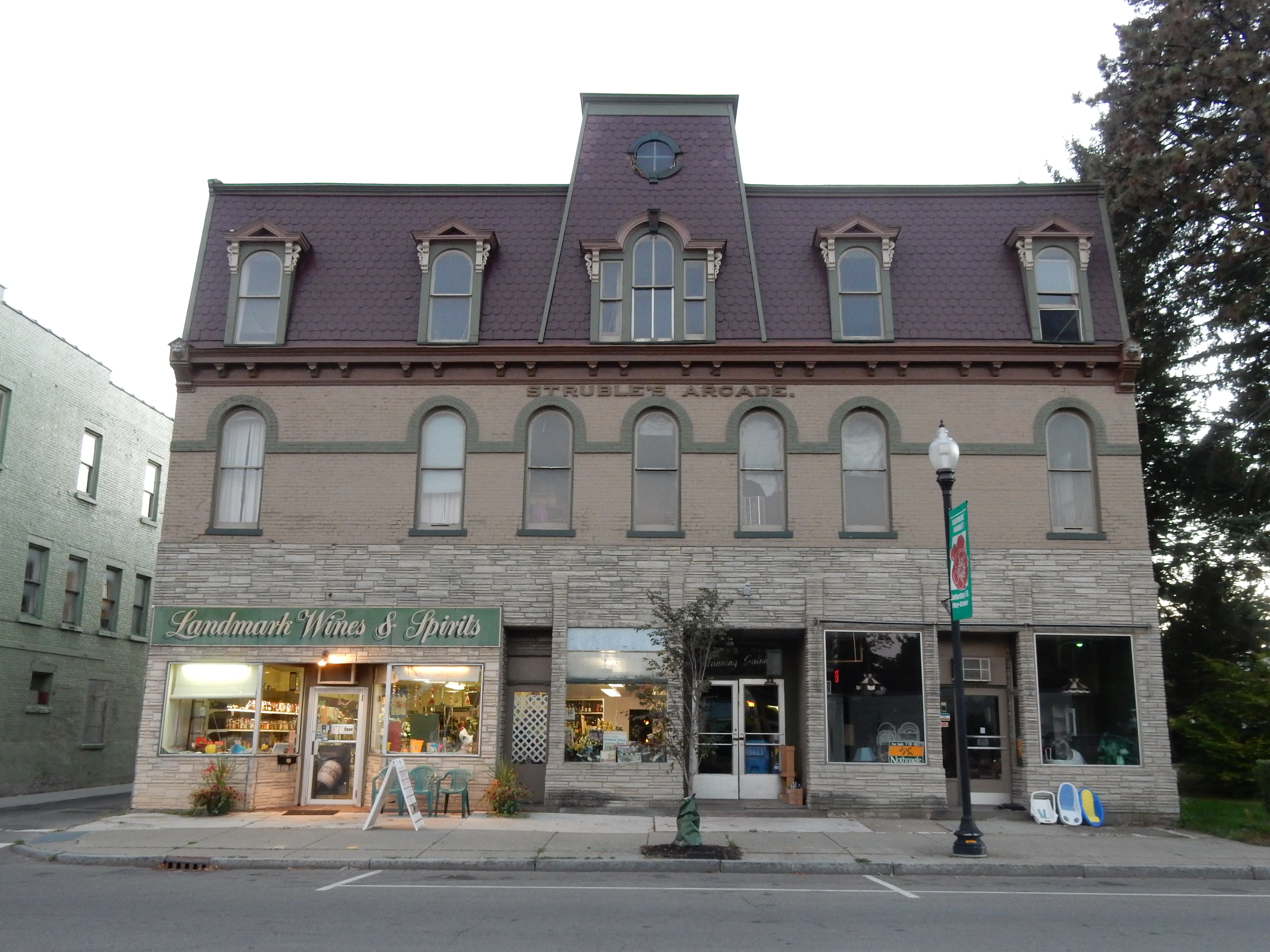
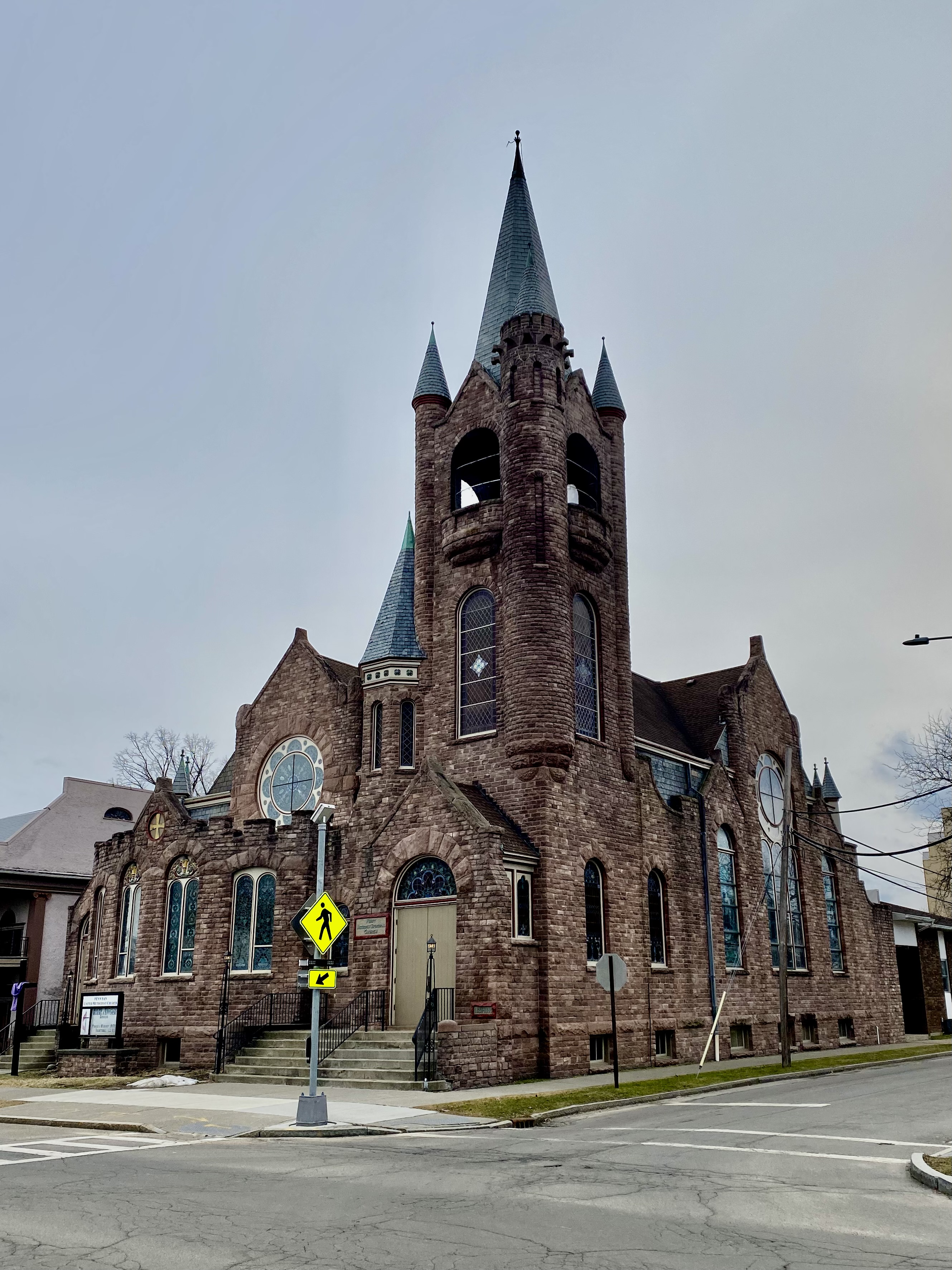
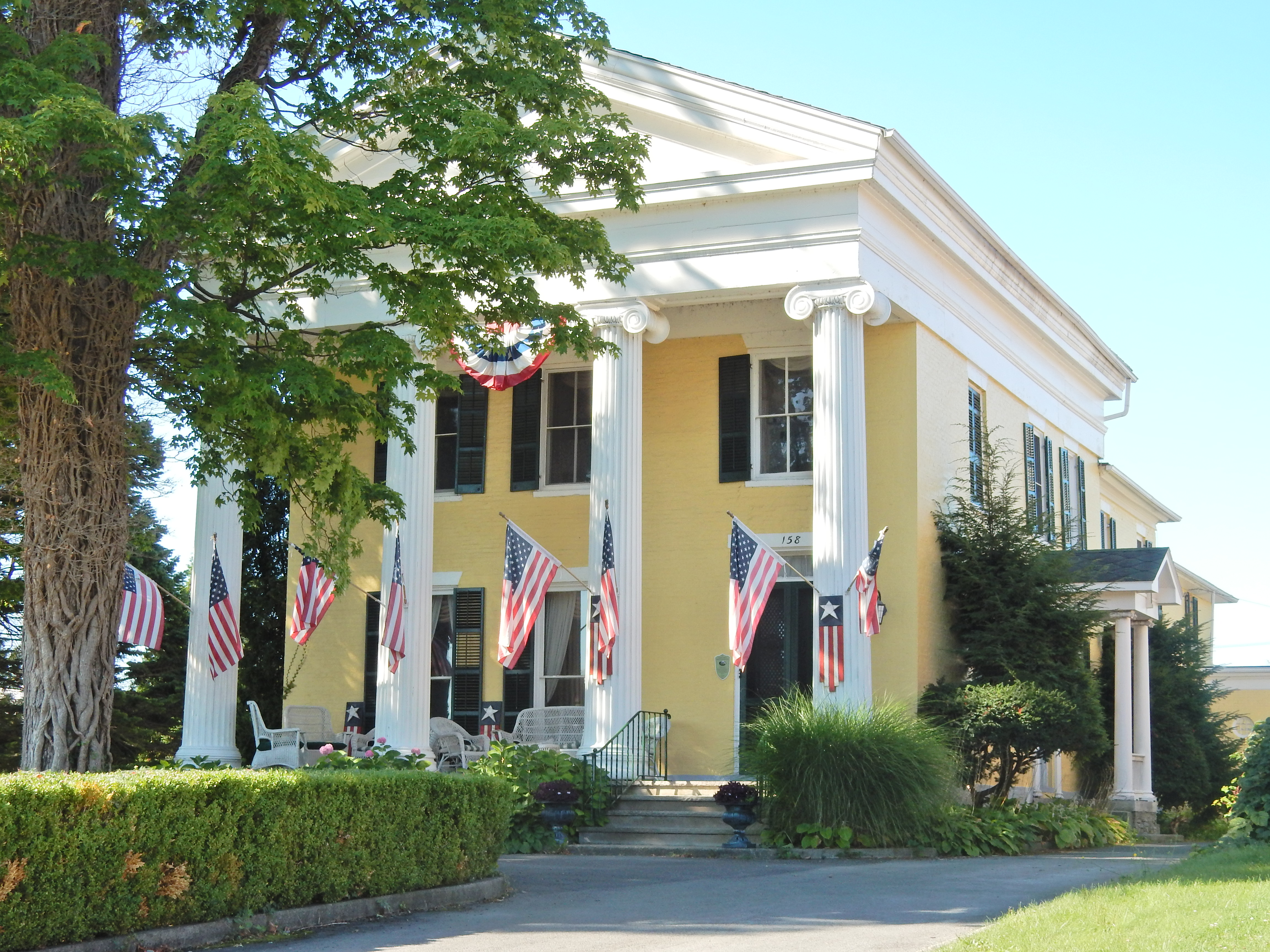
- Penn Yan Historic District Yates County Courthouse Civil War Memorial Struble's Arcade Methodist Church on Chapel Street Oliver-Fox House

- Emblem

- Location in Yates County and the state of New York.
- Coordinates: 42°39′36″N 77°3′20″W
- Country: United States
- State: New York
- County: Yates
- Settled: 1799
- Incorporated: 1833
- Named for: "Pennsylvania Yankee"

Area
  - Total: 2.46 sq mi (6.36 km^{2})
  - Land: 2.40 sq mi (6.22 km^{2})
  - Water: 0.058 sq mi (0.15 km^{2})
- Elevation: 728 ft (222 m)

Population (2020)
  - Total: 5,056
  - Density: 2,106.5/sq mi (813.32/km^{2})
- Time zone: UTC-5 (Eastern (EST))
  - Summer (DST): UTC-4 (EDT)
- ZIP code: 14527
- Area code: 315
- FIPS code: 36-57177
- GNIS feature ID: 0960144
- Website: www.villageofpennyan.gov

Penn Yan is an incorporated village in and the county seat of Yates County, New York, United States. As of the 2020 census, Penn Yan had a population of 5,056. It lies at the north end of the east branch of Keuka Lake, one of the Finger Lakes.

As tourism has grown in the Finger Lakes, Penn Yan has become a summertime hub for visitors to local vineyards, breweries, and Mennonite craft markets. Since the 1970s, farmland in Yates County has been increasingly purchased by Mennonite families from Lancaster County, Pennsylvania. Today, Penn Yan is the center of the largest Old Order Mennonite community in New York State, and horse-drawn buggies are a common sight in the village.

The village is home to The Birkett Mills, founded in 1797, one of the oldest mills in the United States and among the largest buckwheat manufacturers, earning Penn Yan the title of the "Buckwheat Capital of America." During the 1987 Annual Buckwheat Harvest Festival, a 28-foot griddle was used to cook what was then the world's largest pancake.

The Village of Penn Yan is primarily in the Town of Milo, but a small section is in the Town of Benton. A smaller section is in the Town of Jerusalem. The Penn Yan Airport is south of the village. The name "Penn Yan" is a syllabic abbreviation of "Pennsylvania Yankee". It houses the Penn Yan Central School District.

== History ==
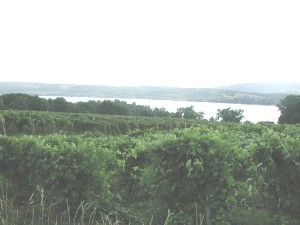
Vineyard near Keuka Lake, Penn Yan, New York

The Penn Yan area was home to several Seneca villages until their destruction in the 1779 Sullivan Expedition, after which most of the Seneca population fled westward. The Seneca leader Red Jacket grew up on Keuka Lake. The first white settlers in Western New York were the followers of the Public Universal Friend, a religious enthusiast born in Cumberland, Providence County, Rhode Island, who obtained a large tract for a settlement (called Jerusalem in 1789) in the present Yates County, and founded the village of Hopeton on the outlet of Keuka Lake, approximately one mile from Seneca Lake. Many followers settled there, and lived there after 1790, but the community gradually broke up.

The first frame dwelling at Penn Yan was built in 1799. The village became the county seat in 1823, when Yates County was created. It was incorporated in 1833.

Penn Yan, the name of the village, is said to have been contrived from the first syllables of "Pennsylvania" and "Yankee", as most of the early settlers were from Pennsylvania and New England; the latter were known as Yankees. It became a trading center for the agricultural county, with mills for lumber, buckwheat and other grains. The village was the western terminus of the former Crooked Lake Canal.

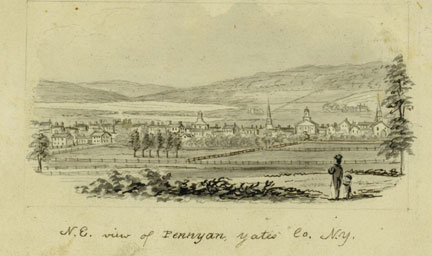
N.E. view of PENNYAN, Yates Co., N.Y. (circa 1856–1860) by John Warner Barber

Historical Map of Yates County, 1855

In 1921, the Penn Yan Boat Company was founded by German immigrant Charles A. Herrman. It produced wooden and glass-fiber boats until 2001.

During the late 1800s and through the mid-to-late 1900s, Penn Yan and surrounding Yates County areas were home to a large number of dairy farms, many settled by Danish immigrants and their descendants. Even today, names such as Christensen and Jensen are common. Since the late 20th century, Old Order Mennonite and Amish families have settled and taken over farms in the region. Beginning in 1974, many families of the Groffdale Conference Mennonite Church moved to Yates County from Lancaster County, Pennsylvania, seeking cheaper farmland. The Yates County Old Order Mennonites settlement is the largest horse-and-buggy community in the state of New York. There are also several Old Order Amish settlements in adjacent Steuben and Seneca counties, which were founded starting in 1979.

On May 13, 2014, heavy downpours caused severe flash flooding in the area, which ripped out roads as well as destroying at least one commercial building downtown as about five inches of rain fell over a few hours, considered to be at least a 100-year flood.

=== Historic properties ===
The Roderick M. Morrison House, Lake View Cemetery, Crooked Lake Outlet Historic District, Yates County Courthouse Park District, Sampson Theatre, United States Post Office, Charles Wagener House, and Penn Yan Historic District are listed on the National Register of Historic Places.

== Demographics ==
Historical population
Census	Pop.	Note	%±
1860	2,388		—
1870	3,488		46.1%
1880	3,475		−0.4%
1890	4,254		22.4%
1900	4,650		9.3%
1910	4,597		−1.1%
1920	4,517		−1.7%
1930	5,329		18.0%
1940	5,308		−0.4%
1950	5,481		3.3%
1960	5,770		5.3%
1970	5,293		−8.3%
1980	5,242		−1.0%
1990	5,248		0.1%
2000	5,219		−0.6%
2010	5,159		−1.1%
2020	5,056		−2.0%
U.S. Decennial Census

As of the census of 2000, there were 5,219 people, 2,141 households, and 1,261 families residing in the village. The population density was 2,299.7 inhabitants per square mile (887.9/km^{2}). There were 2,299 housing units at an average density of 1,013.1 units per square mile (391.2 units/km^{2}). The racial makeup of the village was 97.15% White, 0.67% African American, 0.27% Native American, 0.31% Asian, 0.06% Pacific Islander, 0.33% from other races, and 1.23% from two or more races. Hispanic or Latino of any race were 0.94% of the population.

There were 2,141 households, out of which 29.2% had children under the age of 18 living with them, 41.2% were married couples living together, 12.8% had a female householder with no husband present, and 41.1% were non-families. 35.1% of all households were made up of individuals, and 18.5% had someone living alone who was 65 years of age or older. The average household size was 2.28 and the average family size was 2.90.

In the village, the population was spread out, with 23.9% under the age of 18, 7.6% from 18 to 24, 26.4% from 25 to 44, 20.4% from 45 to 64, and 21.7% who were 65 years of age or older. The median age was 40 years. For every 100 females, there were 87.2 males. For every 100 females age 18 and over, there were 81.2 males.

The median income for a household in the village was $29,278, and the median income for a family was $39,087. Males had a median income of $30,692 versus $19,263 for females. The per capita income for the village was $15,848. About 9.7% of families and 13.8% of the population were below the poverty line, including 17.8% of those under age 18 and 11.7% of those age 65 or over.

== Climate ==
Climate data for Penn Yan Airport, New York (1991–2020 normals, extremes 1998–present)
Month	Jan	Feb	Mar	Apr	May	Jun	Jul	Aug	Sep	Oct	Nov	Dec	Year
Record high °F (°C)	66 (19)	74 (23)	81 (27)	92 (33)	93 (34)	97 (36)	101 (38)	97 (36)	94 (34)	90 (32)	79 (26)	69 (21)	101 (38)
Mean daily maximum °F (°C)	32.7 (0.4)	34.8 (1.6)	43.2 (6.2)	56.2 (13.4)	68.8 (20.4)	76.6 (24.8)	81.4 (27.4)	79.7 (26.5)	73.0 (22.8)	60.6 (15.9)	48.4 (9.1)	37.9 (3.3)	57.8 (14.3)
Daily mean °F (°C)	25.1 (−3.8)	26.6 (−3.0)	34.3 (1.3)	45.8 (7.7)	57.9 (14.4)	66.8 (19.3)	71.6 (22.0)	69.8 (21.0)	62.8 (17.1)	51.6 (10.9)	40.5 (4.7)	31.3 (−0.4)	48.7 (9.3)
Mean daily minimum °F (°C)	17.5 (−8.1)	18.5 (−7.5)	25.4 (−3.7)	35.5 (1.9)	47.0 (8.3)	57.0 (13.9)	61.8 (16.6)	59.9 (15.5)	52.6 (11.4)	42.6 (5.9)	32.7 (0.4)	24.7 (−4.1)	39.6 (4.2)
Record low °F (°C)	−18 (−28)	−12 (−24)	−3 (−19)	2 (−17)	27 (−3)	38 (3)	44 (7)	43 (6)	30 (−1)	22 (−6)	2 (−17)	−4 (−20)	−18 (−28)
Average precipitation inches (mm)	1.49 (38)	1.26 (32)	2.06 (52)	2.81 (71)	2.88 (73)	2.77 (70)	3.39 (86)	2.84 (72)	3.89 (99)	2.88 (73)	2.14 (54)	1.83 (46)	30.24 (768)
Average precipitation days (≥ 0.01 in)	10.0	9.9	11.3	12.6	13.4	13.2	11.5	13.1	12.0	14.0	10.2	9.8	141.0
Source: NOAA

== Media ==
WYLF-AM 850 "Your Lifetime Favorites" broadcasts from studios in Penn Yan. Finger Lakes Country (WFLR) also broadcasts from a Main Street studio.

The Chronicle-Express is Penn Yan's weekly newspaper that provides information regarding a variety of current events and updates of local news.

== Notable people ==
- William Babcock, former US Congressman
- David Bordwell, prominent American film theorist, film critic, and author, grew up on a farm near Penn Yan.
- Dana H. Born, Brigadier General, former Penn Yan Resident - past Dean of Faculty at the United States Air Force Academy
- Dan Beach Bradley, born July 18, 1804, studied here c. 1830 before serving as a highly regarded medical missionary to Siam, from 1835 until his death in Bangkok June 23, 1873.
- Stimson Joseph Brown, Commodore and astronomer, born in Penn Yan
- Sophia Cacciola, filmmaker, musician, and artist
- Tony Collins, NFL running back who played for the New England Patriots, grew up in Penn Yan.
- Cris Crissy, NFL Cornerback played for the Washington Redskins, born, raised and grew up in Penn Yan.
- Sylvester J. Conklin, former Wisconsin State Assemblyman, was born in Penn Yan.
- Susan Miller Dorsey, former superintendent of Los Angeles schools, was born in Penn Yan.
- Duane Eddy, Guitarist/Composer, a member of The Rock and Roll Hall of Fame graduated from High School in Penn Yan
- Samuel S. Ellsworth, former US Congressman
- Jonathan J. Hazard, Rhode Island Antifederalist and Country Party founder; moved to Penn Yan with his wife and children in 1805 and died here in 1812.
- Thomas Augustine Hendrick, American Roman Catholic bishop, was born in Penn Yan.
- Dutch Hoag, Hall of Fame auto racing driver
- John Imbrie, paleoceanographer and MacArthur Fellow, known for proving the theory of the Earth's ice ages, was born in Penn Yan.
- Maria Brace Kimball (1852–1933), educator, elocutionist, writer
- William M. Oliver, former US Congressman
- John Roche (1893–1952), actor
- Henry Parker Sartwell, physician and botanist, settled in Penn Yan about 1830 and died there in 1867.
- Walter H. Stevens, Confederate Brigadier General
- Robert Tinney, Contemporary illustrator

== See also ==
- Red Jacket
