= Dan Quinlan =

American actor, stage performer (1863–1940)

- Born: Daniel Cullinan; April 21, 1863; Elmira, New York, U.S.
- Died: July 12, 1940 (aged 77); Elmira, New York, U.S.
- Other name: Daniel J. Quinlan
- Occupations: Actor, acting coach
- Years active: 1883–1932
- Known for: Vaudeville and blackface minstrel performer, Broadway actor

Daniel J. Quinlan (born Daniel Cullinan; April 21, 1863 – July 12, 1940), known on the stage as Dan Quinlan, was an American actor and vaudeville and minstrel show performer. He had an active career on the American stage from 1883 until his retirement in 1932. He began his career in minstrel shows and then transitioned into vaudeville where he performed as one half of the duo Quinlan & Mack from 1905 to 1910. In his latter career he worked in legitimate theatre; starring in several Broadway musicals in the 1910s and 1920s.

== Life and career ==
Dan Quinlan was born with name Daniel Cullinan on April 21, 1863, in Elmira, New York. He was the son of Irish immigrants John and Margaret Cullinan. Before working as an actor he worked in the rolling factory of the Elmira Iron Rolling Mill Company.

Quinlan began his career on the stage in 1883 as a member of Barlow, Wilson and Co.'s Mammoth Minstrels. He worked for a variety of minstrel shows, including ones operated by Al G. Field and McIntyre & Heath. From 1905 to 1910 he performed with Keller Mack in the vaudeville duo Quinlan and Mack. He later worked in the legitimate theatre, notably starring is multiple musicals on Broadway. His Broadway credits include the roles of Hiram J. Kidder in Harry B. Smith and Carl Woess's Molly O' (1916, Cort Theatre), multiple roles in Harold Atteridge and Sigmund Romberg's The Show of Wonders (1916–1917, Winter Garden Theatre), Col. Winslow in Jean Schwartz and Alfred Bryan's Hello, Alexander (1919, 44th Street Theatre), and Col. Shelby Bright in Red Pepper (1922, Shubert Theatre).

Quinlan retired from the stage in 1932, and returned to his native town of Elmira where he lived for the rest of his life. He worked as an acting coach in his final years and also directed amateur stage productions. Quinlan died during surgery at a hospital in Elmira, New York, on 12 July 1940 at the age of 77. At the time of his death, his wife was the head of the drama department at Elmira College. Daniel and his wife had six daughters together.

== Bibliography ==
- Dietz, Dan (2021). The Complete Book of 1910s Broadway Musicals. Rowman & Littlefield Publishers. ISBN 9781538150283.
- Dietz, Dan (2019). The Complete Book of 1920s Broadway Musicals. Rowman & Littlefield Publishers. ISBN 9781442245280.
