= Near Westside Historic District =

Historic district in New York, United States

- U.S. National Register of Historic Places
- U.S. Historic district
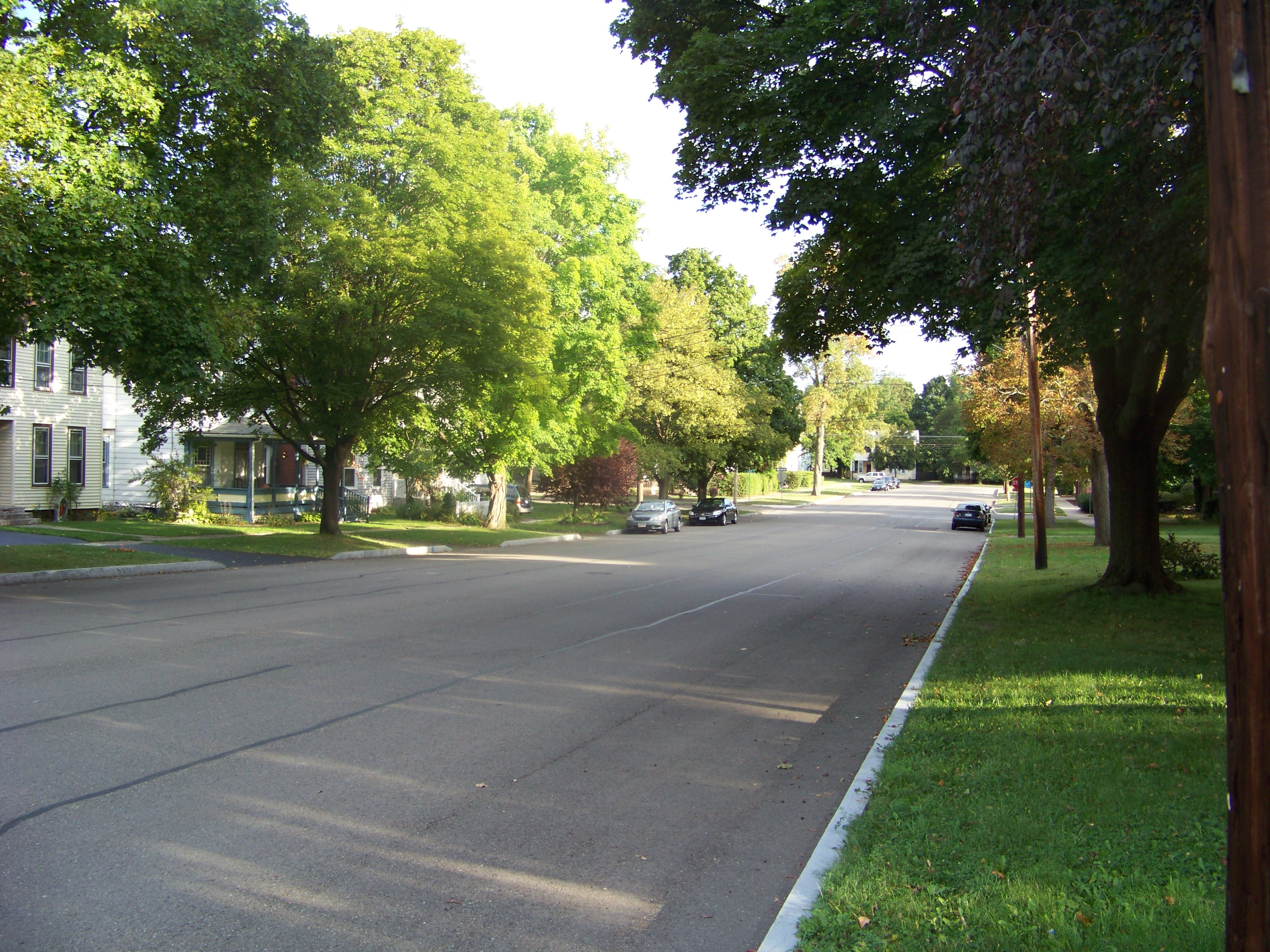

- Location within New York Location within the United States
- Location: Roughly bounded by Chemung River, College Ave., 2nd and Hoffman Sts., Elmira, New York
- Coordinates: 42°5′23″N 76°49′0″W
- Area: 77 acres (31 ha)
- Architectural style: Colonial Revival, Italianate
- NRHP reference No.: 83003906
- Added to NRHP: December 22, 1983

Near Westside Historic District is a national historic district located at Elmira in Chemung County, New York. The district includes 480 principal structures over 25-30 blocks in a 77-acre (310,000 m^{2}) district. The district is predominantly residential with only about 15 percent of the structures having commercial or mixed commercial / residential use. A full range of 19th and 20th century styles in domestic architecture is represented in the district.

It was listed on the National Register of Historic Places in 1983.

== Gallery ==
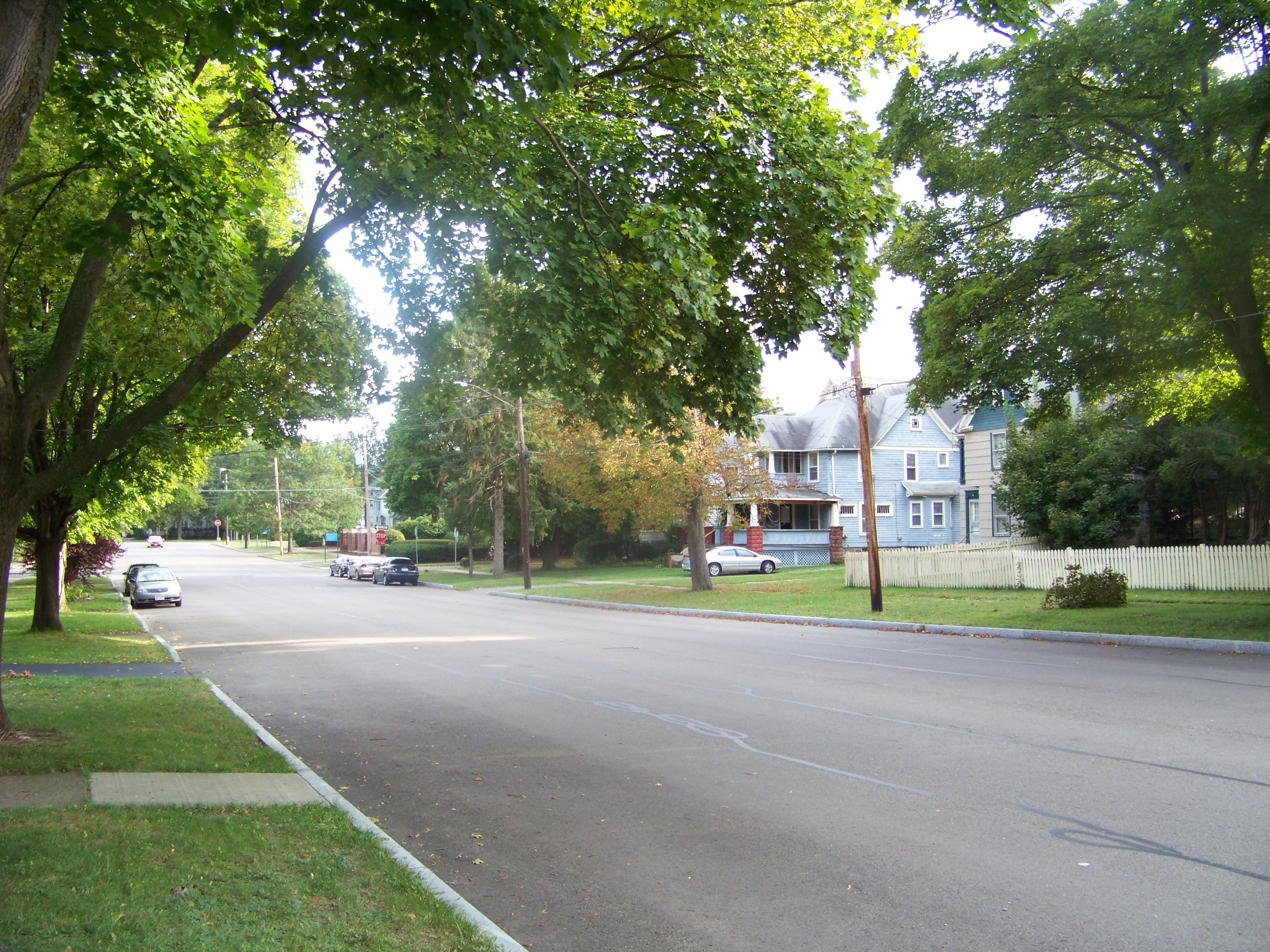
Street view

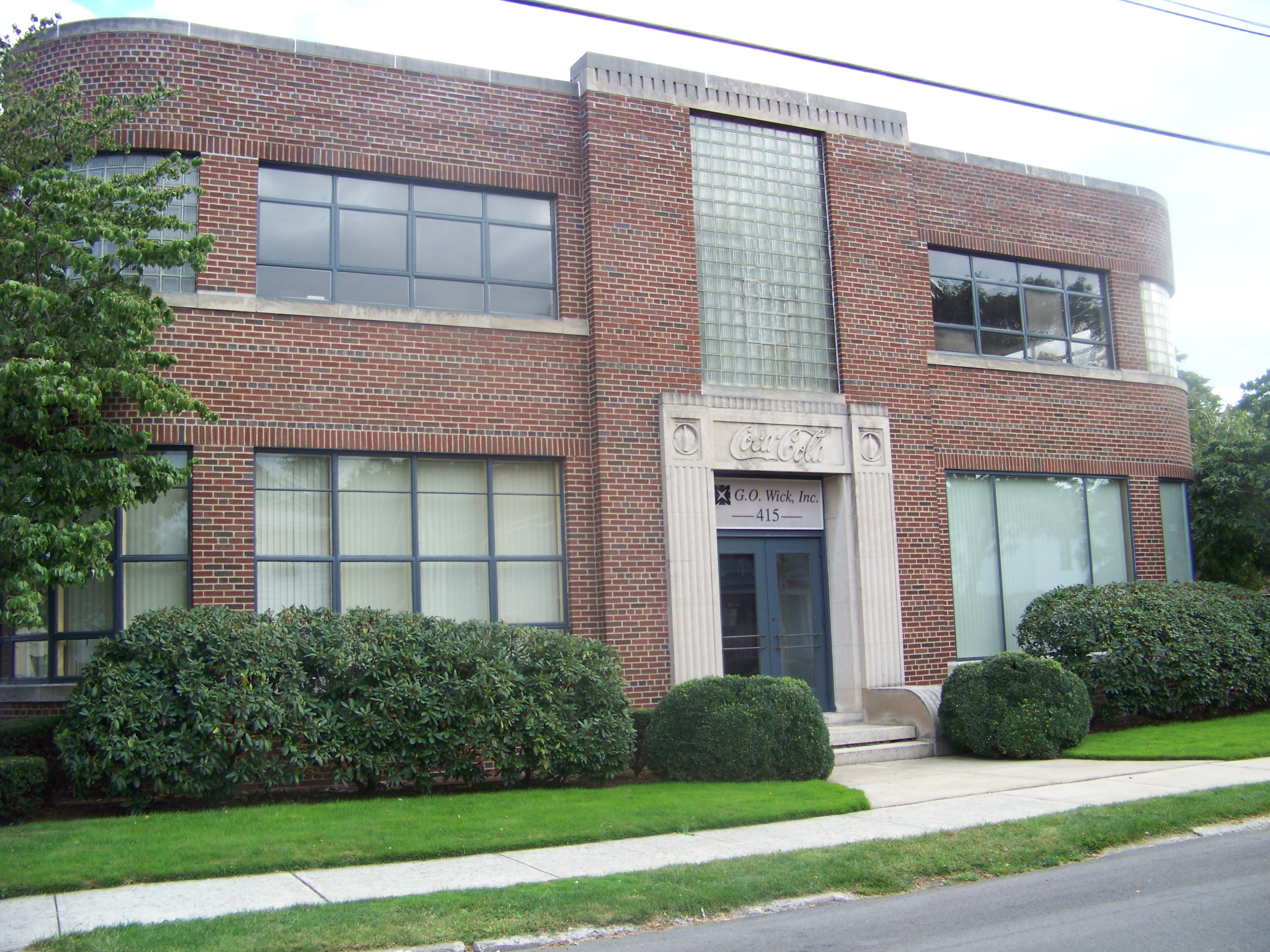
Elmira Coca-Cola Bottling Company Works
