= Emmanuel Episcopal Church (Elmira, New York) =

Historic church in New York, United States

- U.S. National Register of Historic Places
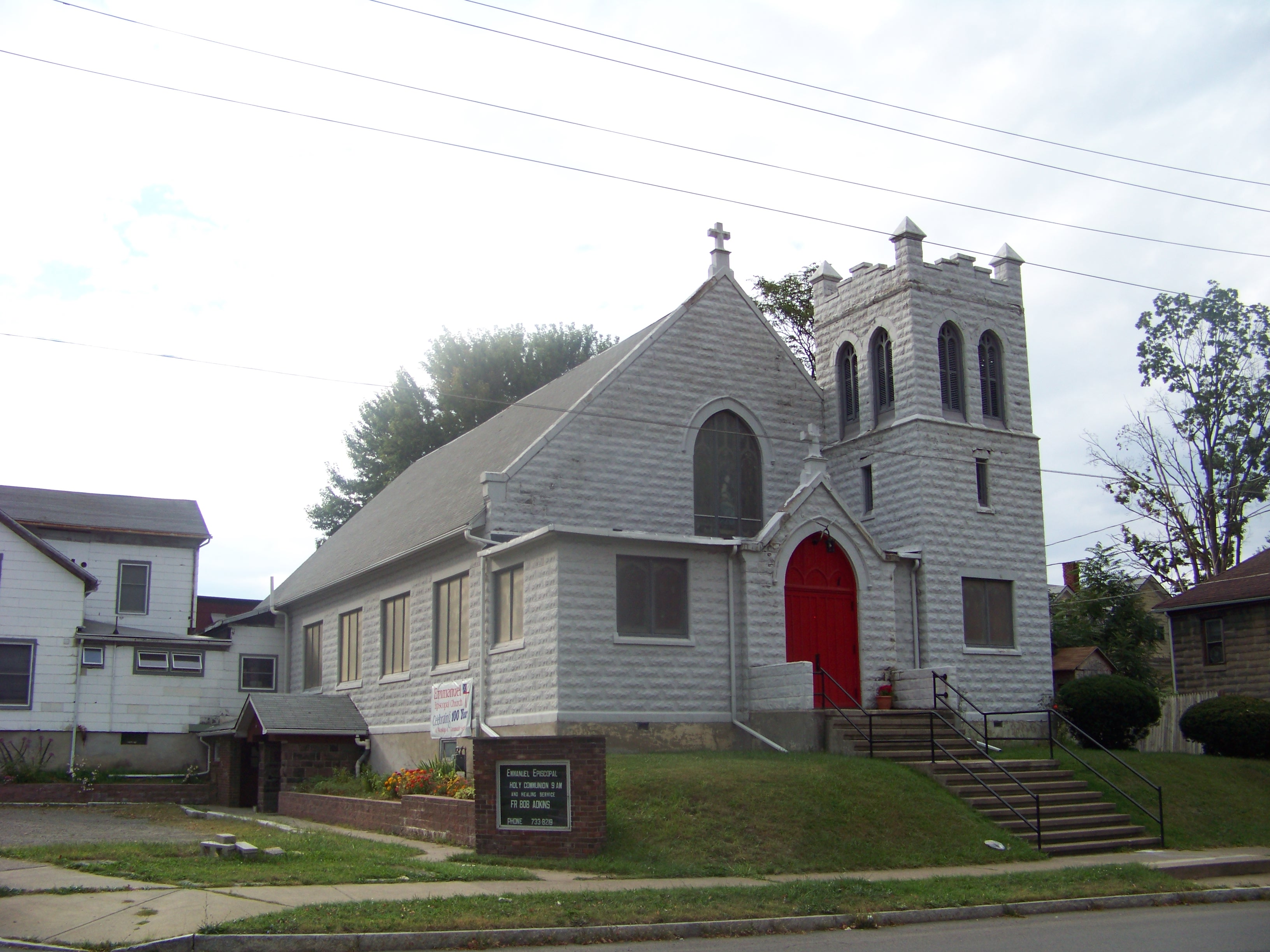

- Location within New York Location within the United States
- Location: Elmira, New York
- Coordinates: 42°4′48″N 76°48′11″W
- Architect: multiple
- Architectural style: Gothic
- NRHP reference No.: 98001395
- Added to NRHP: November 19, 1998

Emmanuel Episcopal Church is located at 380 Pennsylvania Avenue in Elmira, New York. It is significant for its High Victorian Gothic style of architecture. The surface of the cast concrete building was cast to resemble rough cut stone. This church was added to the National Register of Historic Places in November, 1998.
