= William S. Gerity House =

Historic house in New York, United States

- William S. Gerity House ("The Strawberry Mansion")
- U.S. National Register of Historic Places
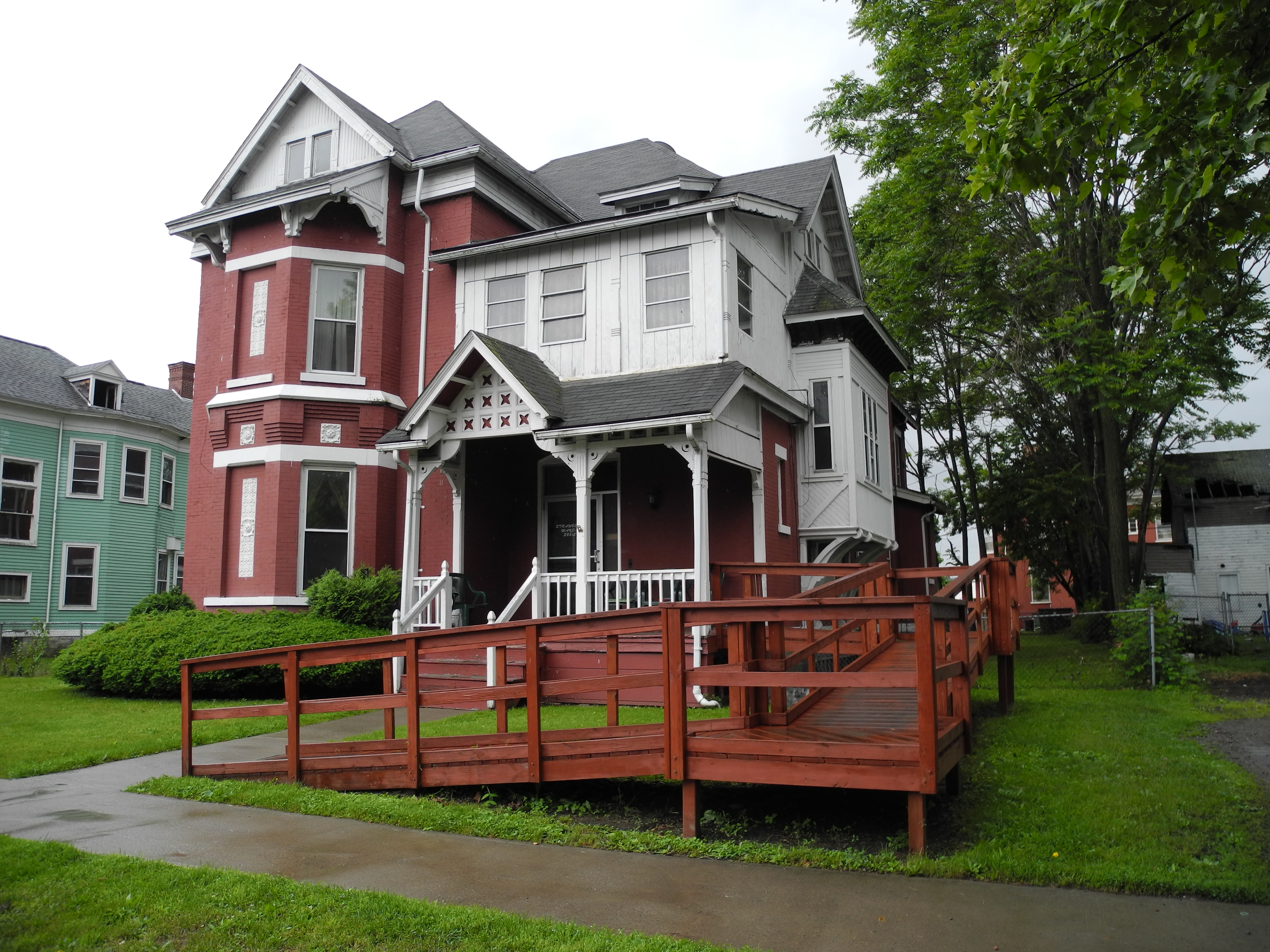

- Location within New York Location within the United States
- Location: 415 William St., Elmira, New York
- Coordinates: 42°5′38.13″N 76°48′9.69″W
- Area: 0.33 acres (0.13 ha)
- Built: 1880
- Architect: Gerity, Thomas
- Architectural style: Queen Anne
- NRHP reference No.: 10000025
- Added to NRHP: February 22, 2010

The William S. Gerity House is a historic house located at 415 William Street in Elmira, Chemung County, New York.

== Description and history ==
Known in upstate New York as "The Strawberry Mansion" (for its distinct red brick facade), this historic home was built in about 1880 and designed by Thomas Gerity, a well-known regional architect of the day. A large two-story, brick and stone Queen Anne style dwelling of almost 8,000 square feet, the home showcases classic wood moldings, 12 foot etched ceilings, and original pocket doors. It features an irregular cross-gabled massing and high gable roofs, as well as a large bracketed entrance porch, second story balcony, and projected semi-octagonal front bay.

It was listed on the National Register of Historic Places on February 22, 2010. Originally designed as a private residence, "The Strawberry Mansion" was purchased in December 2019 by Charlie Schmitt and Brenda Brown, who claimed they were restoring it to its Victorian period grandeur for use as a private residence and vacation rental. In July 2023, the home was listed for sale, the exterior covered in ivy.
