= Buildings at 104–116 West Water St. =

Historic commercial building in New York, United States

- U.S. National Register of Historic Places
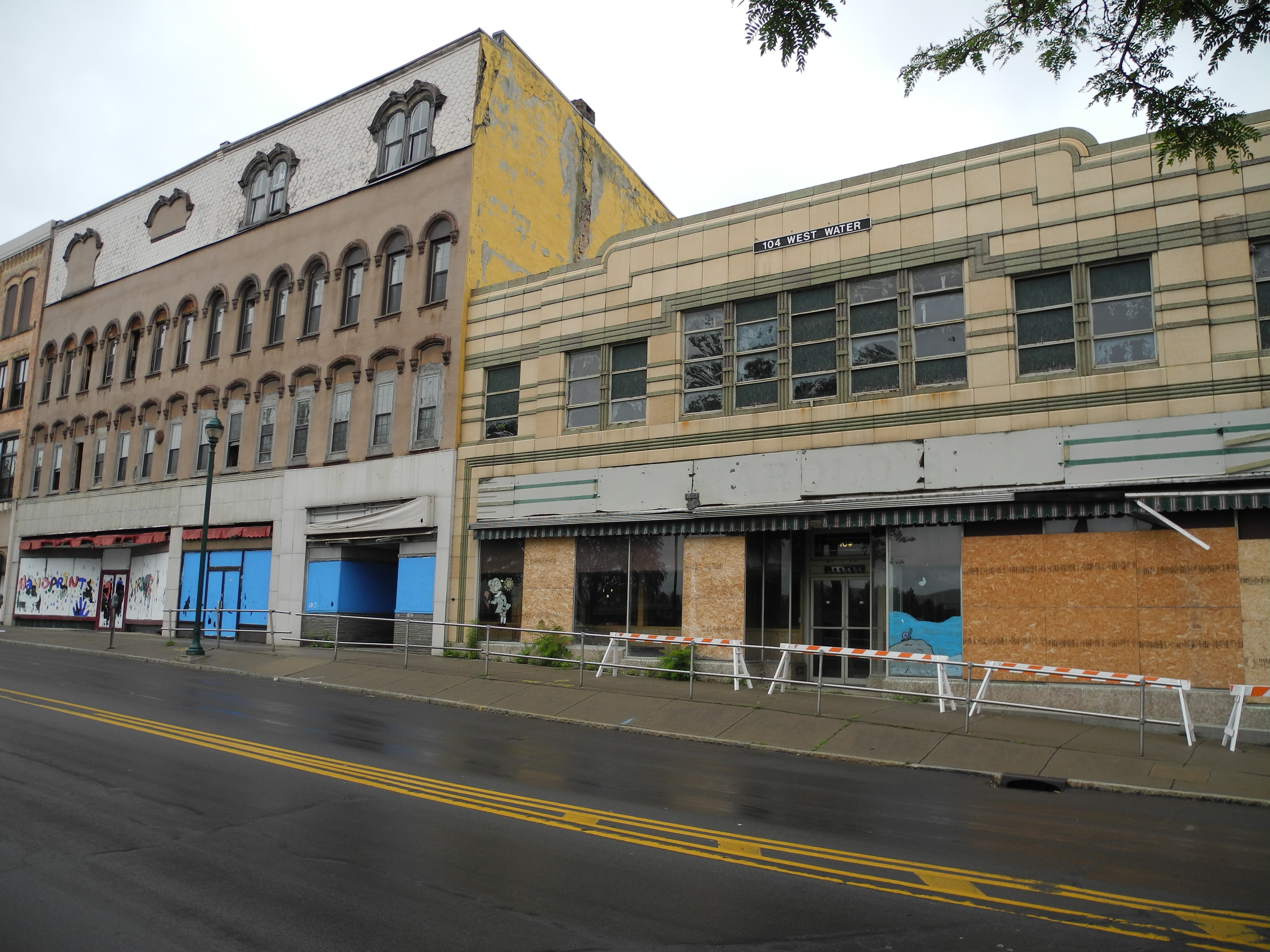

- Location within New York Location within the United States
- Location: 104–116 West Water St., Elmira, New York
- Coordinates: 42°5′16.97″N 76°48′19.18″W
- Area: 0.5 acres (0.20 ha)
- Built: 1870, 1934
- Architectural style: Second Empire, Streamline Moderne
- NRHP reference No.: 08001230
- Added to NRHP: December 17, 2008

Buildings at 104–116 West Water St. were a set of historic commercial buildings located at Elmira in Chemung County, New York. They included a 3-story, four-bay building (114–116 W. Water); a 3 1/2-story, 14-bay Second Empire style building built about 1870 (106–112 W. Water); and a 2-story, five-bay Streamline Moderne building (104 W. Water). The building at 104 W. Water was built in 1934 as an S. S. Kresge variety store.

It was listed on the National Register of Historic Places in 2008.

Two of the buildings were deemed to be safety hazards and demolished in 2014 after failed attempts to renovate them. During this demolition an adjacent building was damaged and it and the third building were subsequently demolished in 2015, opening up a half-acre parcel for potential development. In 2018 construction of the 100 West Water Street project began on the site.
