= Lewis Sayre Van Duzer =

American Navy officer

Lewis Sayre Van Duzer (1861 – March 28, 1936) was a United States Navy officer.

== Early life and education ==
Born in Elmira, New York, he graduated from the United States Naval Academy in 1880 and retired in 1914 with the rank of captain.

== Career ==
During the Spanish–American War he participated as an officer aboard the USS Iowa in the Battle of Santiago de Cuba. He later was posted to the Philippines and China, and was an instructor in ordnance at the Naval Academy. From 1910 to 1913, he was commander of the Brooklyn Navy Yard, and finally was captain of the USS Utah from 1913 until his retirement in 1914.

== Death ==
He died in Horseheads, New York.

== Medals ==
During his career, he received several medals. He was the editor of the Army and Navy Year Book in 1895 and 1896.
