= Pratt House (Elmira, New York) =

Historic house in New York, United States

- U.S. National Register of Historic Places
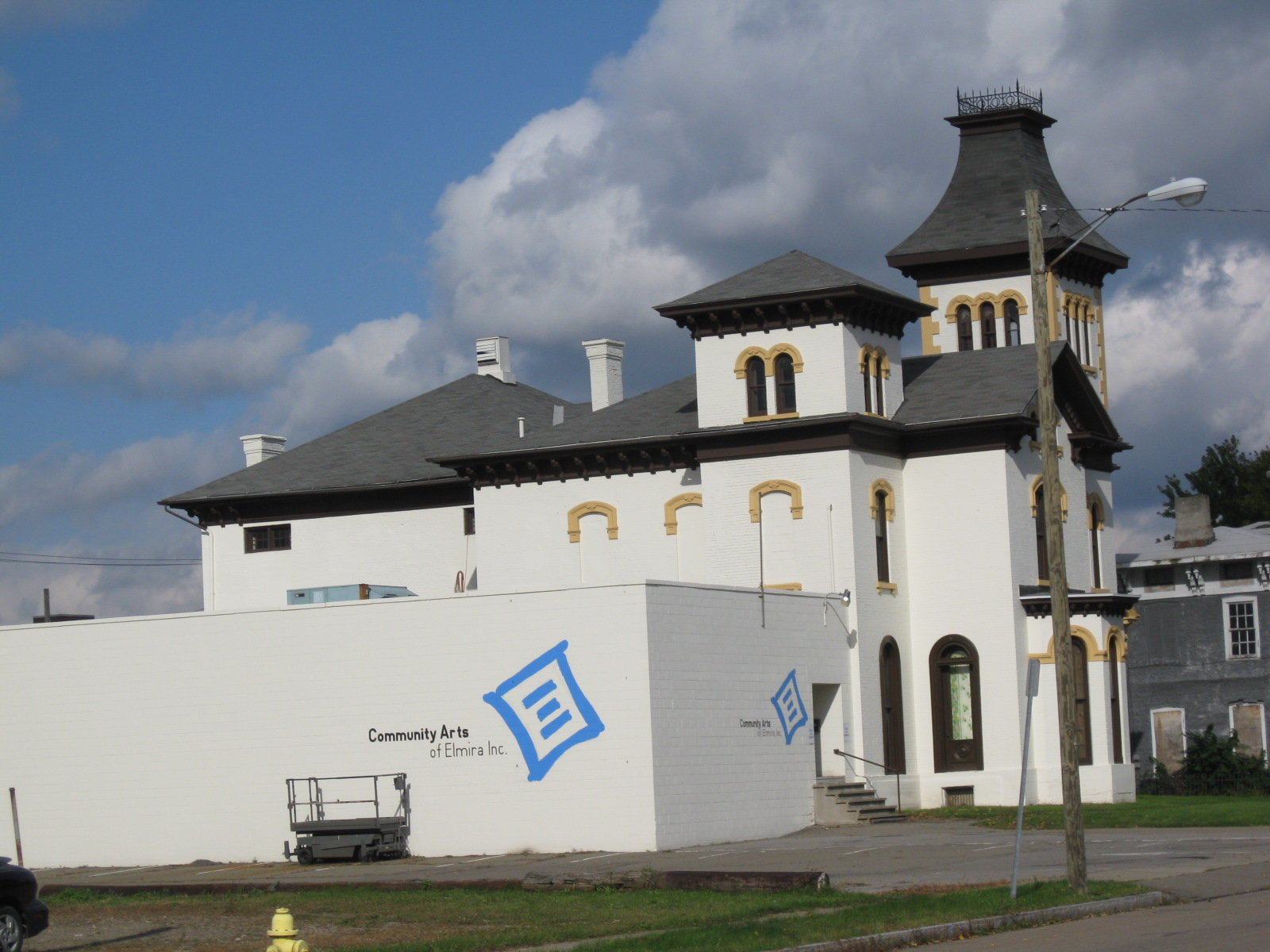
- Pratt House, October 2009

- Location within New York Location within the United States
- Location: 413 Lake St., Elmira, New York
- Coordinates: 42°5′37″N 76°48′15″W
- Area: 1.003 acres (0.406 ha)
- Built: 1872
- Architectural style: Italianate
- NRHP reference No.: 08001075
- Added to NRHP: November 21, 2008

Pratt House is a historic home located at Elmira, Chemung County, New York. It is a large scale brick dwelling in the Italianate style. It has a cross-gable plan and features two asymmetrical towers, a projecting polygonal bay, and a stepped back, Arts and Crafts style north wing. The lower tower has a pyramidal roof and the taller tower a bell cast roof embellished with cresting. It was originally located on Union Place, but moved to its present location in 1872 when it was extensively remodeled to its present appearance. The rear wing was added in the 1920s when it was home to the Elmira Eagles Aerie 941.

It was listed on the National Register of Historic Places in 2008.
