= Erste Deutsche Evangelische Kirche =

Historic church in New York, United States

- U.S. National Register of Historic Places
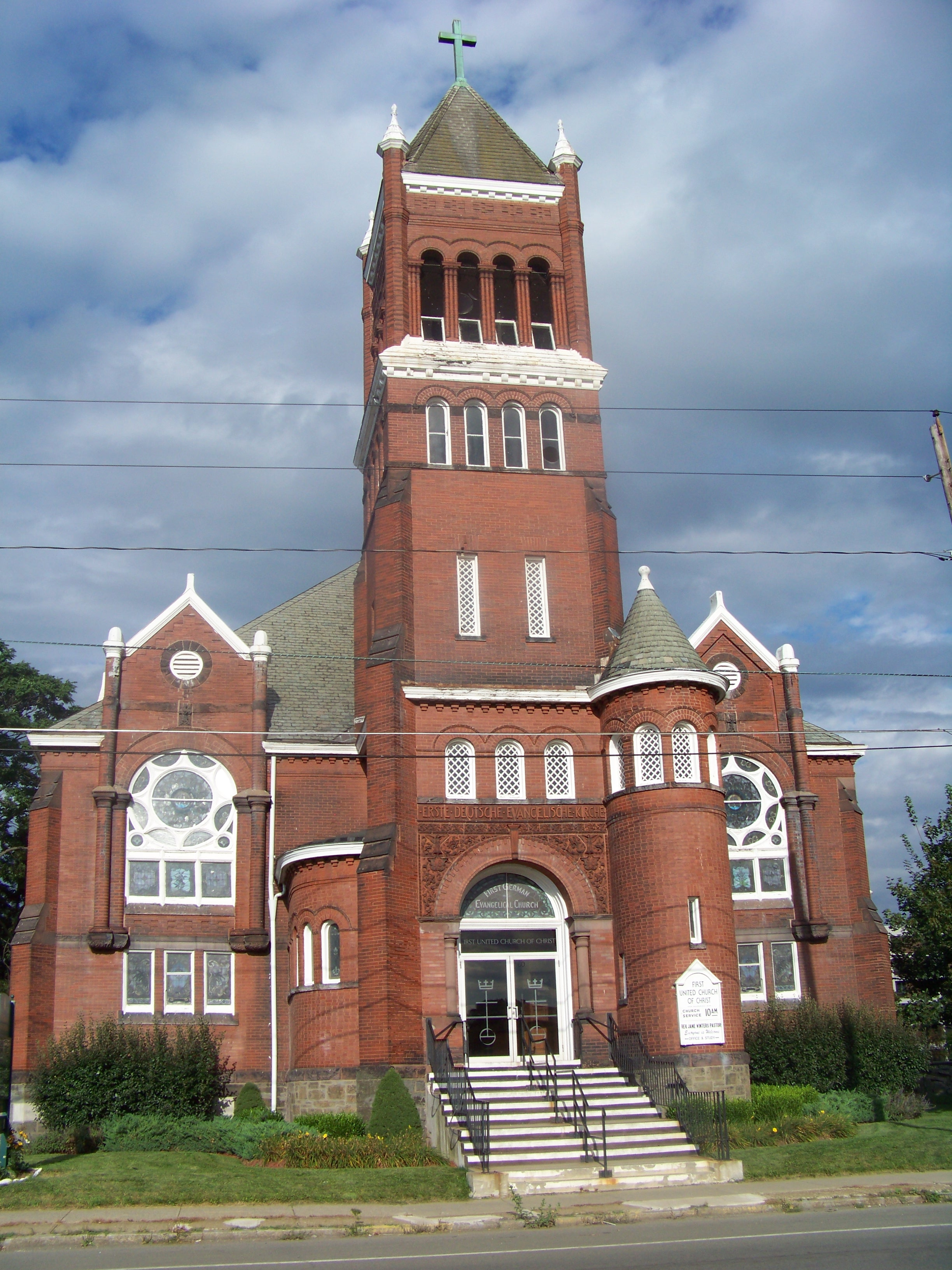

- Location within New York Location within the United States
- Location: Elmira, New York
- Coordinates: 42°5′24.45″N 76°47′54.07″W
- Built: 1898
- Architectural style: Gothic Revival
- NRHP reference No.: 07001121
- Added to NRHP: October 31, 2007

The Erste Deutsche Evangelische Kirche, also known as First United Church of Christ, is located at 160 Madison Avenue, Elmira, New York. Construction of the church started in 1898, and finished the following year. The church served the large German American population of Elmira. It is significant for its Rhenish Romanesque architecture. The church and its parsonage were listed on the National Register of Historic Places in 2007.

== Gallery ==
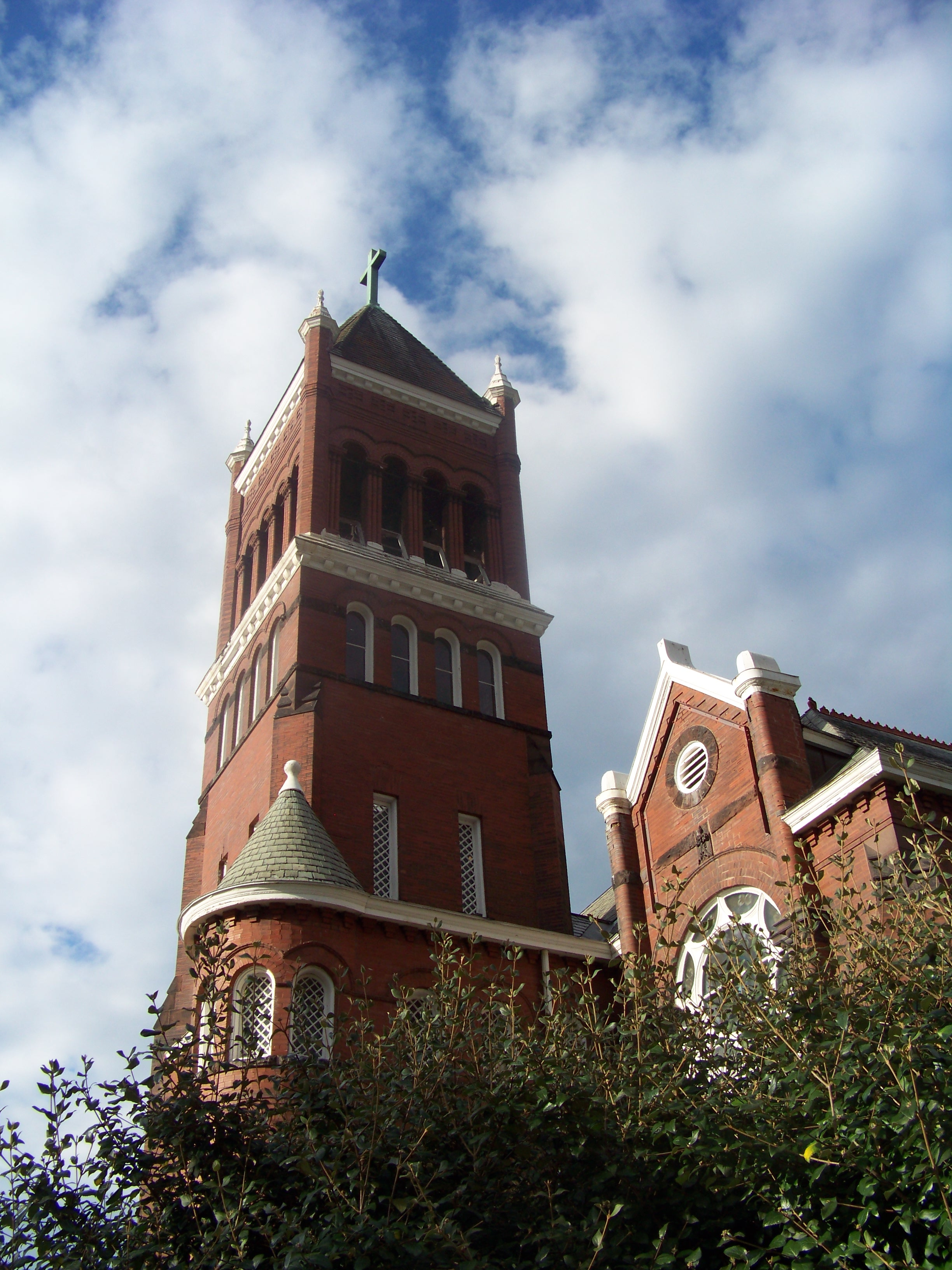
Another view of the church tower

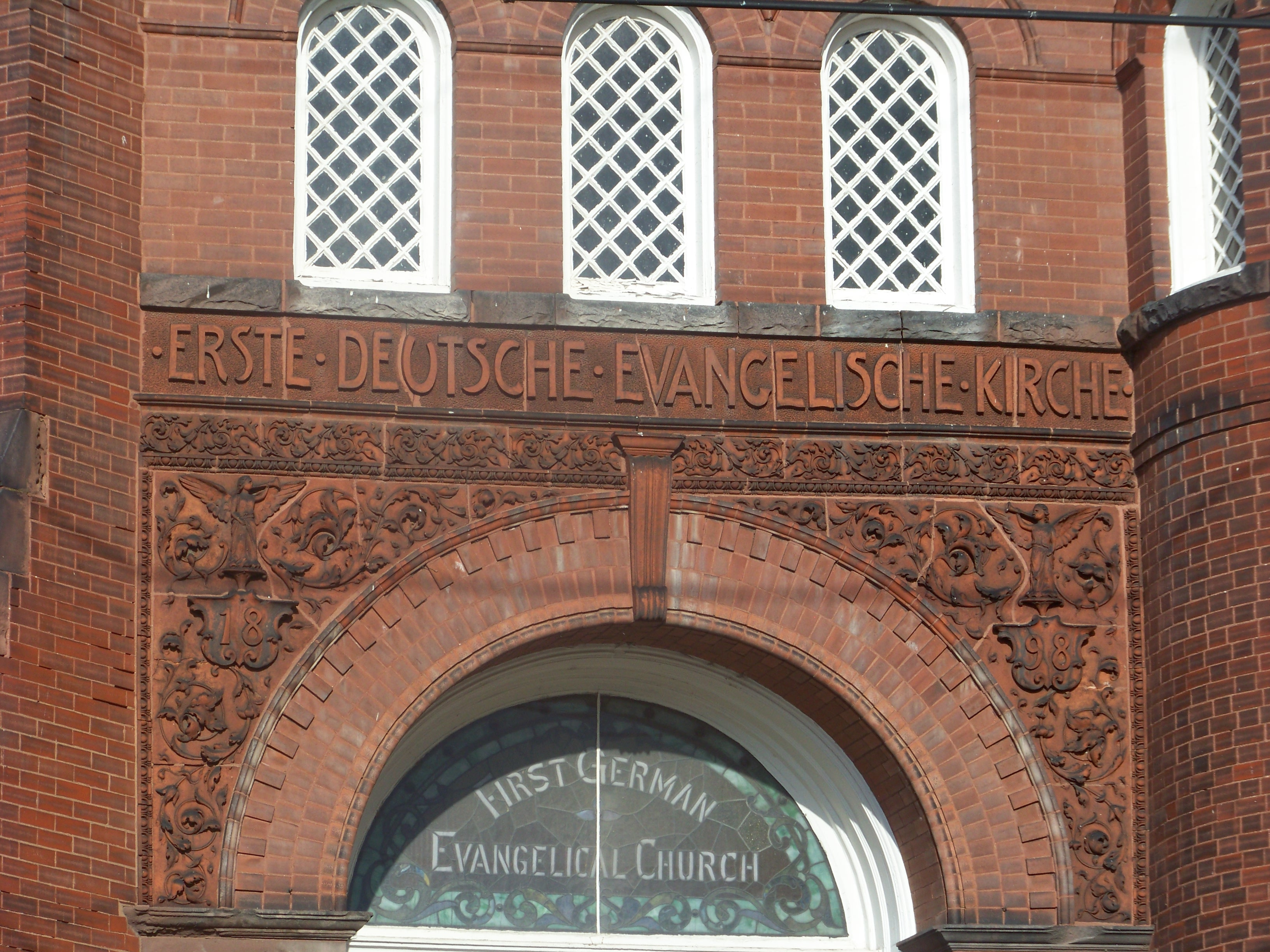
Original carved name above the door
