= Margaret L. Plunkett =

American diplomat (1906–2000)

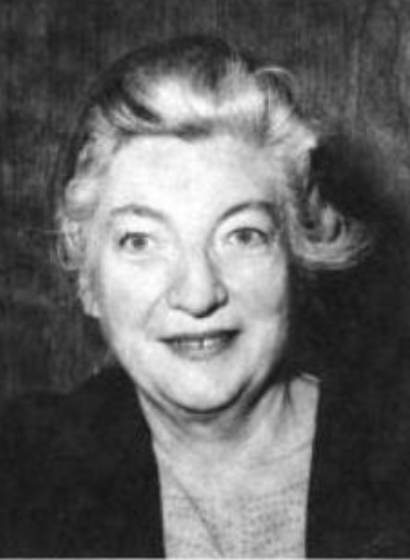
- Margaret L. Plunkett, from a 1962 publication of the US Department of State
- Born: Margaret Louise Plunkett; April 15, 1906; New York City
- Died: September 14, 2000 (aged 94); Bloomington, Minnesota
- Occupations: Diplomat, labor official

Margaret Louise Plunkett (April 15, 1906 – September 14, 2000) was an American labor economist, government official and diplomat. She was the first woman accredited to serve in the United States Labor Attaché program, with postings in the Hague (1962 to 1967) and Tel Aviv (1967 to 1972).

== Early life and education ==
Plunkett was born in Brooklyn and raised in Elmira, New York, the daughter of Robert Plunkett and Sophia Henschel Plunkett. She graduated from Corning Northside High School in 1923, attended Elmira College, and completed three degrees, including a PhD in history, at Cornell University. Her dissertation was titled "A History of the Liberty Party with Emphasis upon its Activities in the Northeastern States" (1930). During her doctoral studies she spent a year at the Brookings Institution on a fellowship. She was a member of Phi Beta Kappa.

== Career ==
Plunkett taught at Cornell University from 1930 to 1936. During World War II, she joined the United States Department of Labor to study wage rates in war industry factories. From 1945 to 1951, she headed the Labor Legislation Division of the Department's Women's Bureau, collecting data to bolster the case for equal pay legislation at the federal and state levels. In the early 1950s she was a member of the Wage Stabilization Board, and later in the 1950s she worked at the Bureau of Labor Statistics, studying blind workers and young workers. She served on Kennedy's Presidential Committee on Youth Employment before she was appointed labor attaché in 1962.

Plunkett was the first woman to be named an American labor attaché. As labor attaché, she was posted to the Hague from 1962 to 1967, and in Tel Aviv from 1967 to 1972. As a labor attaché, she "helped promote and explain U.S. labor policies, assisted U.S. citizens who were interested in labor subjects, and developed contacts with labor leaders."

Plunkett was also a serious amateur archaeologist, and during the 1950s she spent time in the Middle East pursuing this interest, at sites in Egypt, Turkey, Greece, Israel and Jordan.

Plunkett received the Meritorious Service Award from the Labor Department in 1955.

== Publications ==
- Trend of earnings among white-collar workers during the war (1944)
- "Earnings on Tugboats and Barges in New York Harbor, January 1945" (1945)
- "Equal Pay for Women Workers" (1946)
- "Personnel in Work for the Blind" (1957)
- "Personnel and Agencies Serving Blind People, 1955" (1957)
- "National Survey of Personnel Standards and Personnel Practices in Services for the Blind, 1955" (1957)
- "The Histadrut: The General Federation of Jewish Labor in Israel" (1958)
- School and early employment experience of youth; a report on seven communities, 1952–57 (1960, with Naomi Riches)
- Looking Ahead to Earning a Living (1961)
- "The Older Worker in the Job Market" (1962)
- Israel (1979, with Les Finnegan)

== Personal life ==
Plunkett died in Bloomington, Minnesota in 2000, aged 94 years.
