= Elmira, New York =

City in New York, United States

Elmira
- City
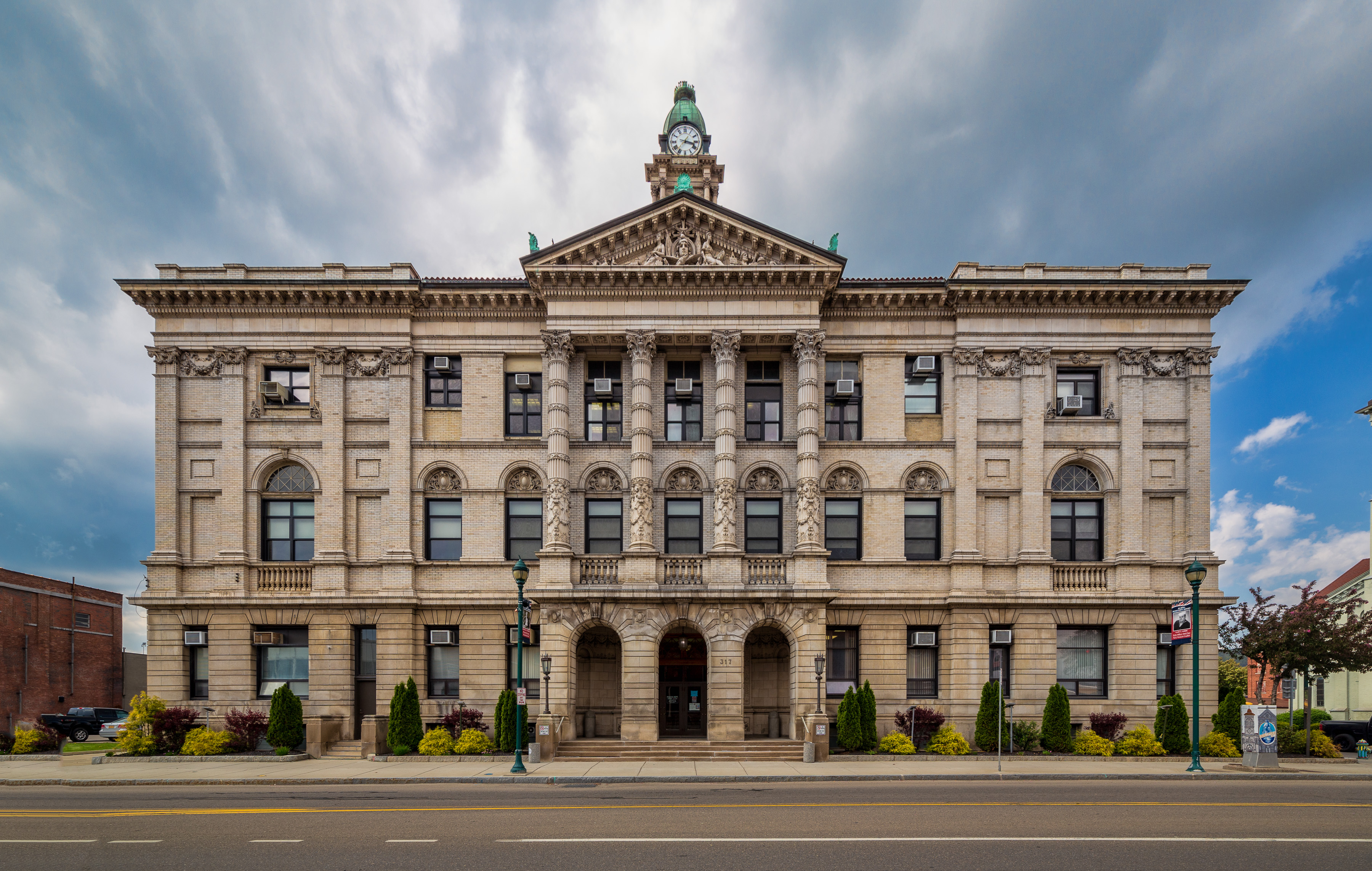
- Elmira city hall

- Flag Seal

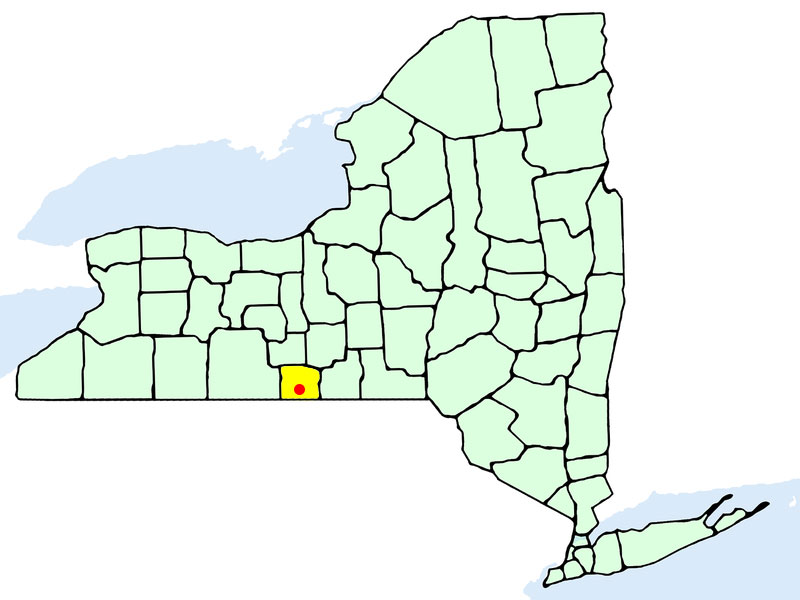
- Location in Chemung County in the state of New York
- Coordinates: 42°05′38″N 76°48′35″W
- Country: United States
- State: New York
- County: Chemung
- Incorporated: 1864; 162 years ago
- Named for: Elmira Teall

Government
  - Mayor: Daniel J. Mandell, Jr. (R)

Area
  - City: 7.58 sq mi (19.63 km^{2})
  - Land: 7.25 sq mi (18.78 km^{2})
  - Water: 0.33 sq mi (0.85 km^{2})
- Elevation: 860 ft (260 m)

Population (2020)
  - City: 26,523
  - Density: 3,657.3/sq mi (1,412.09/km^{2})
  - Metro: 84,148 (Chemung County)
- Time zone: UTC−5 (EST)
  - Summer (DST): UTC−4 (EDT)
- ZIP Codes: 14901, 14904, 14905
- Area code: 607
- FIPS code: 36-015-24229
- Website: cityofelmirany.gov

Elmira (/ɛlˈmaɪrə/) is a city in and the county seat of Chemung County, New York, United States. It is the principal city of the Elmira, New York, metropolitan statistical area, which encompasses Chemung County. The population was 26,523 at the 2020 census, down from 29,200 at the 2010 census, a decline of more than 7 percent.

The City of Elmira is in the south-central part of the county, surrounded on three sides by the Town of Elmira. It is in the Southern Tier of New York, a short distance north of the Pennsylvania state line.

The city was the site of the Elmira Prison, a prisoner-of-war camp that held over 12,000 captured Confederate soldiers during the American Civil War. Elmira College is located within the city.

== History ==
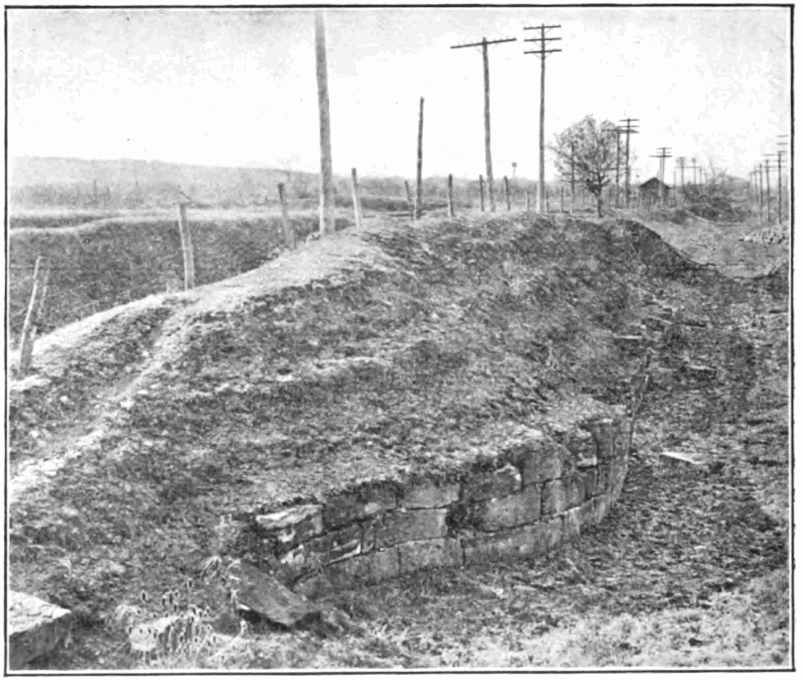
1909 Extension of Chemung Canal

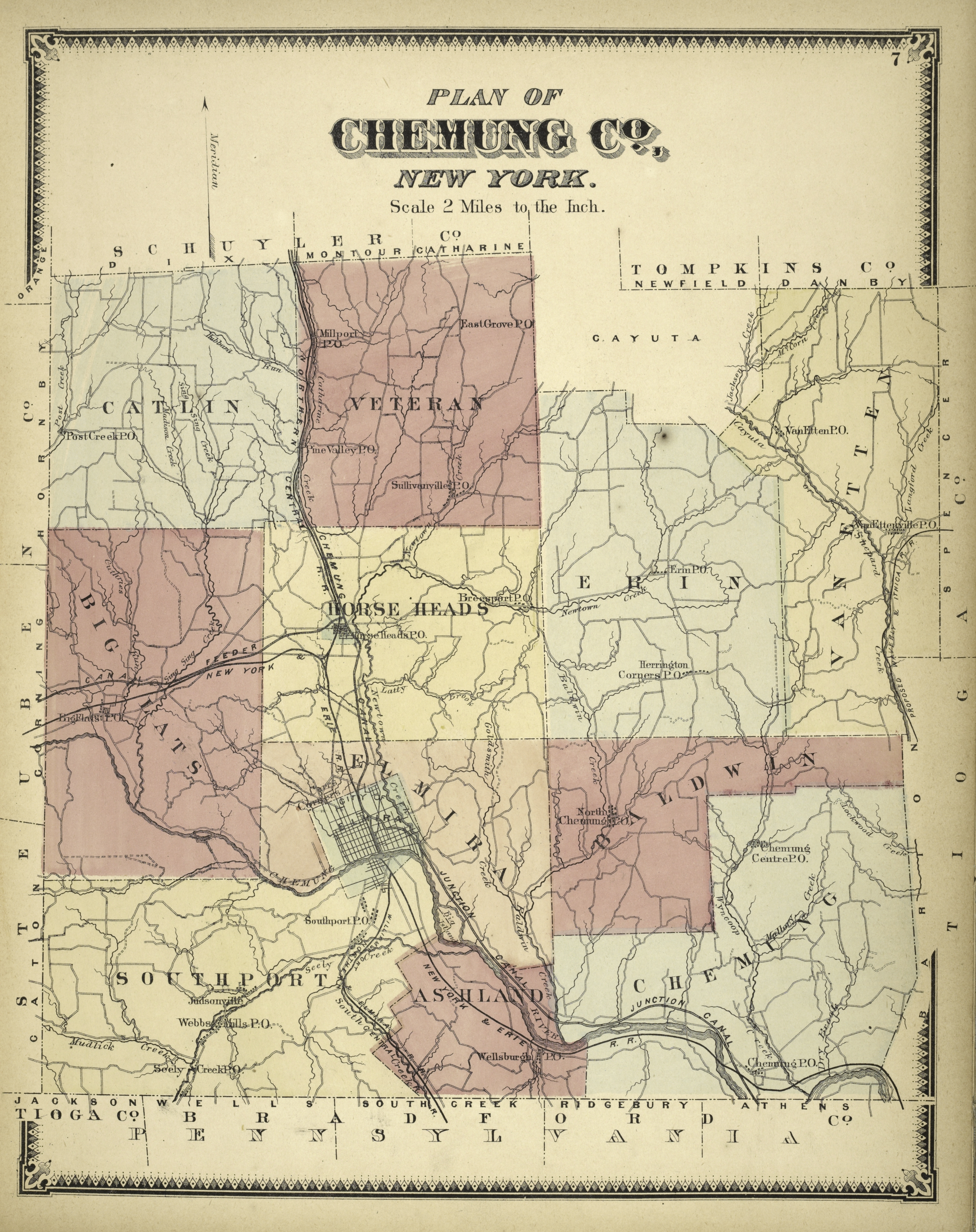
1869 map showing Elmira's location as a transportation hub in Chemung County

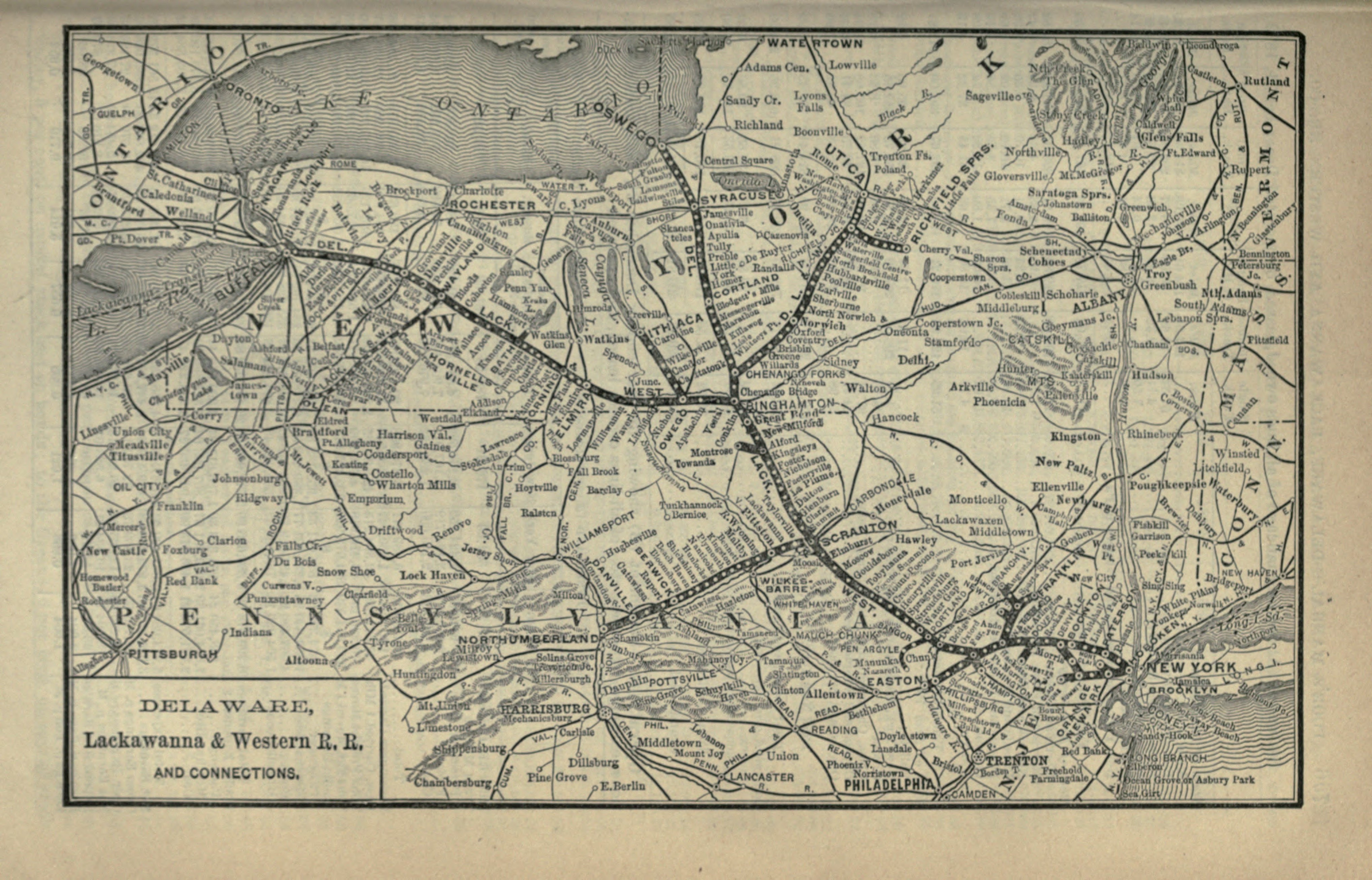
Map of Delaware, Lackawanna and Westerny Railroad in New York State and Pennsylvania, 1893

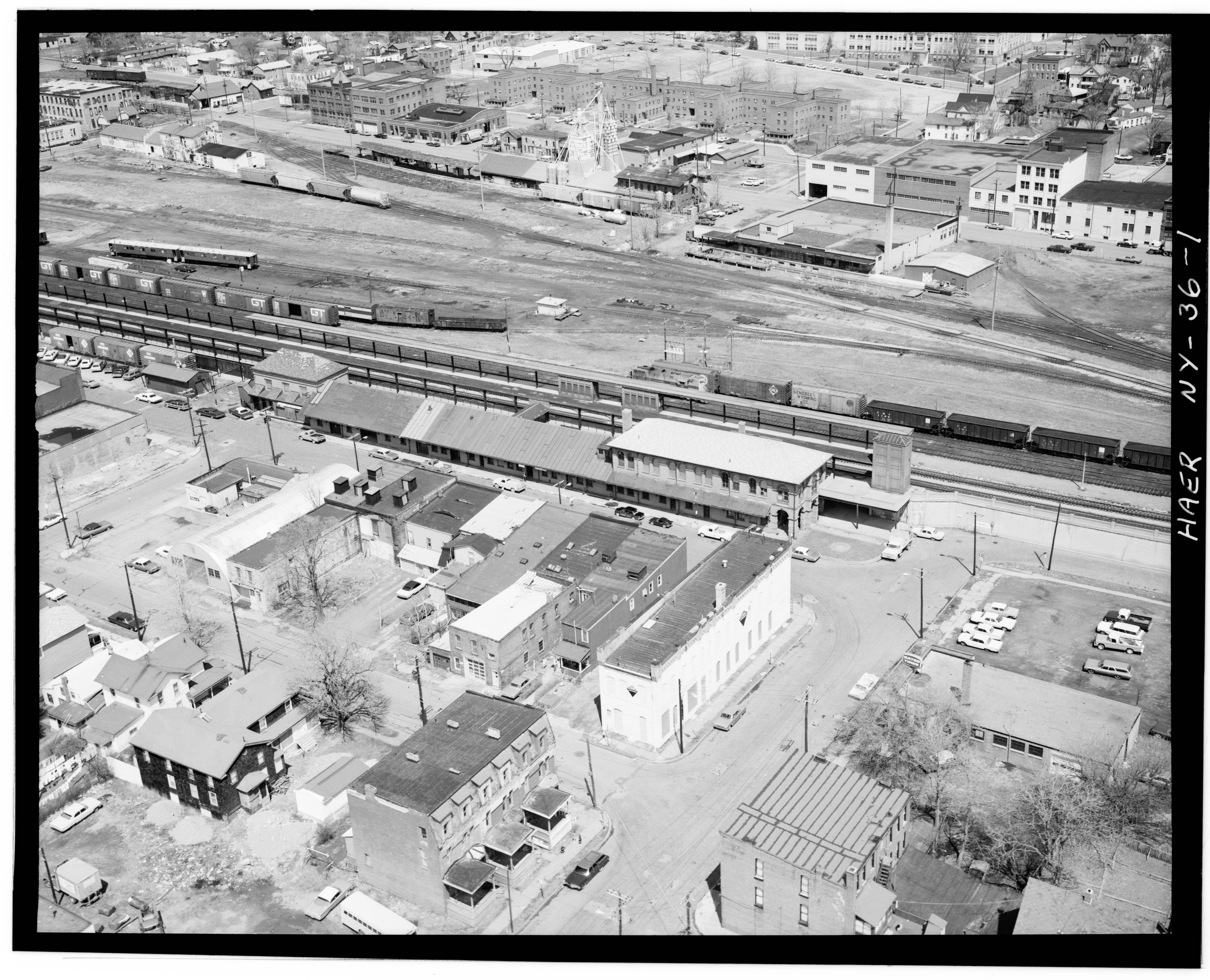
Erie Railway, Elmira Station

=== Early history ===
The region of Elmira was inhabited by the Cayuga nation (also known as the Gayogo̱hó꞉nǫʼ) of the Haudenosaunee prior to European colonization. Cayuga residing in the region maintained relations with European settlers, primarily related to the fur trade, but were otherwise relatively isolated from expanding colonial settlements.

During the American Revolutionary War, the Sullivan Expedition of 1779 was mounted by the Continental Army against the four Haudenosaunee nations which had allied with the British. The expeditionary force fought a combined British-Haudenosaunee force at the Battle of Newtown, south of the current city, in which the Continental Army was victorious. After the conclusion of the war, the Haudenosaunee and the United States signed a treaty at Elmira in 1791 to settle territorial disputes in the region. Most of the Cayuga emigrated under pressure from encroaching American settlements with the other nations of the Haudenosaunee to Canada, where they resettled on land provided by the British Crown.

The first European-American settler in Elmira was Abraham Miller, who served as a captain in the Continental Army. Miller constructed a cabin after resigning just before the end of the Revolutionary War. Miller's Pond and Miller Street are named after him and are near the location of his house.

=== Elmira's formation ===
The New York legislature established the Township of Chemung, now Chemung County, in 1788. The settlement of Newtown was soon established at the intersection of Newtown Creek and the Chemung River. In 1792, the settlement at Newtown joined with the Wisnerburg and DeWittsburg settlements to form the village of Newtown. In 1808, the village officially changed its name to the Town of Elmira, at a town meeting held at Teall's Tavern. It is said the town was named after tavern owner Nathan Teall's young daughter, but that story has never been confirmed. According to Amos Bugbee Carpenter's "Carpenter Memorial" family history book printed in 1898, Elmira is named after Major General Matthew Carpenter's daughter. This naming occurred, according to this book, in 1821 at the constitutional convention to which Matthew was a delegate. In any case, the City of Elmira, nicknamed "The Queen City," was incorporated in 1864 from part of the town of Elmira and the village of Elmira. The remaining part of the town of Elmira exists still, surrounding the city on the west, north and east. The city and town share an intricately entwined history.

It appears that Amos Carpenter in his 1898 book was referencing an 1879 book.

White Man's Legend.

In the early days, when new settlements had to be named, the white man, in imitation of his aboriginal forerunner, gave a name to his settlement that was associated either with tradition, or, as in this case, with his ideal of loveliness. According to Hon. Hiram Gray, Matthew Carpenter, then a member or the legislature and a man of influence, having seen this beautiful valley, resolved that Newtown should be the principal city, and that it should bear the name of a lady friend for whom he entertained a high opinion, and accordingly, in 18[0]8, the name was changed to Elmira.

Elmira served as a transportation hub for New York's Southern Tier in the 1800s, connecting commercial centers in Rochester and Buffalo with Albany and New York City, via the canal system and railroads. The city was the southern terminus of the Chemung Canal completed in 1833; later, the Junction Canal was constructed to connect Elmira with Corning, facilitating transport of coal from the Pennsylvania mines via the Northern branch of the Susquehanna Canal system. In 1849, the New York and Erie Railroad was built through Elmira, giving the area a New York City to Buffalo route. In 1850, the Elmira and Jefferson Railroad gave the area a route north and, in 1854, the Elmira and Williamsport Railroad a route south. These railroads and their connections made the city a prime location for an Army training and muster point early in the Civil War.

In 1872 construction began on the Utica, Ithaca and Elmira Railroad, eventually creating a route to Cortland and Syracuse via Horseheads, Breesport and Van Etten. The Delaware, Lackawanna and Western Railroad, completed in 1884, competed with the Erie's New York City to Buffalo line.

=== Prisoner-of-war camp ===
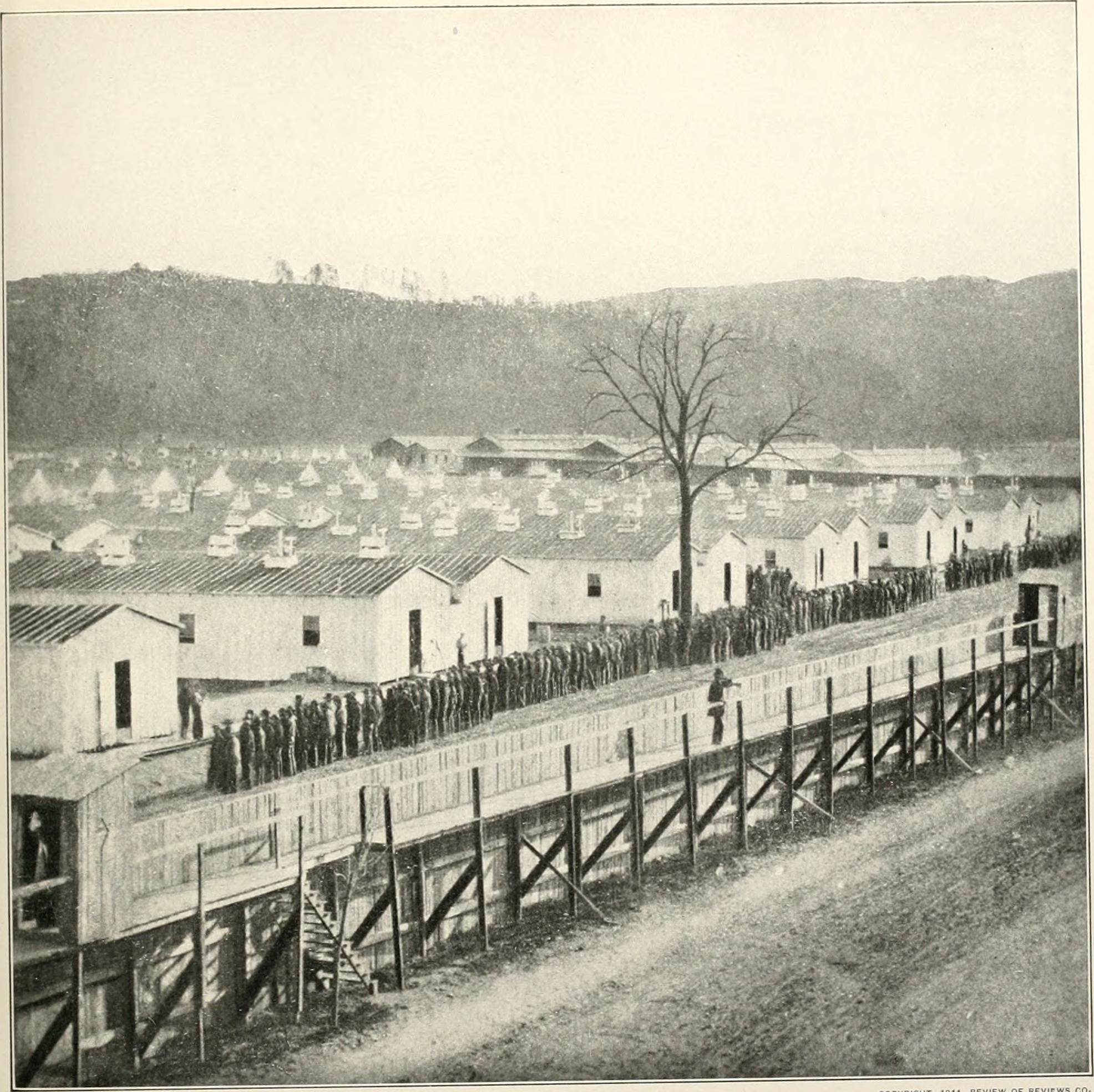
Evening roll-call at Camp Rathburn, circa 1864

A great deal of the 30-acre (120,000 m^{2}) Union installation, known as Camp Rathbun, fell into disuse as the Civil War progressed, and the camp's "Barracks #3" were converted into a Civil War prisoner of war camp in the summer of 1864. The camp, in use from June 6, 1864, until autumn 1865, was dubbed "Hellmira" by its inmates. Towner's history of 1892 and maps from the period indicate the camp occupied a somewhat irregular parallelogram, running about 1,000 feet (300 m) west and approximately the same distance south of a location several hundred feet west of Hoffman Street (Foster Avenue) and Winsor Avenue, bordered on the south by Foster's Pond, on the north bank of the Chemung River.

In the months the site was used as a camp, 12,123 Confederate soldiers were incarcerated; of these, 2,963 died during their stay from a combination of malnutrition, prolonged exposure to brutal winter weather and disease directly attributable to the dismal sanitary conditions on Foster's Pond and lack of medical care. The camp's dead were prepared for burial and laid to rest by the sexton at Woodlawn National Cemetery, ex-slave John W. Jones. At the end of the war, each prisoner was given a loyalty oath and given a train ticket back home; the last prisoner left the camp on September 27, 1865. The camp was closed, demolished and converted to farmland. Woodlawn Cemetery, about 2 miles (3 km) north of the original prison camp site (bounded by West Hill, Bancroft, Davis and Mary Streets), was designated a "National Cemetery" in 1877. The prison camp site is today a residential area.

=== Reformatory and correctional facility ===
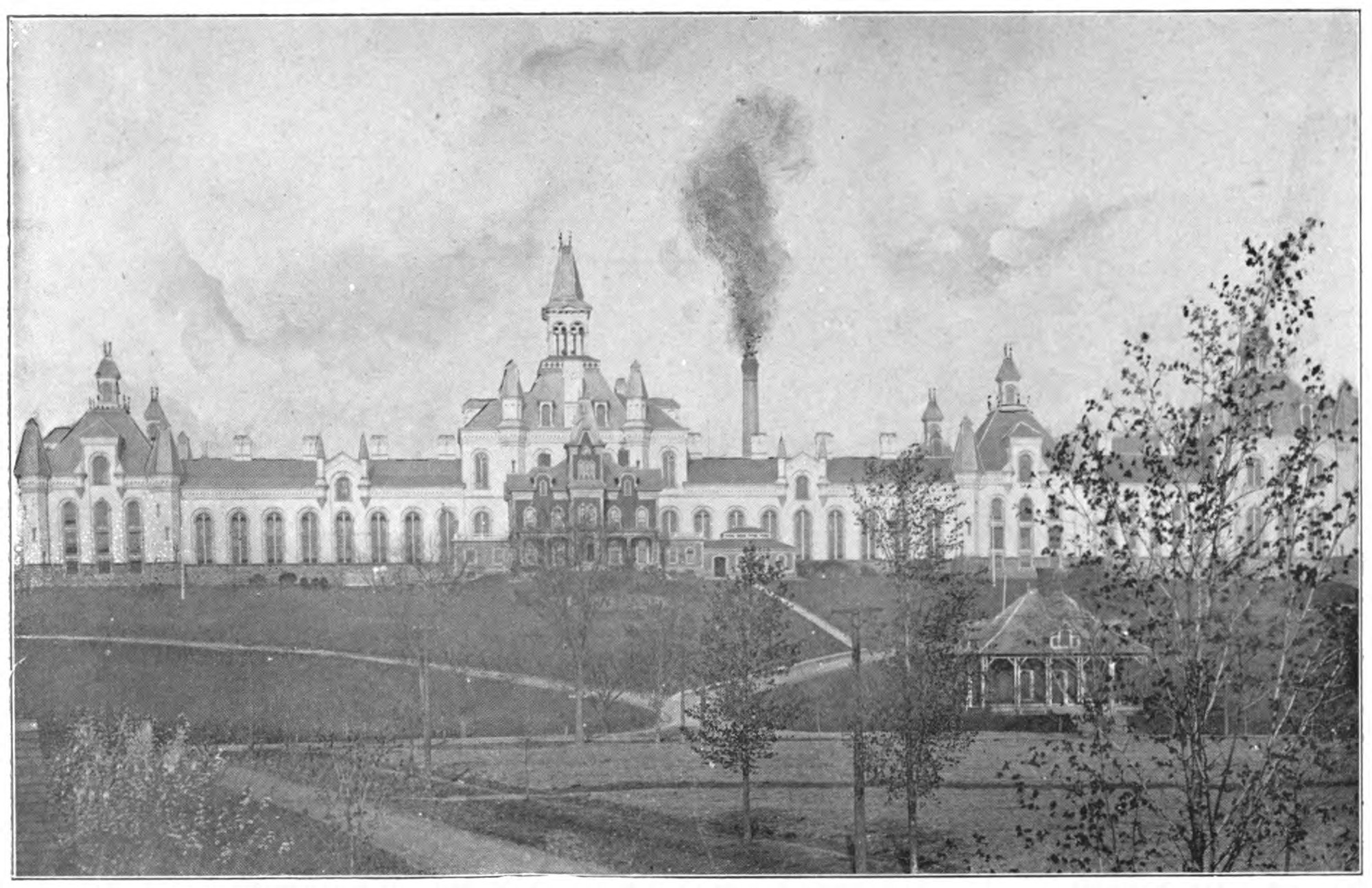
Elmira Reformatory, circa 1897

The state legislature authorized the building of a state prison for first offenders in 1866. It opened in 1876 as the Elmira Reformatory, under the direction of Zebulon Brockway, serving offenders aged sixteen to thirty. It was the first institution of its kind, and a model for others to follow. In 1970 the complex was renamed the Elmira Correctional and Reception Center.

=== Hurricane Agnes and the 1972 flood ===
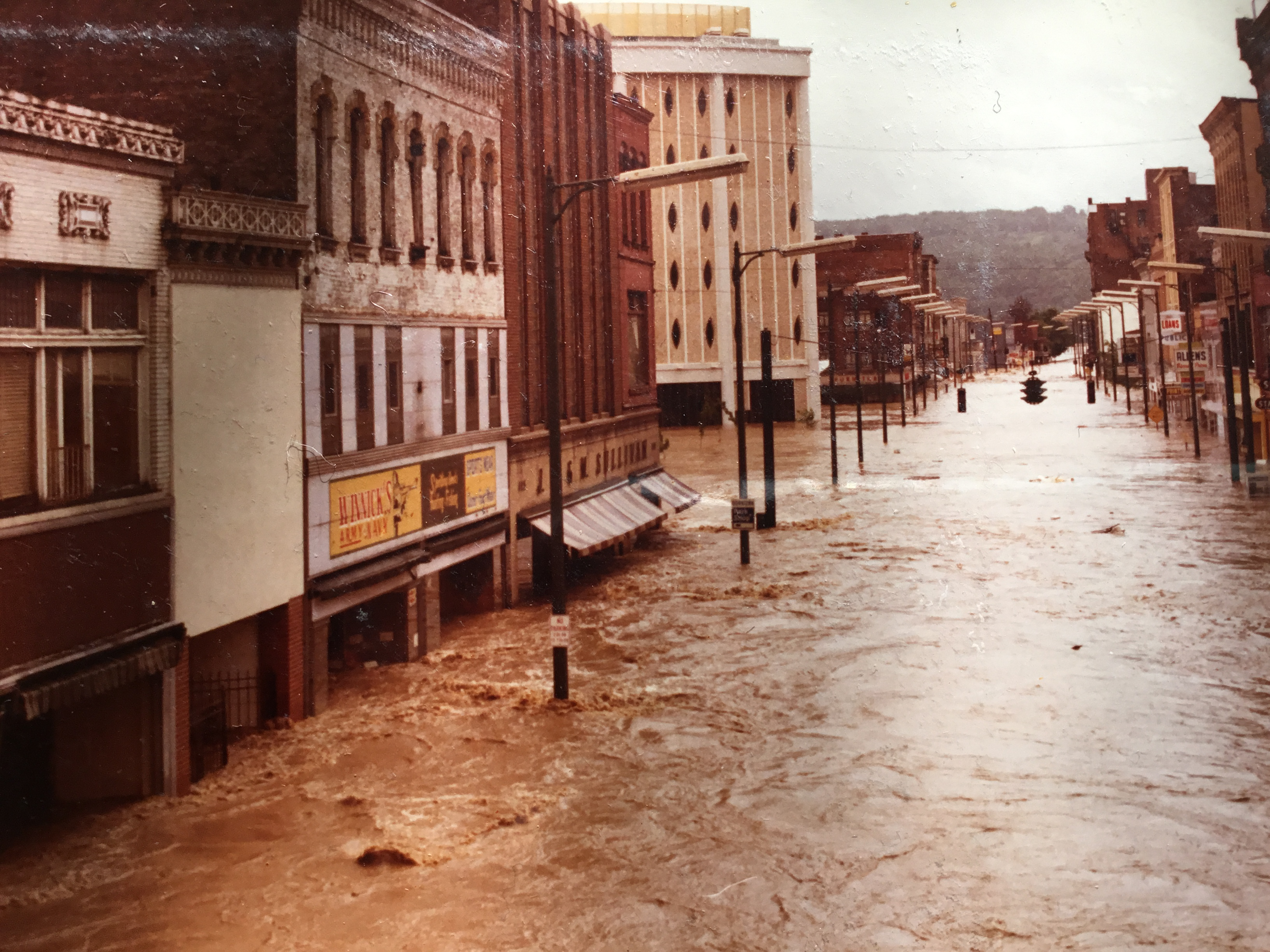
View from Erie Lackawanna train tracks, looking down Water Street during the flood of 1972. The Chemung Canal bank building can be seen in the background.

During the summer of 1972, Hurricane Agnes struck the eastern seaboard of the United States, causing significant damage stretching from Florida into New England. Elmira was particularly hit hard by the flood, with over an estimated $291 million in damage. Over 15,000 people had to flee the city, and approximately 5,000 homes were damaged or destroyed. Coordinated efforts between local churches and regional businesses helped with the cleanup. Operating in secrecy, Rochester, NY-based Eastman Kodak sent crews as part of Operation Rebuild. Their efforts rebuilt 78 homes and assisted in the repairs of countless others.

Elmira city leaders approached the New York State Urban Development Corporation (UDC) to lead the redevelopment of the city post-flood. With a select group of businessmen and city officials attempting to minimize public input, the UDC implemented the "New Elmira Plan". This entailed the removal of buildings along the river to create Riverside Park, and razing other buildings in the business district for two parking garages. Altogether, forty percent of Elmira's commercial space was eliminated as part of the plan. Local citizens lamented the loss of character and vibrancy of downtown Elmira.

=== "Storm of the Century" – 1993 snow blizzard ===
In March 1993, the city of Elmira was hit hard by a snow blizzard, nicknamed "Storm of the Century", that added 21.5 inches of snow to Elmira in a single day.

=== 2012 tornado ===
On July 26, 2012, an EF1 tornado touched down near Cottage Drive off of Route 352 and traveled through Golden Glow and the rest of the city. Moderate damage was seen after the storm passed and hundreds of trees and power lines were blown down. No one was injured. The tornado was 0.5 miles (0.80 km) wide and took the city by surprise as this area has not been prone to tornadic activity.

== Geography ==
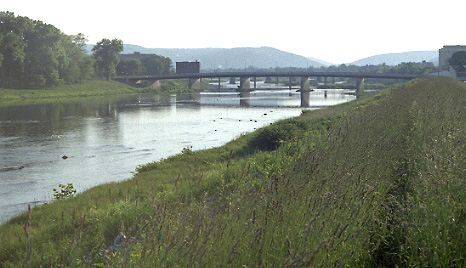
Chemung River at Elmira

According to the United States Census Bureau, the city has an area of 7.6 sq mi (19.6 km^{2}), of which 7.3 sq mi (19.0 km^{2}) is land and 0.27 sq mi (0.7 km^{2}) (3.56%) is water.

The Chemung River flows eastward through the city. Elmira is built almost entirely in the flood plain of the Chemung River and has suffered many floods, the worst from Hurricane Agnes in 1972. Newtown Creek, flowing from the north, joins the Chemung River at the city's southeast corner.

Interstate 86/New York State Route 17, The Southern Tier Expressway, connects with the city at Exit 56. New York State Route 14 passes through Elmira between Watkins Glen and Pennsylvania. New York State Route 13 begins near Lake Ontario and travels through Cortland and Ithaca before ending in Elmira. New York State Route 352 begins in Elmira at Exit 56 of the Southern Tier Expressway and continues West into Corning.

=== Climate ===
Climate data for Elmira, New York (1991–2020 normals, extremes 1894–present)
Month	Jan	Feb	Mar	Apr	May	Jun	Jul	Aug	Sep	Oct	Nov	Dec	Year
Record high °F (°C)	72 (22)	70 (21)	86 (30)	93 (34)	96 (36)	102 (39)	104 (40)	102 (39)	107 (42)	93 (34)	87 (31)	69 (21)	107 (42)
Mean maximum °F (°C)	56 (13)	56 (13)	67 (19)	81 (27)	88 (31)	92 (33)	93 (34)	92 (33)	89 (32)	79 (26)	68 (20)	57 (14)	95 (35)
Mean daily maximum °F (°C)	33.7 (0.9)	36.3 (2.4)	44.8 (7.1)	58.5 (14.7)	71.1 (21.7)	79.2 (26.2)	83.7 (28.7)	82.1 (27.8)	74.9 (23.8)	61.7 (16.5)	48.8 (9.3)	38.5 (3.6)	59.4 (15.2)
Daily mean °F (°C)	24.8 (−4.0)	26.4 (−3.1)	34.0 (1.1)	45.9 (7.7)	57.7 (14.3)	66.5 (19.2)	71.0 (21.7)	69.5 (20.8)	62.2 (16.8)	50.3 (10.2)	39.3 (4.1)	30.5 (−0.8)	48.2 (9.0)
Mean daily minimum °F (°C)	15.9 (−8.9)	16.5 (−8.6)	23.1 (−4.9)	33.4 (0.8)	44.4 (6.9)	53.9 (12.2)	58.3 (14.6)	56.9 (13.8)	49.5 (9.7)	38.8 (3.8)	29.9 (−1.2)	22.5 (−5.3)	36.9 (2.7)
Mean minimum °F (°C)	−3 (−19)	−1 (−18)	6 (−14)	21 (−6)	31 (−1)	41 (5)	47 (8)	46 (8)	36 (2)	27 (−3)	16 (−9)	6 (−14)	−6 (−21)
Record low °F (°C)	−24 (−31)	−21 (−29)	−10 (−23)	6 (−14)	21 (−6)	32 (0)	40 (4)	31 (−1)	23 (−5)	15 (−9)	3 (−16)	−16 (−27)	−24 (−31)
Average precipitation inches (mm)	2.12 (54)	1.86 (47)	2.73 (69)	3.26 (83)	3.10 (79)	4.19 (106)	4.05 (103)	3.82 (97)	4.09 (104)	3.53 (90)	2.73 (69)	2.59 (66)	38.07 (967)
Average snowfall inches (cm)	8.4 (21)	9.5 (24)	11.2 (28)	1.5 (3.8)	0.0 (0.0)	0.0 (0.0)	0.0 (0.0)	0.0 (0.0)	0.0 (0.0)	0.1 (0.25)	2.7 (6.9)	8.4 (21)	41.8 (106)
Average extreme snow depth inches (cm)	7 (18)	7 (18)	7 (18)	1 (2.5)	0 (0)	0 (0)	0 (0)	0 (0)	0 (0)	0 (0)	2 (5.1)	5 (13)	11 (28)
Average precipitation days (≥ 0.01 in)	12.2	9.8	10.6	12.5	13.2	12.6	11.8	11.4	10.6	13.0	10.6	11.8	140.1
Average snowy days (≥ 0.1 in)	6.4	5.6	3.7	0.9	0.0	0.0	0.0	0.0	0.0	0.1	1.4	3.6	21.7
Source: NOAA

== Demographics ==
Historical population
Census	Pop.	Note	%±
1870	15,863		—
1880	20,541		29.5%
1890	30,893		50.4%
1900	35,672		15.5%
1910	37,176		4.2%
1920	45,993		23.7%
1930	47,397		3.1%
1940	45,106		−4.8%
1950	49,716		10.2%
1960	46,517		−6.4%
1970	39,945		−14.1%
1980	35,327		−11.6%
1990	33,724		−4.5%
2000	30,940		−8.3%
2010	29,200		−5.6%
2020	26,523		−9.2%
U.S. Decennial Census

=== 2020 census ===
As of the 2020 census, Elmira had a population of 26,523. The median age was 36.4 years. 22.9% of residents were under the age of 18 and 14.7% of residents were 65 years of age or older. For every 100 females there were 104.1 males, and for every 100 females age 18 and over there were 104.8 males age 18 and over.

99.8% of residents lived in urban areas, while 0.2% lived in rural areas.

There were 10,646 households in Elmira, of which 27.7% had children under the age of 18 living in them. Of all households, 27.0% were married-couple households, 24.5% were households with a male householder and no spouse or partner present, and 37.1% were households with a female householder and no spouse or partner present. About 39.5% of all households were made up of individuals and 14.0% had someone living alone who was 65 years of age or older.

There were 12,407 housing units, of which 14.2% were vacant. The homeowner vacancy rate was 3.0% and the rental vacancy rate was 11.1%.

Racial composition as of the 2020 census
Race	Number	Percent
White	19,169	72.3%
Black or African American	3,960	14.9%
American Indian and Alaska Native	116	0.4%
Asian	207	0.8%
Native Hawaiian and Other Pacific Islander	11	0.0%
Some other race	523	2.0%
Two or more races	2,537	9.6%
Hispanic or Latino (of any race)	1,596	6.0%

=== 2000 census ===
As of the 2000 census, there were 30,940 people, 11,475 households, and 6,701 families residing in the city. The population density was 4,229.5 inhabitants per square mile (1,633.0/km^{2}). There were 12,895 housing units at an average density of 1,762.7 per square mile (680.6/km^{2}). The racial makeup of the city was 82.03% White, 13.05% Black or African American, 0.39% Native American, 0.49% Asian, 0.03% Pacific Islander, 1.37% from other races, and 2.64% from two or more races. Hispanic or Latino of any race were 3.14% of the population.

There were 11,475 households, out of which 31.1% had children under the age of 18 living with them, 35.3% were married couples living together, 18.4% had a female householder with no husband present, and 41.6% were non-families. 34.5% of all households were made up of individuals, and 13.6% had someone living alone who was 65 years of age or older. The average household size was 2.37 and the average family size was 3.05.

In the city, the population was spread out, with 25.1% under the age of 18, 13.0% from 18 to 24, 29.9% from 25 to 44, 18.2% from 45 to 64, and 13.8% who were 65 years of age or older. The median age was 33 years. For every 100 females, there were 101.2 males. For every 100 females age 18 and over, there were 98.2 males.

The median income for a household in the city was $27,292, and the median income for a family was $33,592. Males had a median income of $31,775 versus $22,350 for females. The per capita income for the city was $14,495. About 17.9% of families and 23.1% of the population were below the poverty line, including 32.6% of those under age 18 and 12.1% of those age 65 or over.

=== Other demographics ===
The Elmira, NY Metropolitan Statistical Area (or Elmira MSA) is frequently used for statistical information such as labor rates and includes all of Chemung County with a population in 2000 of 90,070.

The Elmira MSA was ranked as the 59th safest place to live out of 344 Metro Areas in 2005 by Morgan Quitno Press.

The three largest ethnic groups in Elmira are Irish, German and Italian.

== Economy ==
In 1889 Elmira Bridge Company opened in Elmira Heights and merged with several other bridge companies to become American Bridge Company in 1900.

In 1950, the Elmira's population peaked at about 50,000, which represented 57 percent of Chemung County's total population at the time. Today, the city has approximately 25,000 residents, which represents 34 percent of Chemung County's population. This population decline is due to the national decline in railroads and manufacturing as well as a population shift to the outer suburbs around Elmira. The Elmira Metro area has nearly 100,000 people.

The population decline began during the recession of the early 1970s during which several large employers (Ann Page, American Bridge, General Electric, American LaFrance, Westinghouse and Remington Rand) either closed their factories or moved to other states. The decline was exacerbated by the flood of 1972, during which many of the downtown businesses and single-family homes were destroyed or replaced by subsequent Urban Renewal projects in the Chemung River flood plain.

U.S. Steel acquired the American Bridge plant but it too was shuttered in 1983 until a succession of transportation firms took the site: Sumirail and ABB Traction from 1986 to 1991 before it was acquired by Adtranz from 1991 to 2000.

=== Current manufacturing employers ===
Anchor Glass Container Corporation, headquartered in Tampa, Florida, is in the old Thatcher Glass facility in Elmira Heights. Anchor Glass produces a diverse line of flint, amber, green and other colored glass containers of various types and designs for the beer, food, beverage and liquor markets in North America. Anchor Glass is now wholly owned by the Ardagh Group S.A.

CAF-USA Inc has its main U.S. plant in Elmira Heights on the site of the former American Bridge Company since 2000. CAF USA is a subsidiary company of Construcciones y Auxiliar de Ferrocarriles, a Spanish manufacturer of passenger rail products (including trains, high-speed trains, locomotives, light rail vehicles and other rail equipment). CAF-USA Inc trains are typically designed for North America's market, based on Spanish design and technologies.

Elmira Heat Treating, established in 1962 in Elmira, offers a wide variety of heat treatment technologies to both domestic and international customers such as Hilliard Corp., Ford Motors, General Signal and others.

Hardinge, Inc. (formerly Hardinge Brothers), established in 1890 and now headquartered in Elmira, manufactures precise turning machines for the domestic and international market. Starting in 1995, Hardinge began expanding their product line and over the years has acquired L. Kellenberger & Co. AG, Hauser-Tripet-Tschudin AG, Jones & Shipman, and Usach Technologies, Inc. In 2004 they also acquired Bridgeport, world-famous for its milling machines and machining centers.

Hilliard Corporation, established in 1905, has two locations in Elmira and serves the international market in filters, brakes, clutches and starters for a variety of industrial and commercial uses as well as consumer equipment from Polaris and MTD.

Kennedy Valve, located in Elmira since 1905, is one of the world's largest manufacturers of products for waterworks distribution, potable and wastewater treatment, and fire protection system projects. They are most famous for their fire hydrants which can be found around the world. Kennedy Valve was acquired by McWane in 1988.

Trayer Products, established in 1929, manufactures parts mostly for the heavy truck industry; primarily truck chassis parts such as king pins and shackles.

== Arts and culture ==
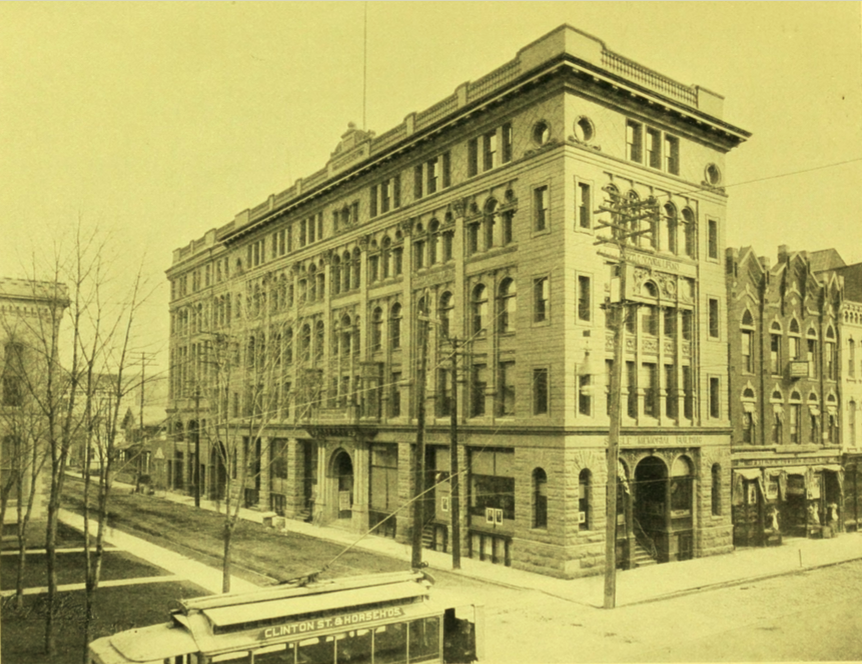
Steele Memorial Library

On at least two hilltops near the city (mostly on Harris Hill to the northwest) pioneer pilots established the sport of gliding in America. Harris Hill is the site of the National Soaring Museum and was also used for glider trainings during World War 2. These sites are now recognized as National Landmarks of Soaring.

The SS Elmira Victory, a World War 2 era Victory Ship, was named after the city.

- Dunn Field is a baseball stadium along the southern banks of the Chemung River. The Elmira Pioneers play at Dunn Field. Famous players and managers who have played or managed at Dunn Field include Babe Ruth, Earl Weaver, Don Zimmer, Wade Boggs, and Curt Schilling.
- Elmira College is in the city.
- The Lake Erie College of Osteopathic Medicine has a branch of its medical school where Arnot Park was formerly located.
- The Clemens Center is a concert and theater center named after Samuel Clemens, (Mark Twain).
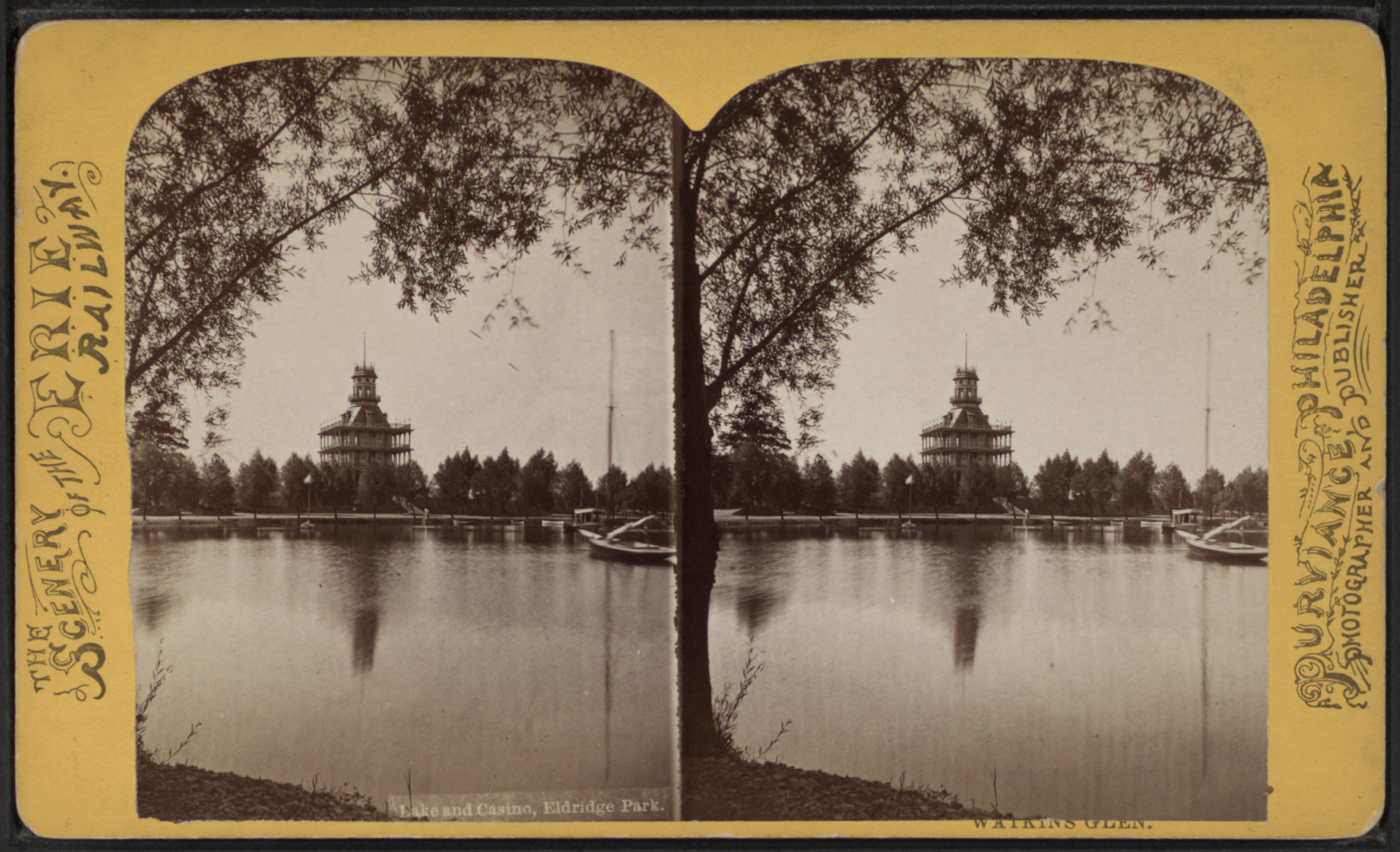
  Lake and casino, Eldridge Park, by Purviance, William T.
- The Arnot Art Museum is in the downtown Civic-Historic District.
- Eldridge Park features a restored 1890s Looff Carousel
- Woodlawn Cemetery and Woodlawn National Cemetery are both in the City of Elmira in the Northwest sector. Mark Twain and his family are buried in Woodlawn Cemetery.
- LECOM Event Center (originally known as the Coach USA Center, later First Arena), which opened in 2000, is currently home to the Elmira Aviators of the North American Hockey League. It was previously home to the Elmira Jackals of the UHL and ECHL from 2000 to 2017, as well as three other teams in the FPHL: the Elmira Enforcers, from 2018 to 2021; the Elmira Mammoth, from 2022 to 2023; and the Elmira River Sharks from 2023 to 2024.

=== Historic places ===
The following are listed on the National Register of Historic Places:

- The John Brand Jr. House
- John Brand Sr. House
- Buildings at 104–116 West Water St.
- Chemung Canal Bank Building
- Chemung County Courthouse Complex
- Clinton–Columbia Historic District
- Elmira Civic Historic District
- Elmira Coca-Cola Bottling Company Works
- Elmira College Old Campus
- Emmanuel Episcopal Church
- Erste Deutsche Evangelische Kirche
- Alexander Eustace House
- Fire Station No. 4
- William S. Gerity House
- F. M. Howell and Company
- John W. Jones House
- Maple Avenue Historic District
- Near Westside Historic District
- Newtown Battlefield State Park
- Park Church
- Pentecostal Holy Temple Church of Jesus Christ
- Pratt House
- Quarry Farm
- Mark Twain Study
- St. Patrick's Parochial Residence-Convent and School
- Trinity Church
- Woodlawn Cemetery and Woodlawn National Cemetery

== Parks and recreation ==
Elmira has more than 20 parks including Eldridge Park with a walking trail, restored carousel, skateboard park, and fishing lake and Wisner Park with memorials to veterans from World War I, World War II, the Vietnam War and the Fallen Officers Memorial.

== Government ==
Mayors of Elmira
Mayor	Party	Term
Daniel J. Mandell	R	2016–present
Susan J. Skidmore	D	2012–2015
John S. Tonello	D	2006–2011
J. William O'Brien	D	3/2005-2006
Stephen M. Hughes	D	1998-2/2005
Howard F. Townsend	R	1994–1997
James E. Hare	D	1988–1993
Stephen J. Fesh Jr.	R	1984–1987
Mary P. Ciccariello	D	1982–1983
Robert G. Densberger	R	1980–1981
John M. Kennedy	D	1976–1979
Richard C. Loll	R	1972–1975
Edward T. Lagonegro	D	1968–1971
Howard H. Kimball	R	1966–1967
Edward T. Lagonegro	D	1962–1965
Edward A. Mooers	R	1956–1961
Emory Strachen	R	1940–1955
J. Maxwell Beers	R	1936–1939
Henry W. Honan	D	1934–1935
W. Glenn Sweet	R	1932–1933
Frank P. Robinson	D	1930–1931
David N. Heller	D	1926–1929
J. Norton Wood	R	1922–1925
George W. Peck	D	1920–1921
Harry N. Hoffman	-	1914–1919
Daniel Sheehan	D	1908–1913
Z. Reed Brockway	-	1906–1907
William T. Coleman	R	1904–1905
Daniel Sheehan	D	1902–1903
Frank H. Flood	R	1900–1902
Edgar Denton	D	1898–1900
Frederick Collin	D	1894–1898
David C. Robinson	R & Ind Citizens	1892–1894
Charles S. Davison	D	1888–1892
John B. Stanchfield	D	1886–1888
Henry Flood	R	1884–1886
Stephen T. Arnot	D	12/28/1882–1884
David B. Hill	D	1882
Alexander Diven	R	1880–1882
Granville D. Parsons	Greenbacker	1878–1880
Robert T. Turner	D	1876–1878
Howard M. Smith	R	1875–1876
John Arnot, Jr.	D	1874–1875
Luther Caldwell	D	1873–1874
Patrick Henry Flood	R	1871–1873
John Arnot, Jr.	D	1870–1871
Stephen McDonald	D	1868–1870
Eaton N. Frisbie	R	1867–1868
John I. Nicks	R	1865–1867
John Arnot, Jr.	D	1864–1865
* Source: City Clerk of the City of Elmira

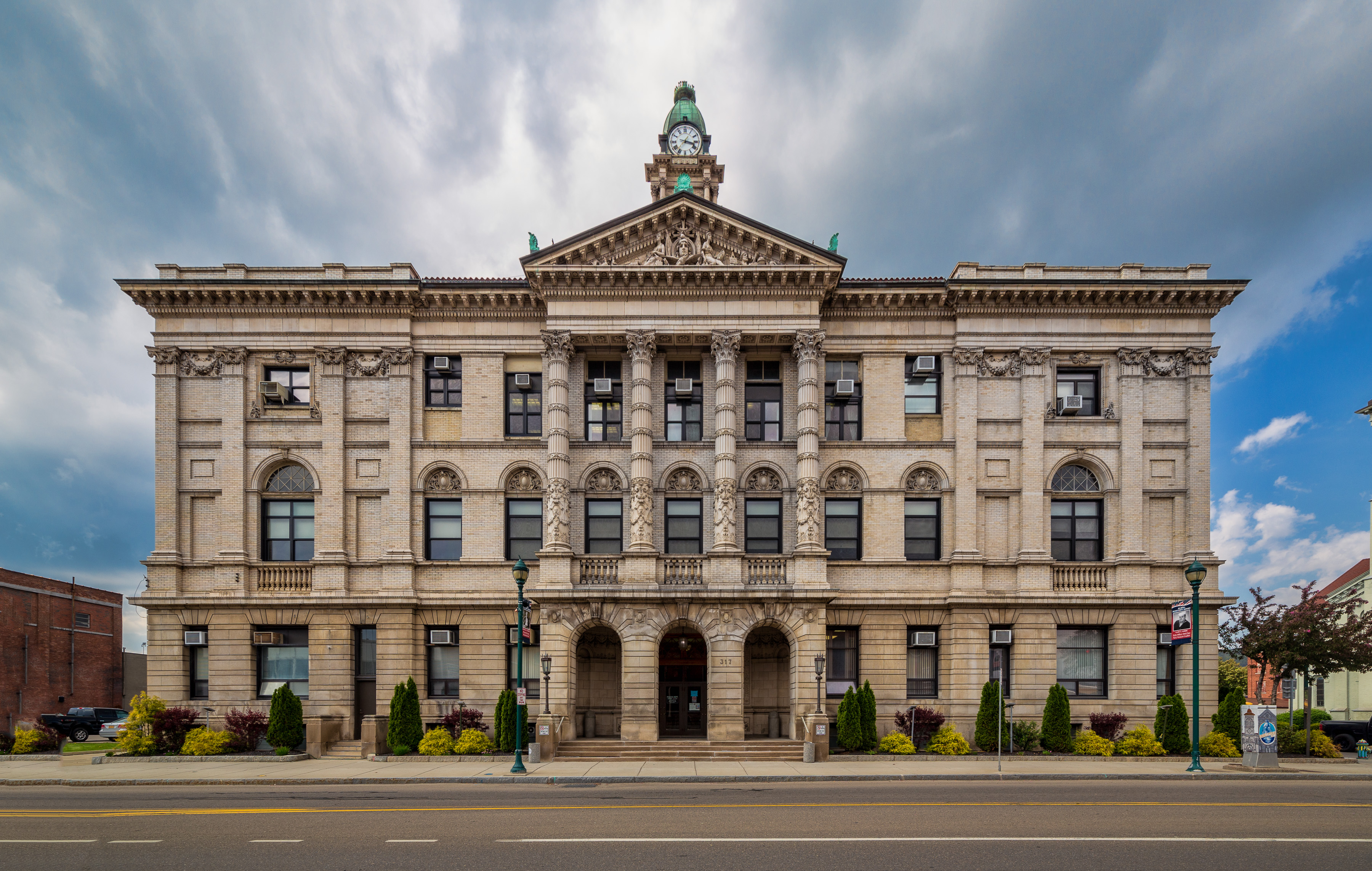
Elmira City Hall

The city government is a Council-Manager form of government in which the City Manager is the primary administrator of the city. There is one mayor elected at large and six council members elected from each of six council districts. The term of office of the mayor and council members was two years, until a 2003 referendum extended the terms to four years (four-year terms began after the 2007 election). The mayor and council members are all part-time employees. The City Manager, City Clerk, City Chamberlain, City Assessor, and Corporation Counsel are all appointed by the City Council. All remaining department heads serve at the request of the City Manager.

The city received $1.4 million in Community Development Block Grant funds and $368,000 in HOME funds in FY2006-2007 from the U.S. Department of Housing and Urban Development. These funds are used for programs and projects for low-moderate income families and neighborhood blocks.

== Education ==
Elmira City School District is the school district.

== Media ==
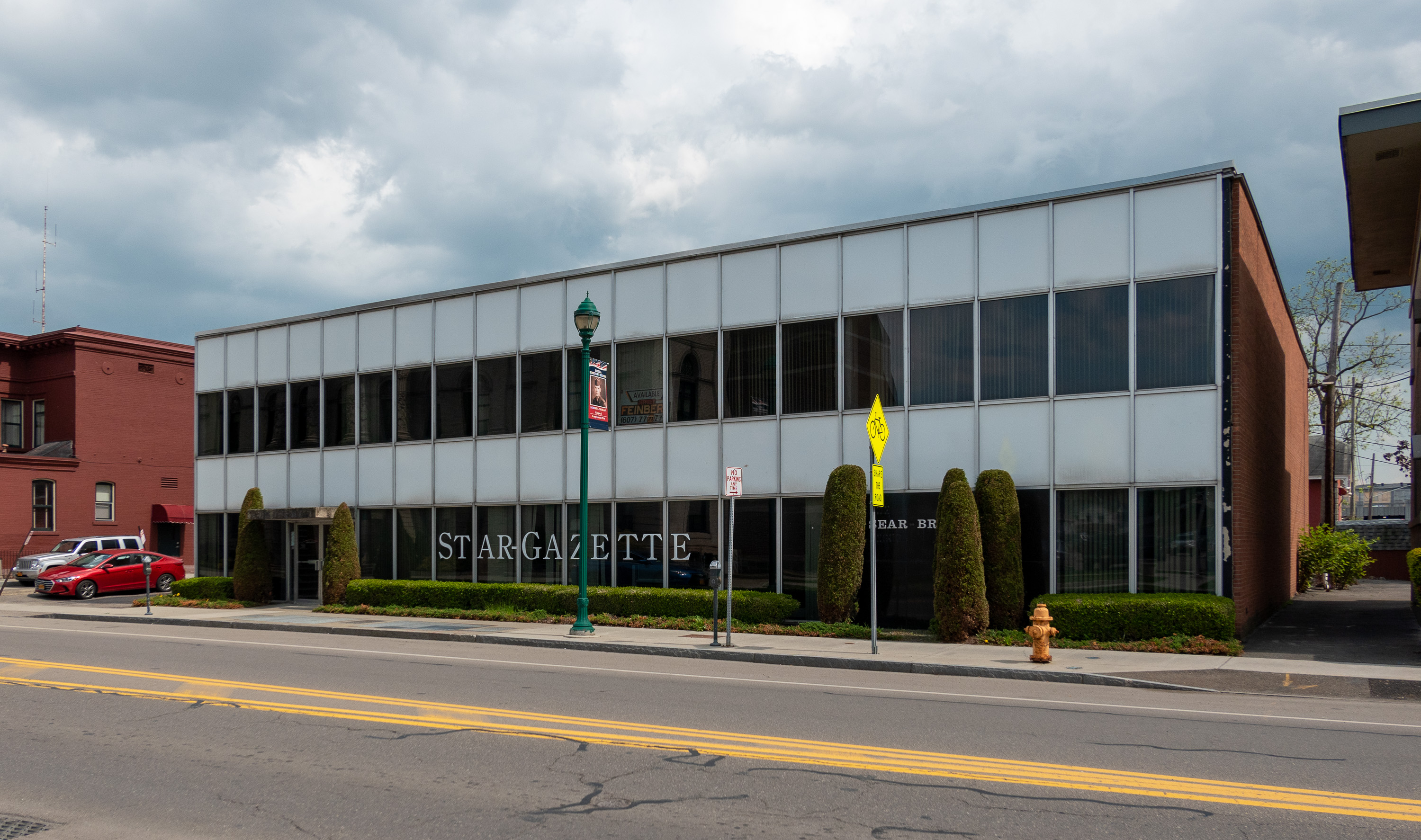
Star-Gazette building

=== Newspapers ===
- Star-Gazette, daily morning newspaper owned by Gannett Co. Inc. It was Gannett's first newspaper.
- Chemung Valley Reporter, weekly newspaper based in nearby Horseheads .

=== Radio ===
- WCIH
- WNKI
- WCBF
- WELM
- WLVY
- WPIE (studio in Elmira, tower in Trumansburg)
- WOKN
- WKPQ / WHHO (studio in Hornell)
- WLEA / WCKR (studio in Hornell)
- WCID
- WENI-FM
- WPGO

=== Television ===
- WETM 18 (NBC on DT1/The CW Plus on DT2)
- WSKA 30 (PBS, simulcast of WSKG-TV) (licensed to Corning, with which Elmira shares TV market)
- WENY-TV 36 (ABC on DT1/CBS on DT2/Independent on DT3) (studio in Horseheads, licensed to Elmira)
- WJKP-LD 39 (MyNetworkTV) (studio and license in Corning, with which Elmira shares TV market)
- WYDC 48 (FOX) (studio and license in Corning, with which Elmira shares TV market)

== Infrastructure ==
=== Transportation ===
==== Public transit ====
The Chemung County Transit System operates regularly scheduled fixed route service within the City of Elmira and Village of Horseheads. Another route links Elmira with Corning Community College, also linking passengers with the Steuben County Transit System (SCT) and Corning Erwin Area Transit System (CEATS).

Elmira is served by several intercity bus operators. New York Trailways serves Elmira on one of its routes between Binghamton and Rochester. Short Line serves Elmira on its route between Binghamton and Olean. OurBus provides service to Elmira on a route between New York City and Niagara Falls. Fullington Trailways discontinued service between Elmira and Williamsport, Pennsylvania in April 2022.

==== Air transportation ====
The Elmira Corning Regional Airport (IATA code ELM, ICAO code KELM) is a medium-size regional airport, and the only area airport that offers scheduled airline service. Located 7 miles (11 km) northwest of downtown, the airport has non-stop flights to Detroit in addition to seasonal flights to Atlanta served by Delta Air Lines, and two routes to Florida served by Allegiant Air with the airline serving seasonal flights to Punta Gorda and Myrtle Beach.

=== Police and fire ===
The city police department employs approximately 81 full-time officers. The city fire department employs approximately 60 full-time firefighters and officers.

== Notable people ==
- John Alexander, racing driver
- Tedd Arnold, author and illustrator
- John Arnot, Jr., politician, Civil War soldier
- Elizabeth Frawley Bagley, U.S. Ambassador to Brazil
- Charlie Baker, Former Governor of Massachusetts
- Ray W. Barker, Major General, US Army
- Tracy Beadle (1808–1877), druggist, banker, and politician
- John Beecher, NHL player for the Calgary Flames
- James R. Beckwith, Wisconsin state assembly
- Simeon Benjamin (1792—1868), businessman, philanthropist, and benefactor of Elmira College
- Zebulon Brockway (1827–1920) known as the "Father of prison reform," directed the Elmira Reformatory
- Dan Caine, U.S. Air Force general and current Chairman of the Joint Chiefs of Staff
- Olivia "Livy" Langdon Clemens, wife of Mark Twain
- Chip Coffey, psychic, television personality
- Frederick Collin, lawyer, judge, Mayor of Elmira
- Eileen Collins, astronaut
- Harriet Maxwell Converse, author, folklorist, Native American civil rights advocate
- Clara Cook, All-American Girls Professional Baseball League player
- Ernie Davis, football player, first African-American Heisman Trophy winner (1961)
- Alexander S. Diven, former US Army officer and Congressman
- Stan Drulia, ice hockey player and coach
- John G. Farnsworth, Adjutant General of New York
- Jacob Sloat Fassett, politician
- Clyde Fitch, playwright
- Thomas S. Flood, former US Congressman
- Dan Forrest, Jr., composer
- John Franchi, mixed martial arts fighter
- Henry Friendly, judge, U.S. Court of Appeals for the Second Circuit
- Rosalie Lorraine Gill, painter
- Burt Gillett, director of animated films
- Emmett Goff, pioneering horticulturist, inventor, writer and educator
- Charles Tomlinson Griffes, composer
- Sam Groom, actor
- Jason Butler Harner, actor
- Bud Heine, former Baseball player for the New York Giants.
- Lewis Henry, former US Congressman
- Bruce Heyman, former U.S. Ambassador to Canada
- Tommy Hilfiger, fashion designer
- Edward M. Hoffman, New York National Guard brigadier general
- Molly Huddle, Olympic runner
- John W. Jones, underground railroad agent
- Matt Knowles, pro wrestler
- Warren D. Leary, Wisconsin State Assemblyman and newspaper publisher
- Kirt Manwaring, former Major League Baseball player
- Charles Thomas McMillen, basketball player, politician
- Norman A. Mordue, QB Syracuse University. Served with 1stAirCav Viet Nam. Currently U.S. Federal Judge 3rd District, Syracuse, NY
- Frederick C. Painton, journalist, publicist, pulp-fiction author, WWII war correspondent, veterans advocate
- Anna Campbell Palmer (1854–1928), author, editor
- William P. Perry, producer and composer
- Aurora Phelps, land reformer, labor leader, women's rights advocate
- Beth Phoenix, WWE Hall of Famer
- Jeanine Pirro, television host, author, and former New York State judge, prosecutor, and politician
- Jeff Plate, drummer for Trans-Siberian Orchestra
- Margaret L. Plunkett (1906-2000), labor economist, diplomat
- Anna Beach Pratt, American educator and social worker.
- Dan Quinlan, actor
- Hal Roach, film producer
- Jane Roberts, writer and psychic - (1929–1984), author, psychic and trance or spirit medium.
- Hosea H. Rockwell, former US Congressman
- Francis Asbury Roe, naval officer
- John Hersh Seinfeld, chemical engineer and atmospheric scientist, awarded the Tyler Prize for Environmental Achievement
- Alice J. Shaw, whistling performer in vaudeville
- Frederick B. Shaw, U.S. Army brigadier general
- Joey Sindelar, pro golfer
- Horace B. Smith, former US Congressman
- Esther Baker Steele (1835–1911), educator, author, traveler, philanthropist
- Joel Dorman Steele, educator and author
- John Surratt, son of Mary Surratt
- Art Sykes, boxer
- Mark Twain, writer
- Asher Tyler, former US Congressman
- Lewis Sayre Van Duzer, US Navy officer
- Antha Minerva Virgil, composer and inventor
- John Joseph Wantuck, US Marine awarded Navy Cross
- Bob Waterfield, college and pro football player, husband of actress Jane Russell
- Brian Williams, television news anchor
- Jason Wise, actor
- Don Zimmer, Major League Baseball player and manager
- Aeryn Gillern, Missing person, UNIDO worker
