= Fire Station No. 4 (Elmira, New York) =

- U.S. National Register of Historic Places
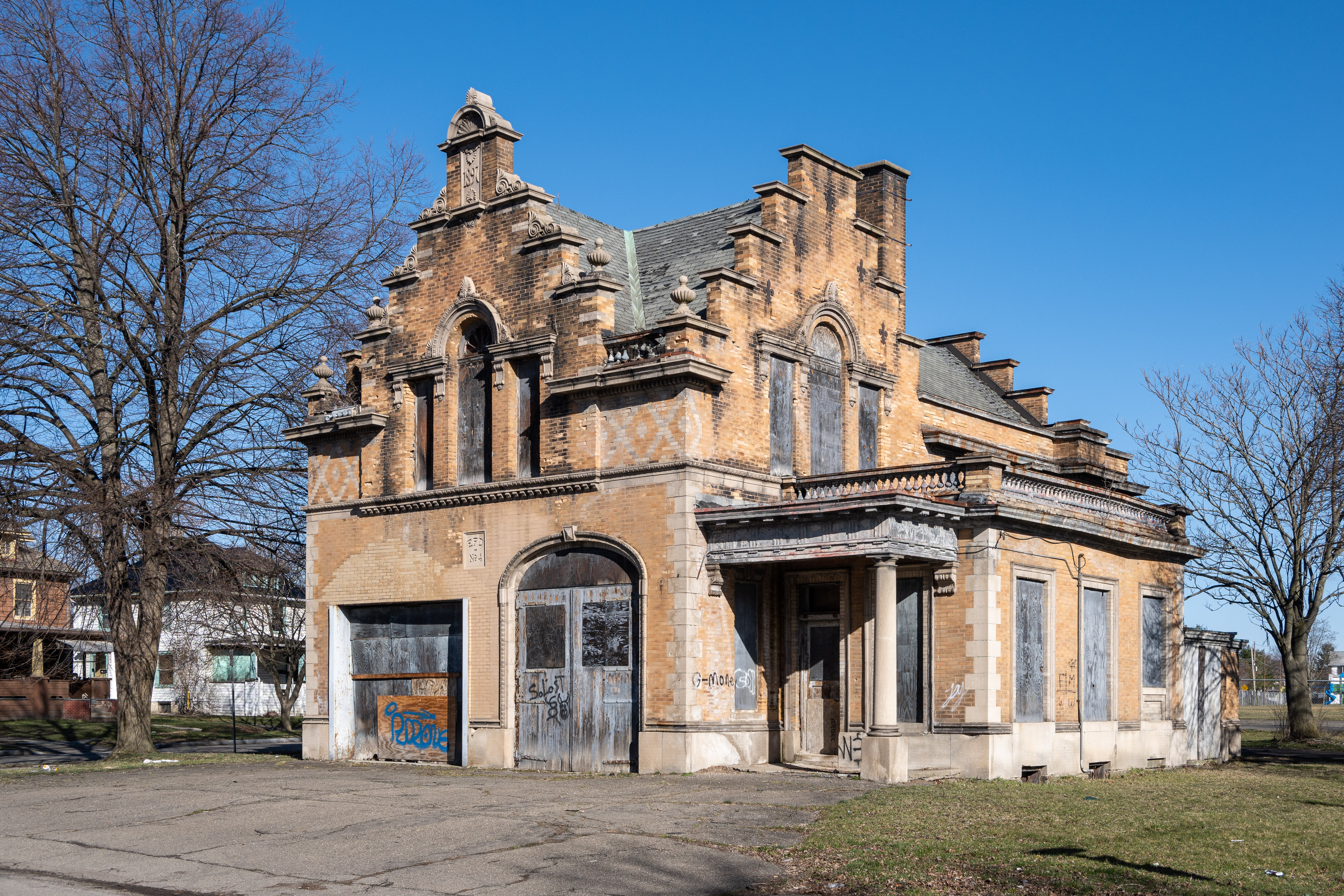

- Location within New York Location within the United States
- Location: Elmira, New York
- Coordinates: 42°6′17″N 76°48′26″W
- Built: 1897
- Architect: Pierce & Bickford
- Architectural style: Renaissance
- NRHP reference No.: 88000242
- Added to NRHP: March 24, 1988

Fire Station No. 4, also known as the Maxwell Place Fire Station, is located at 301 Maxwell Place, Elmira, New York. It was designed by local architects Pierce & Bickford. It was built in 1897, and is significant as an example of firehouse design around the start of the 20th century.

== Gallery ==
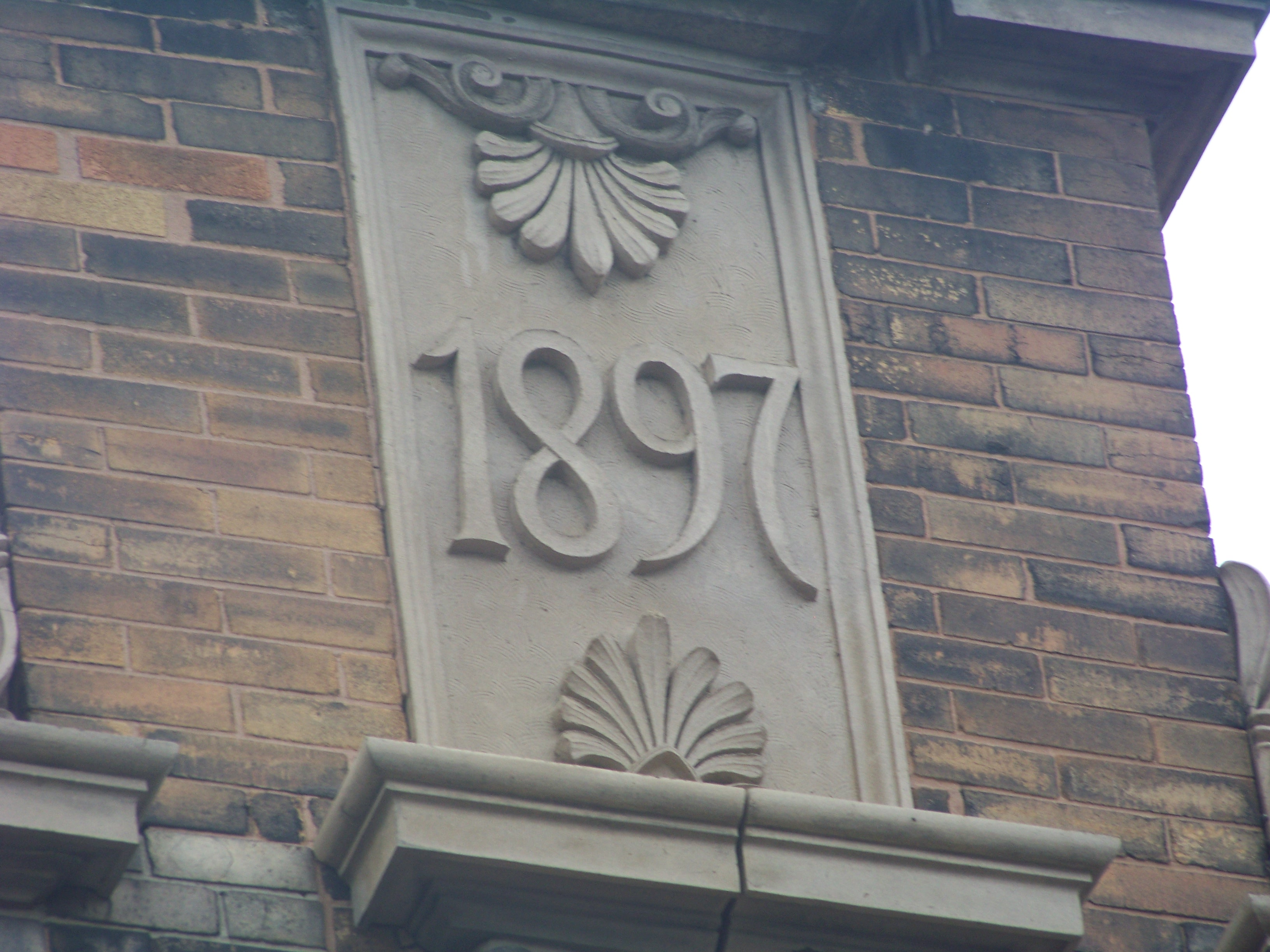
Year detail

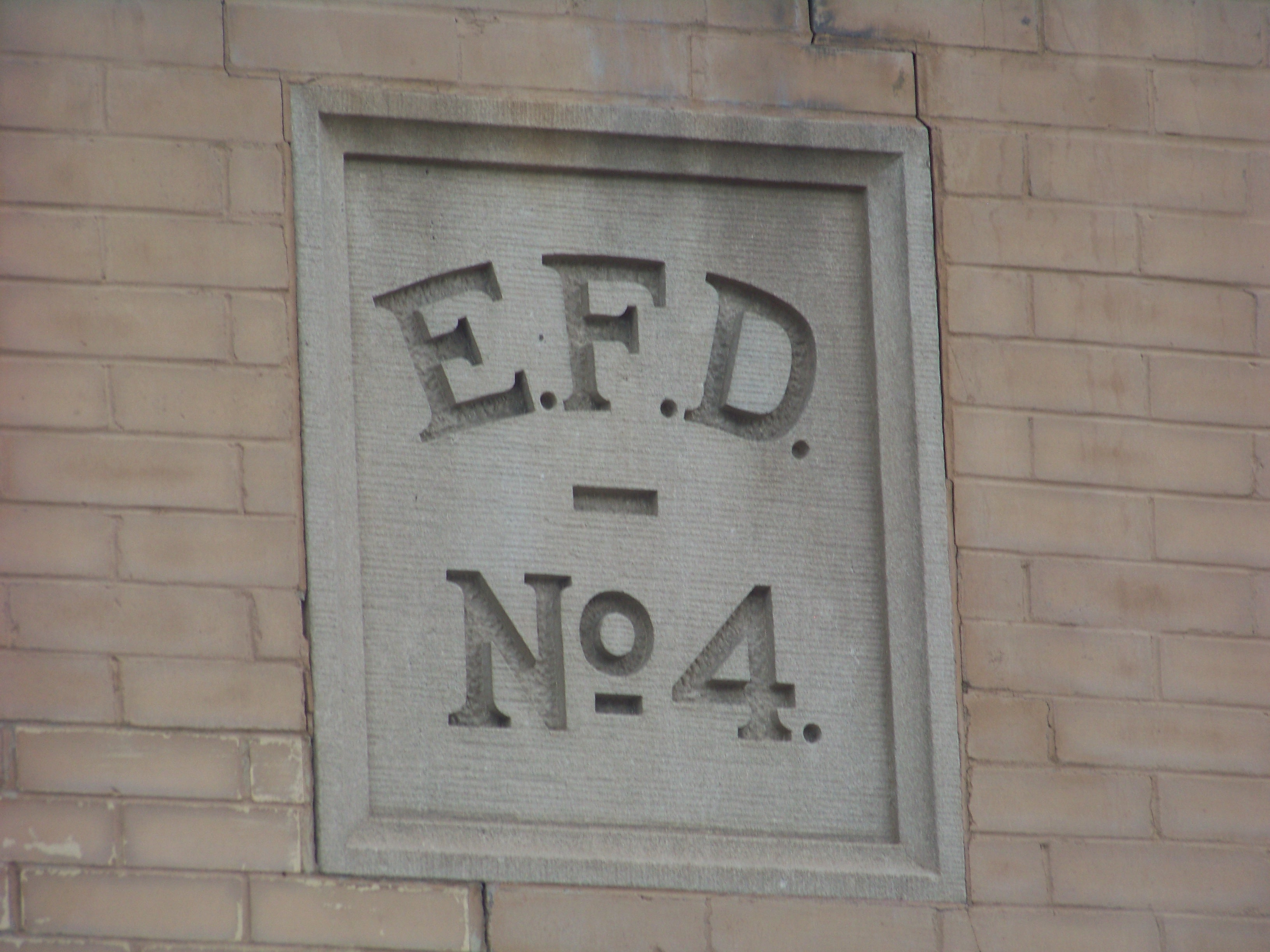
Station number detail
