= Alice J. Shaw =

American musical performer (1853–1918)

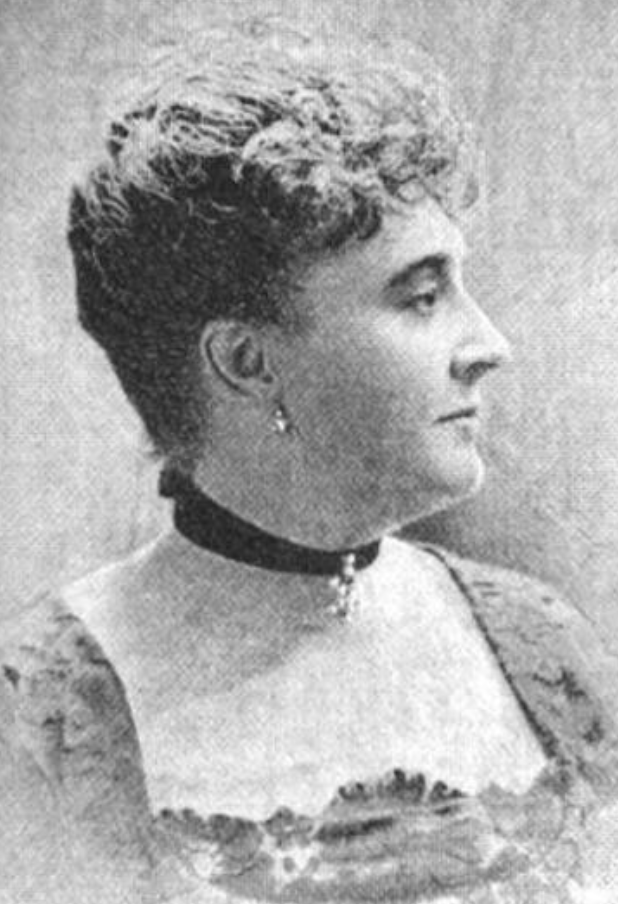
- Born: Alice J. Horton; 1853; Elmira, New York, U.S.
- Died: 1918 (aged 64–65)
- Occupation: Professional whistler

Alice J. Shaw (née Horton; 1853 – 1918) was an American musical performer, who was billed as "The Whistling Prima Donna" and, in French, "La Belle Siffleuse".

== Biography ==
Shaw was born in 1853 in Elmira, New York, the daughter of William Horton, a stock broker. Shaw was a tomboy who as a girl, climbed trees and whistled, which was seen as a boy's hobby in the 1800's. Her parents didn't support her talent, which left her quitting it originally.

She married W.H. Shaw, and the couple moved to Detroit, Michigan. Shaw's oldest two daughters were born in Detroit. After her father's business failed, they moved to New York City where her youngest twin daughters were born. Soon after, the family moved into Shaw's childhood home in Elmira while she worked in both Elmira and New York City, where she started professionally whistling again, this time as work. Alice J. Shaw toured Europe and India performing as a whistler, starting in 1886 with a performance for teachers at Steinway Hall in New York City. In England the following year, she whistled for the Prince of Wales.

Because a "whistling woman" was sometimes considered vulgar or unwise, Shaw was careful to craft her shows with the utmost decorum, both in her physical movements and in her facial expressions. Reviewers remarked on her ability to follow sheet music, which emphasized her self-discipline. An anonymous New York Times reviewer, however, commented that "her notions of melody are weird and uncanny ... and reminds one of little children, in that she ought to be seen but not heard. However, she seems determined to make a noise ..." Another reviewer that year acknowledged her uniqueness, and hoped she would remain so, because "a generation of whistlers is an appalling thing to imagine".

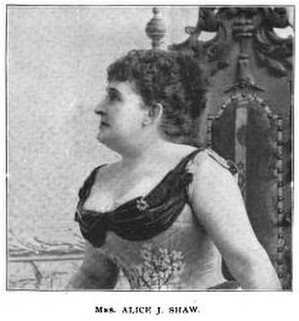
Shaw in an 1896 publication

Later in life, she performed with two of her daughters, Ethel and Elsie, whistling and singing twins known as "the May Blossoms". Shaw also made some of the earliest recordings of whistling. In 1888, while touring England, she made wax cylinders with Thomas Edison's representative, George Edward Gouraud. She later made commercial recordings, some of which have survived. She was also one of the earliest celebrity spokeswomen for a weight loss product, in 1897 adverts for "Dr. Edison Obesity Pills and Obesity Fruit Salts".

== Personal life and death ==
Alice Horton married William Holland Shaw. They had four daughters before they divorced in 1888. There was a rumor that she divorced to marry "Buffalo Bill", William Cody. She testified that she had no material assets and lived with her aunt in 1903. She hoped to marry again, to David L. Howell, but he died in 1907, before their wedding. She died in 1918, aged 64 or 65.

== Sample from 1907 ==
Alice J. Shaw and her daughters whistling

A 1907 recording of Alice Shaw and her twin daughters performing a whistling trio, "Spring-tide Revels"
