= Emmett Goff =

American horticulturist

Emmett Stull Goff
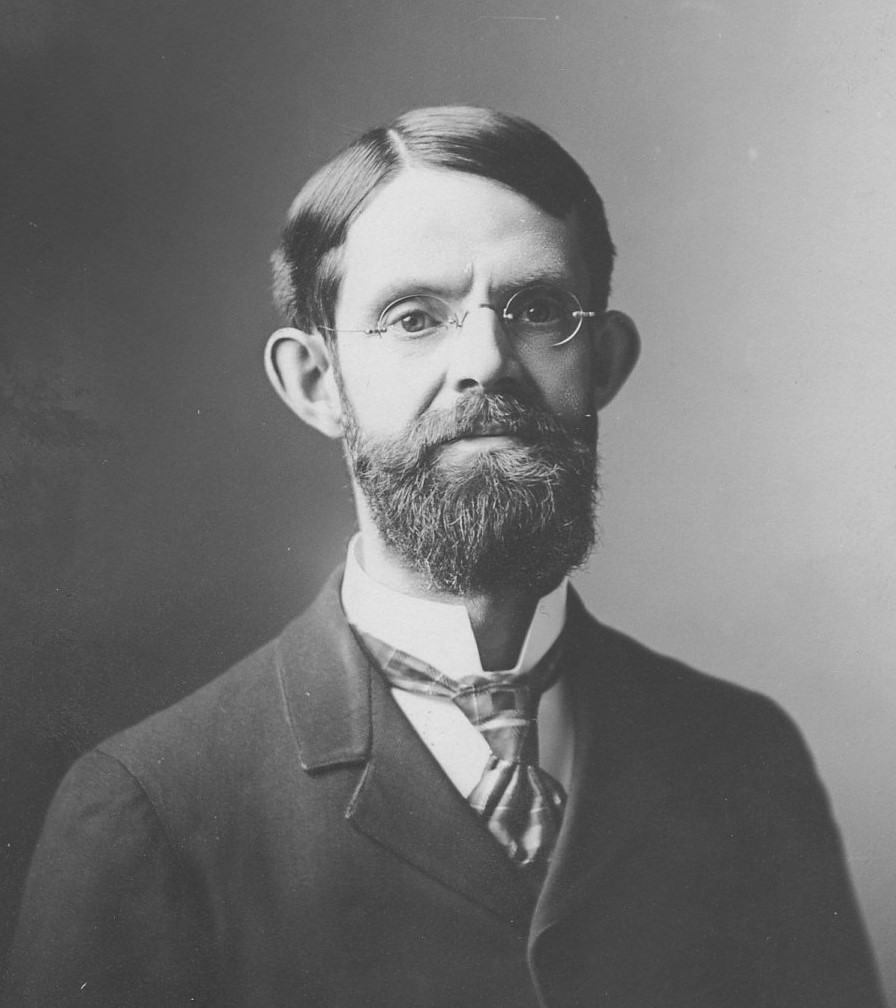
- Emmett Stull Goff taken in 1901
- Born: September 3, 1852; Elmira, New York
- Died: June 6, 1902; Madison, Wisconsin
- Occupation: Professor of Horticulture
- Notable work: Principles of Plant Culture (1897)

Emmett Stull Goff (1852-1902) was a pioneering horticulturist, inventor, writer and educator best known for his early promotion of the cherry growing industry in Door County, Wisconsin.

== Early life and career ==
Emmett Stull Goff was born on September 3, 1852, on a farm just south of Elmira, New York one of a family that eventually numbered five brothers and three sisters. Goff attended the common schools of New York and the Elmira Free Academy, from which he graduated in 1870. For the next five years, he worked on the family farm. By 1875, despite not having any formal experience as a teacher, he began a short career as a schoolmaster in Elmira.

== New York Geneva Agricultural Experiment Station ==
When the New York Geneva Agricultural Experiment Station was founded in 1882 to focus on agricultural scientific research and the establishment of experimental plantings, Goff was hired as the Station's first horticulturist by Edward Lewis Sturtevant. An early project was to develop a botanical listing of the known vegetables propagated and marketed by nurserymen in New York State, a catalog that extends over 190 pages.

His work on apple varieties culminated in a report that was, at the time, the "most noteworthy collection of its kind in the United States" containing over 700 named varieties of apples and crabapples . While developing his classification of plants of New York, Goff published his observations on cross fertilization relating to the dominance and recessiveness in certain characters of the common garden pea, seventeen years before the rediscovery in 1900 of Gregor Mendel’s Law of Genetic Inheritance.

In the 1880s The Geneva Station was under pressure to achieve visible results that could be exhibited to farmers. Goff was involved with establishing small plots demonstrating the effectiveness of new fertilizers, insecticides or varieties alongside control plots devoted to the old way of doing things.

== University of Wisconsin - Madison ==
The Wisconsin Agriculture Experiment Station was established in 1883 at a time when the decline in agricultural productivity due to infertile soils was a growing concern. Goff was recruited to Wisconsin in 1889 by his Geneva Station colleague Stephen M. Babcock who had joined the staff a year earlier. Subsequently, Dean William Arnon Henry appointed Goff as the university's first Professor of Horticulture and as the Horticulturist to the University Agricultural Experiment Station.

At Wisconsin, Goff investigated therapy of apple scab, potato blight and scab, corn smut, onion mold, spot disease of strawberries, and grape mildew and rot, in addition to the development of reagents and spray machinery. Perhaps his best single work was the study carried on at Madison and the University of Chicago on "The Time and the Manner of the Formation of Flower Buds in Fruit Trees" published in 1899.

Goff authored Principles of Plant Culture (1897) which by 1916 had reached its eighth edition. This volume was followed by Lessons in Pomology (1899) and Lessons in Commercial Fruit Growing (1902)

Goff planted an orchard on the Madison Agriculture Station grounds seeking fruit trees hardy enough for Wisconsin's winters. In travels around the state and in conjunction with orchardist Arthur L. Hatch, Goff discovered that Door County, Wisconsin – the peninsula on the east shore of Wisconsin that extends into Lake Michigan - is remarkably suited for fruit growing. The subsequent growth of the cherry industry brought Door County national prominence.

In the classroom, Goff built a student enrollment from less than a dozen to more than 300 by 1902. This was at a time when there were few departments in the college and presumably every student took at least one course in horticulture as part of their program.

== Death ==
Goff died suddenly on June 6, 1902, at age 49 as a result of unsuccessful intestinal surgery. He was buried in the Forest Hill Cemetery in Madison, Wisconsin.
