= Pentecostal Holy Temple Church of Jesus Christ =

Historic church in New York, United States

- U.S. National Register of Historic Places
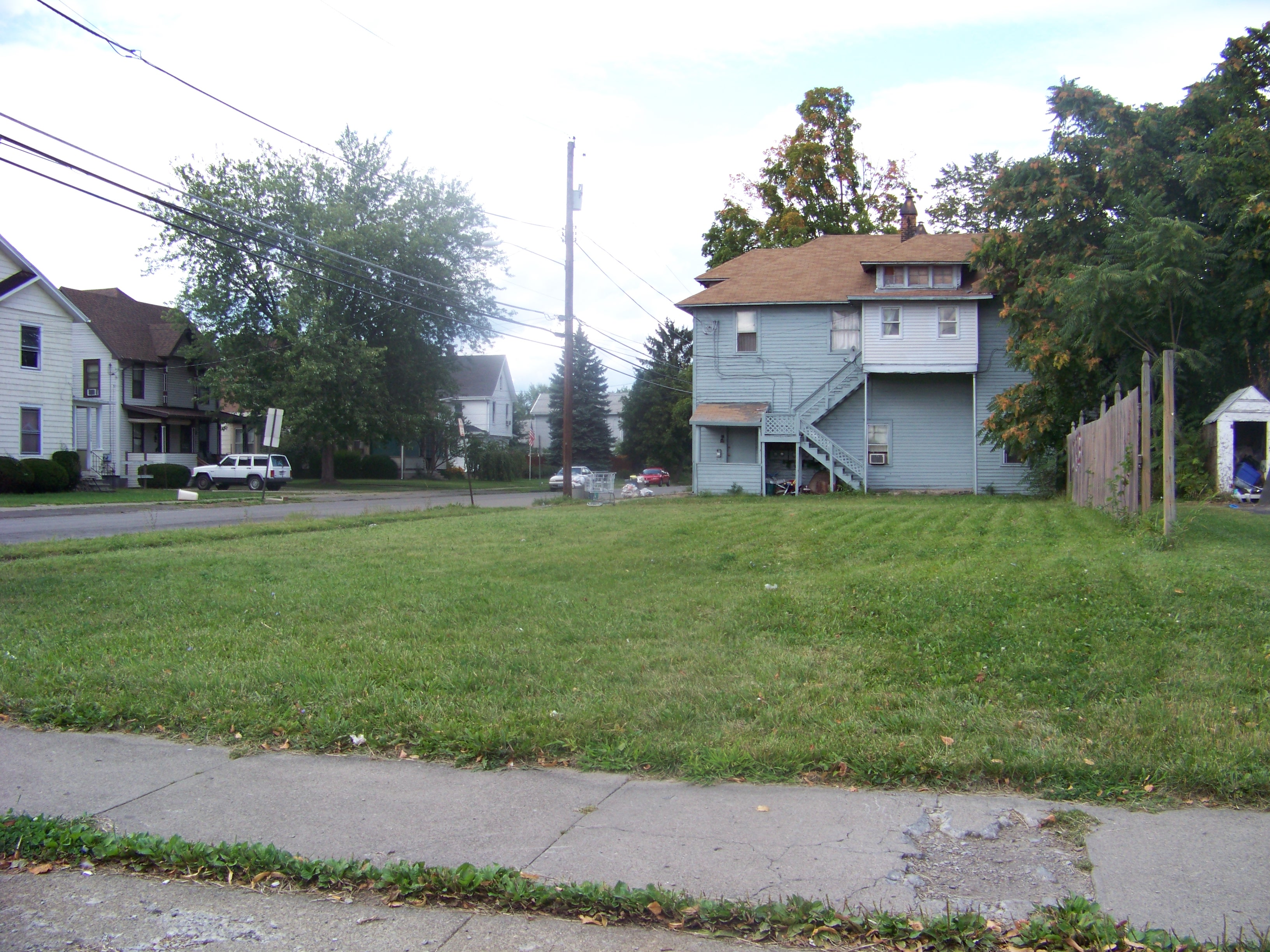
- Empty lot at 351 Division St., Elmira, NY

- Location within New York Location within the United States
- Location: 351 Division St., Elmira, New York
- Coordinates: 42°6′26″N 76°48′31″W
- Area: less than one acre
- Built: 1882
- Architectural style: Late Gothic Revival
- NRHP reference No.: 98001387
- Added to NRHP: November 19, 1998

Pentecostal Holy Temple Church of Jesus Christ, formerly known as The Free Baptist Church, was a historic Baptist church located at Elmira in Chemung County, New York. It was built in 1882 and is an example of late 19th century Gothic Revival style ecclesiastical architecture. The building has been demolished.

It was listed on the National Register of Historic Places in 1998.
