= F. M. Howell and Company =

- U.S. National Register of Historic Places
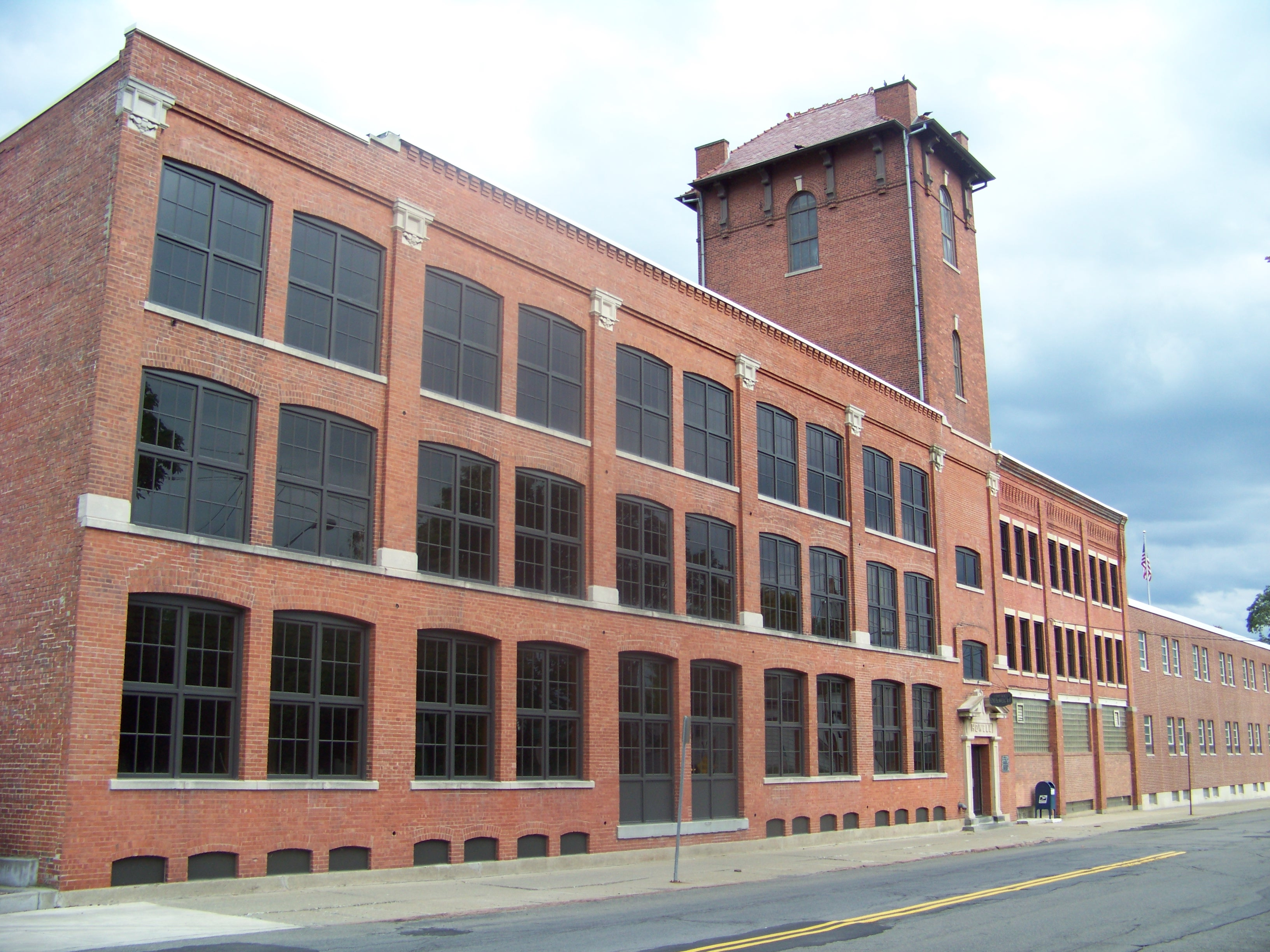
- F. M. Howell and Company, Buildings 2 & 3

- Location within New York Location within the United States
- Location: 79-105 Pennsylvania Ave., 50 Pennsylvania Ave., Elmira, New York
- Coordinates: 42°5′11″N 76°48′4″W
- Built: 1896
- Architects: Pierce & Bickford; Joseph H. Considine
- Architectural style: Renaissance, Italian Renaissance
- NRHP reference No.: 84002069
- Added to NRHP: August 27, 1984

F.M. Howell and Company is a late nineteenth-century manufacturing complex located on the banks of the Chemung River in Elmira, New York. F.M. Howell & Company was founded in 1883 in Elmira, New York by Fred M. Howell and John Aldrich. In its early years the company started out by producing wood and strawboard cigar and shoe boxes for other manufacturing companies. As this continued, they also added rigid paperboard boxes, and printing of box wraps and labels. Subsequently, this all led into the carton manufacturing, and plastic thermoforming for packaging. Later on, Howell got help from his cousin to help expand the company's horizons.

Of the five contributing buildings, four are located on the east side of Pennsylvania Avenue (Buildings 1, 2, 3 & 5), while only the Brand Building is located on the west side of the street. It was added to the National Register of Historic Places in 1984. F.M. Howell and & Company was the oldest independent manufacturer for the 19th century.

== Gallery ==
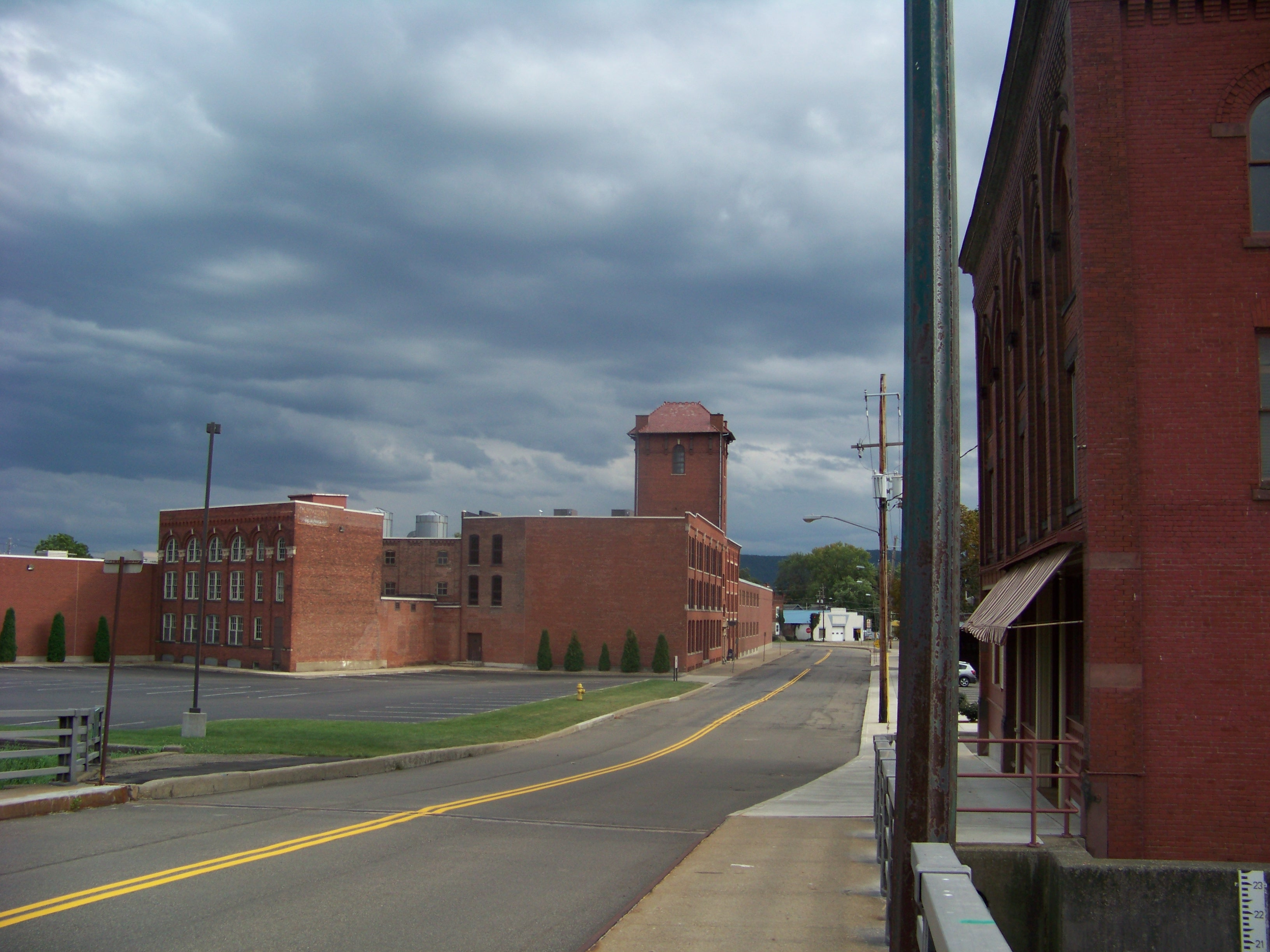
Numbered buildings to the east (left) and Brand Building to the west (right) of Pennsylvania Avenue

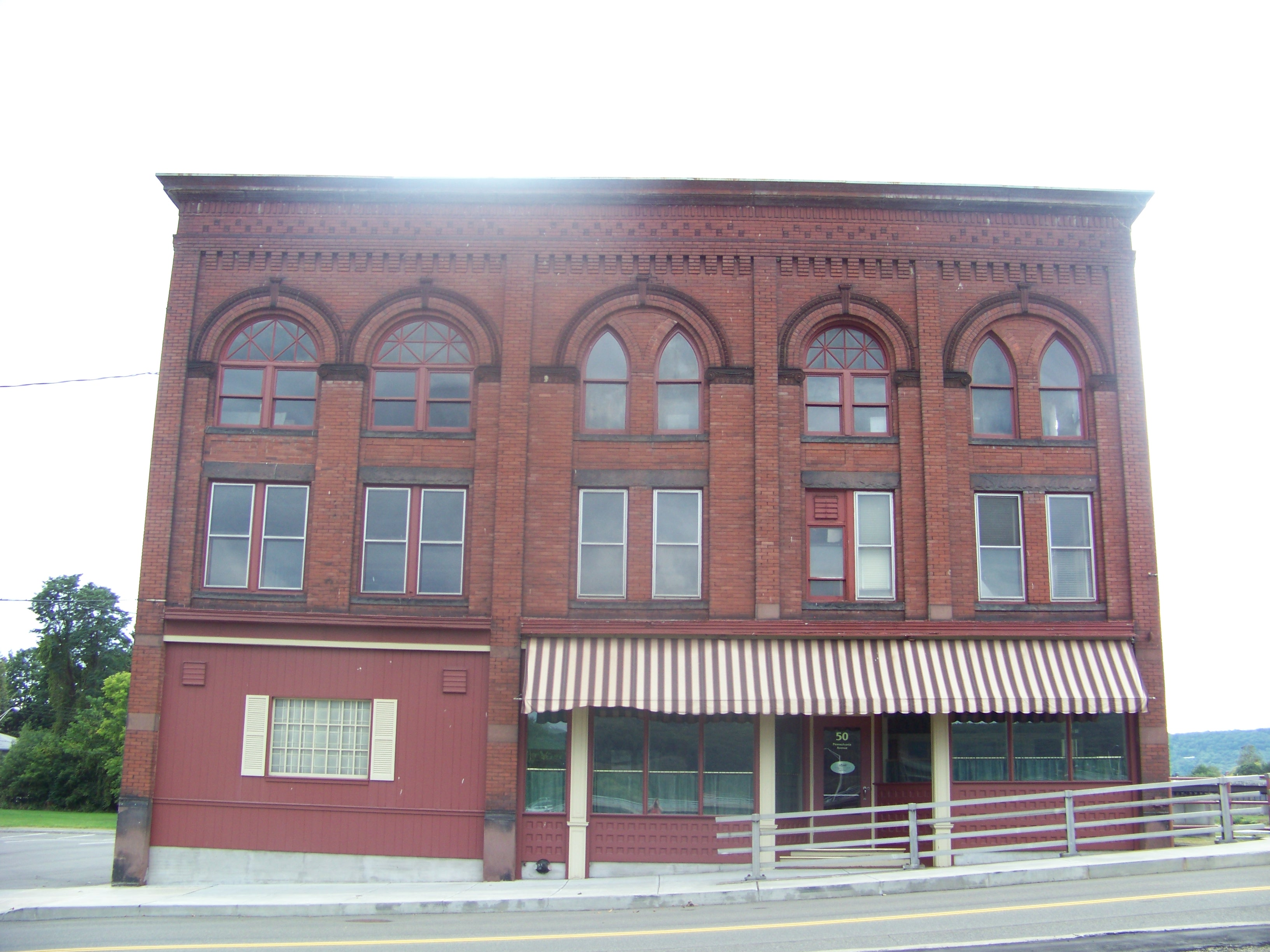
Brand Building, front facade

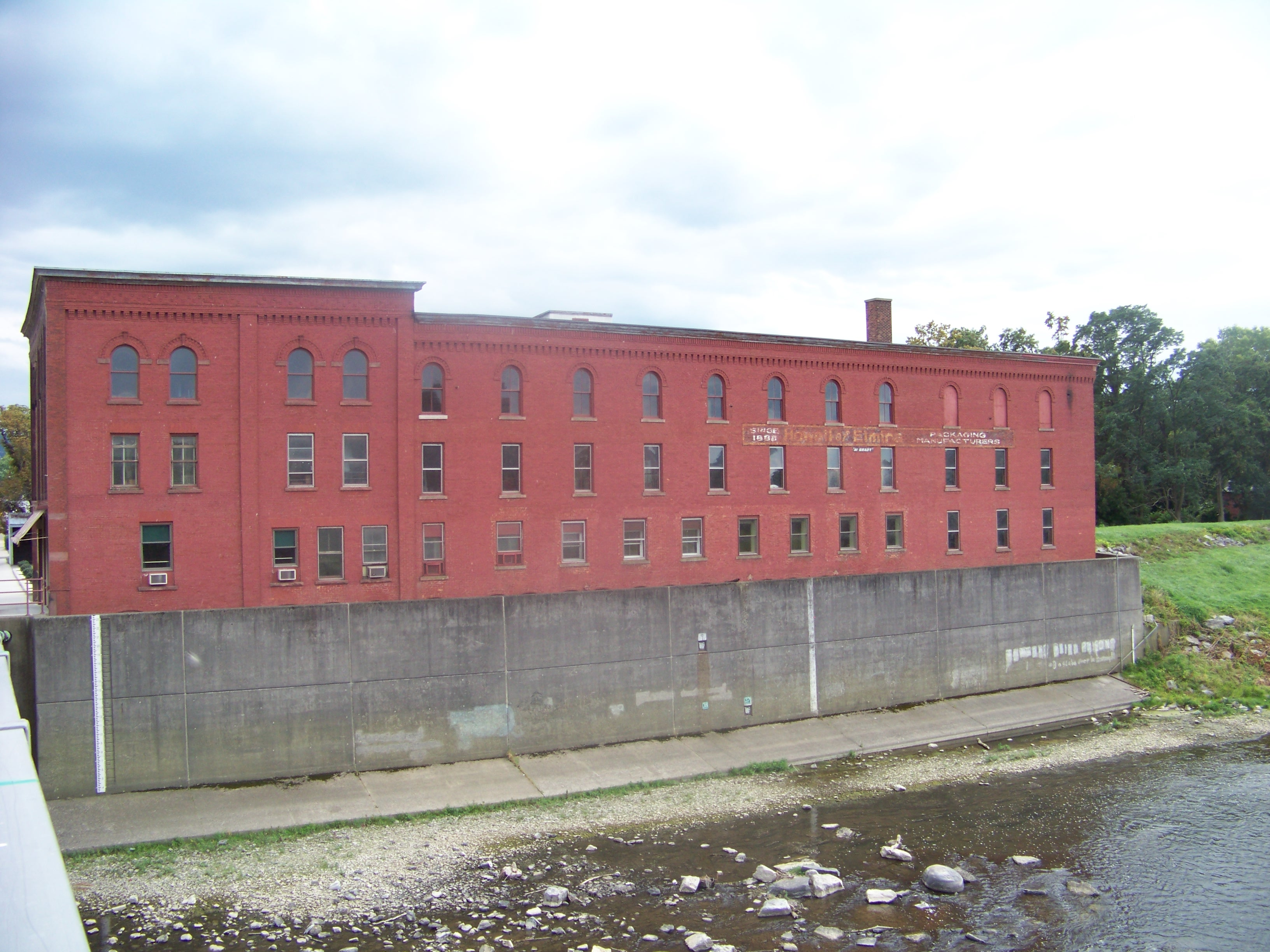
Brand Building, northern elevation

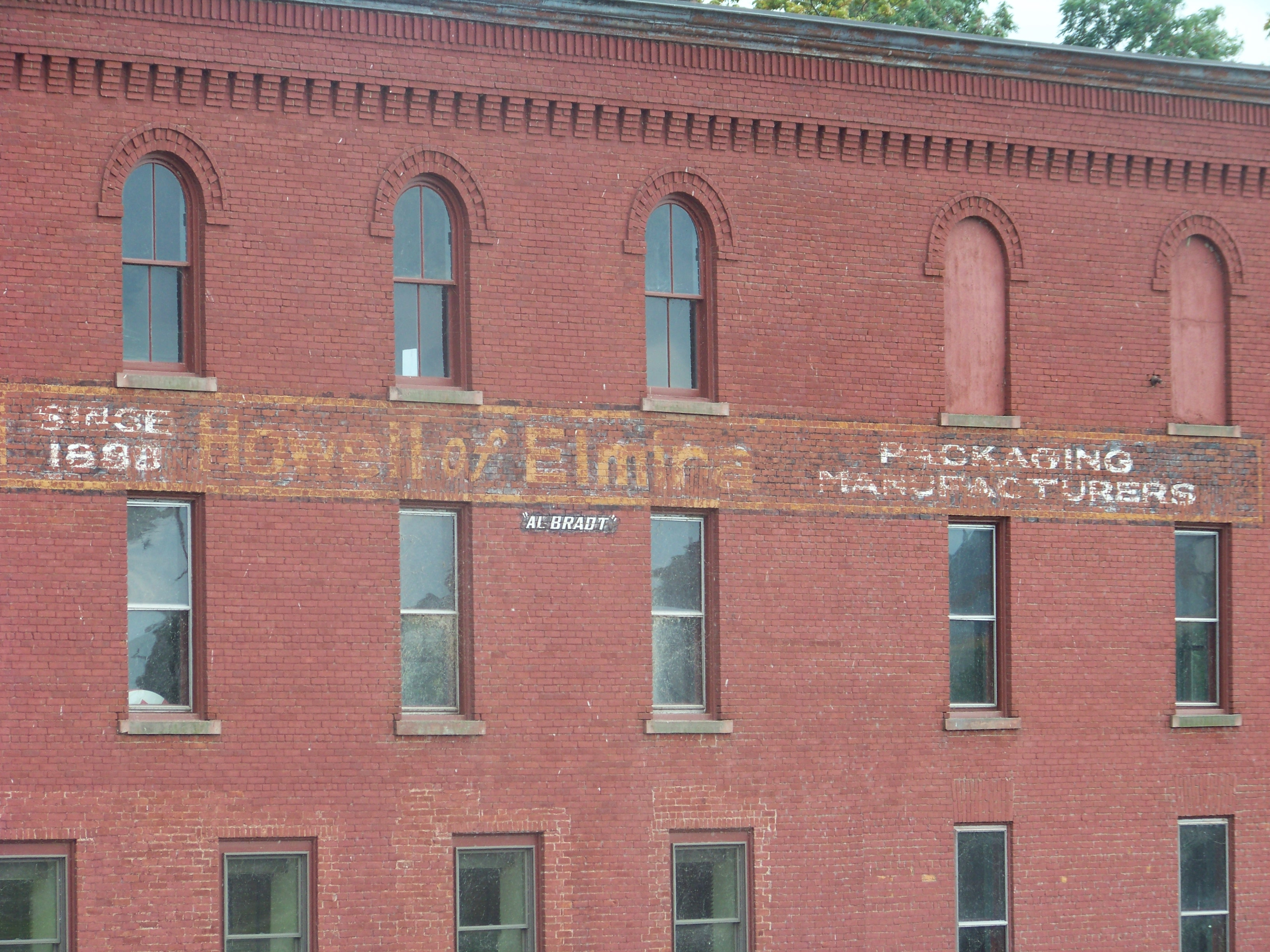
Signage detail on the northern elevation of the Brand Building

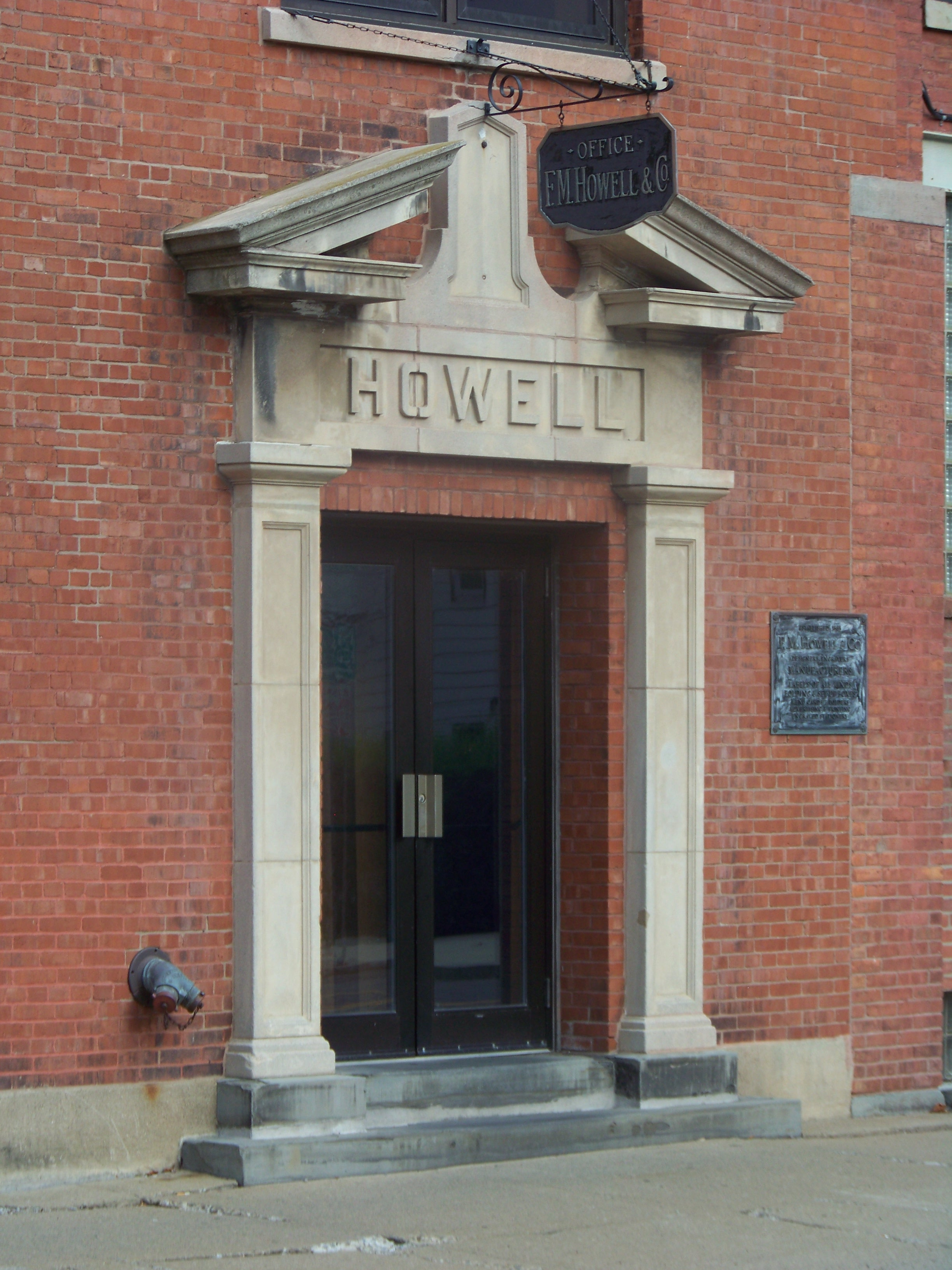
Entrance to Building 2

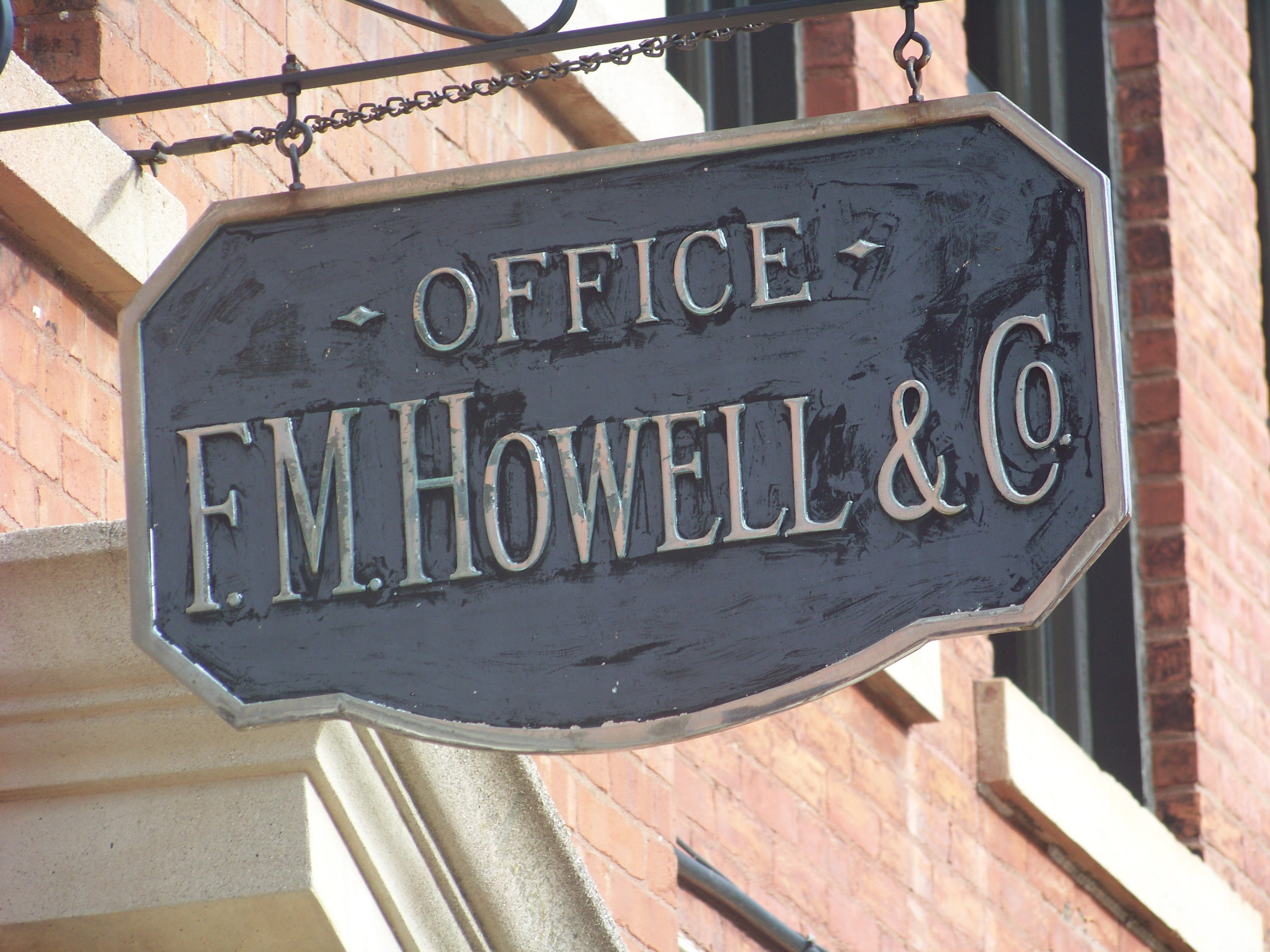
Sign above the entrance to Building 2
