= Parkhurst Memorial Presbyterian Church =

Historic church in Pennsylvania, United States

- U.S. National Register of Historic Places
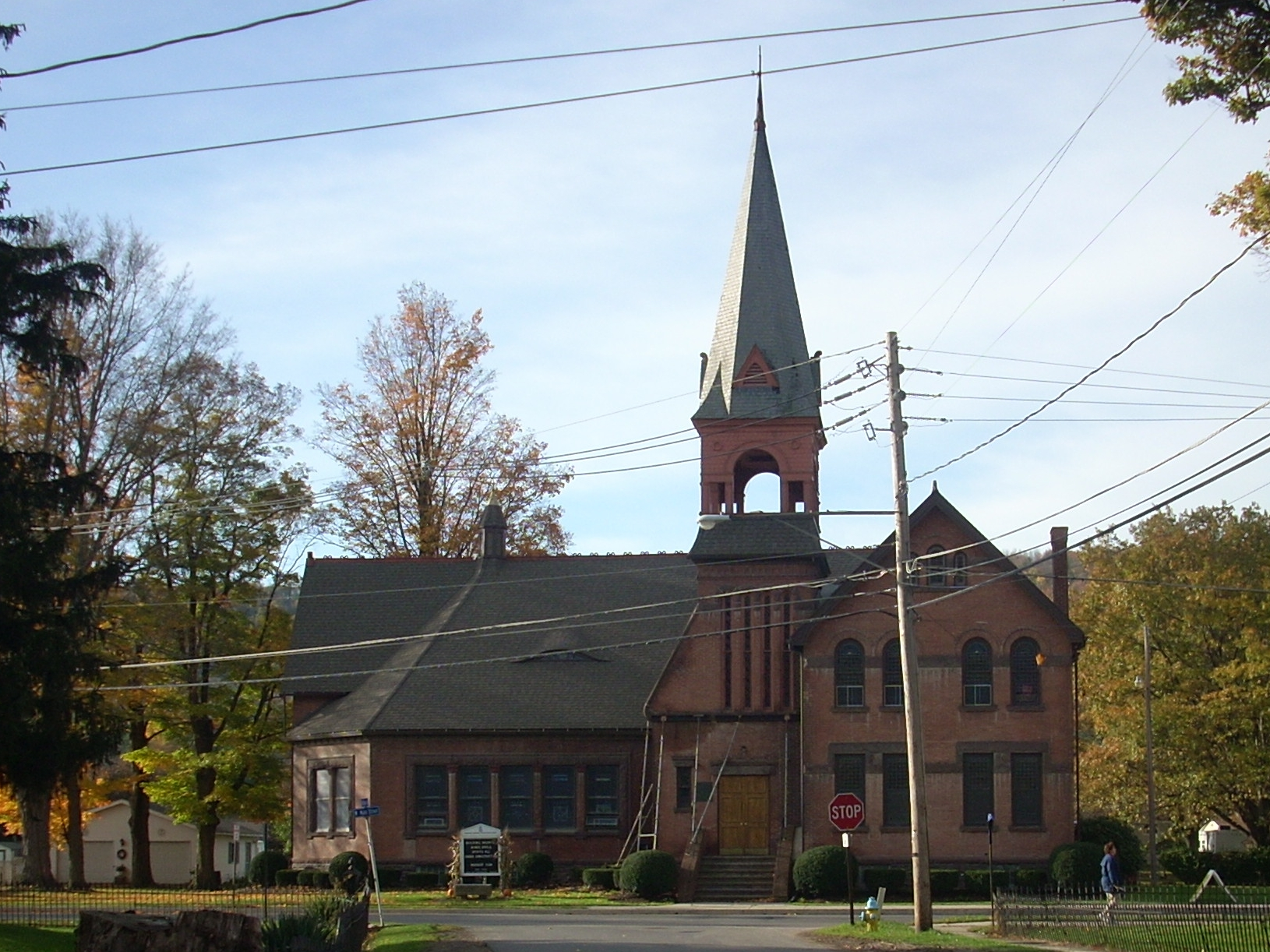
- The church in 2011

- Location within Pennsylvania Location within the United States
- Location: 302 W. Main St., Elkland, Pennsylvania
- Coordinates: 41°59′14″N 77°19′01″W
- Built: 1889
- Architect: Pierce & Dockstader
- Architectural style: Late Victorian Romanesque
- NRHP reference No.: 12000224
- Added to NRHP: April 16, 2012

The Parkhurst Memorial Presbyterian Church is an historic Presbyterian church that located in Elkland, Tioga County, Pennsylvania in the United States. It was built in 1889, and is a two-story, brick church structure that was designed in a Late Victorian Romanesque style.

== History and architectural features ==
This historic church building features a central tower at the entrance with belfry and tall steeple.

The Parkhurst Memorial Presbyterian Church of Elkland, Pennsylvania received its name from the Parkhurst family of the same borough. The church was built as a memorial to Joel Parkhurst who was a leading citizen of Elkland, having established a number of businesses there in 1828 that grew to such large proportion as to make him the leading merchant of the valley. His philanthropy and civic responsibility earned him the respect of the citizens of Elkland who mourned his passing at age 84 December 6, 1884. His three living children, Anna Pattison, Susan Grier and Benjamin Parkhurst agreed that the most fitting memorial to Joel's faith and good works would be the construction of a church and to this end approached architect Otis Dockstader of the Elmira firm of Pierce & Dockstader, to design and construct a church on the original site of the various edifices that had served the Presbyterian community of worshipers. The church was built and dedicated in 1890 as the Parkhurst Memorial Presbyterian Church.

It was added to the National Register of Historic Places in 2012.
