= First Baptist Church of Watkins Glen =

Historic church in New York, United States

- U.S. National Register of Historic Places
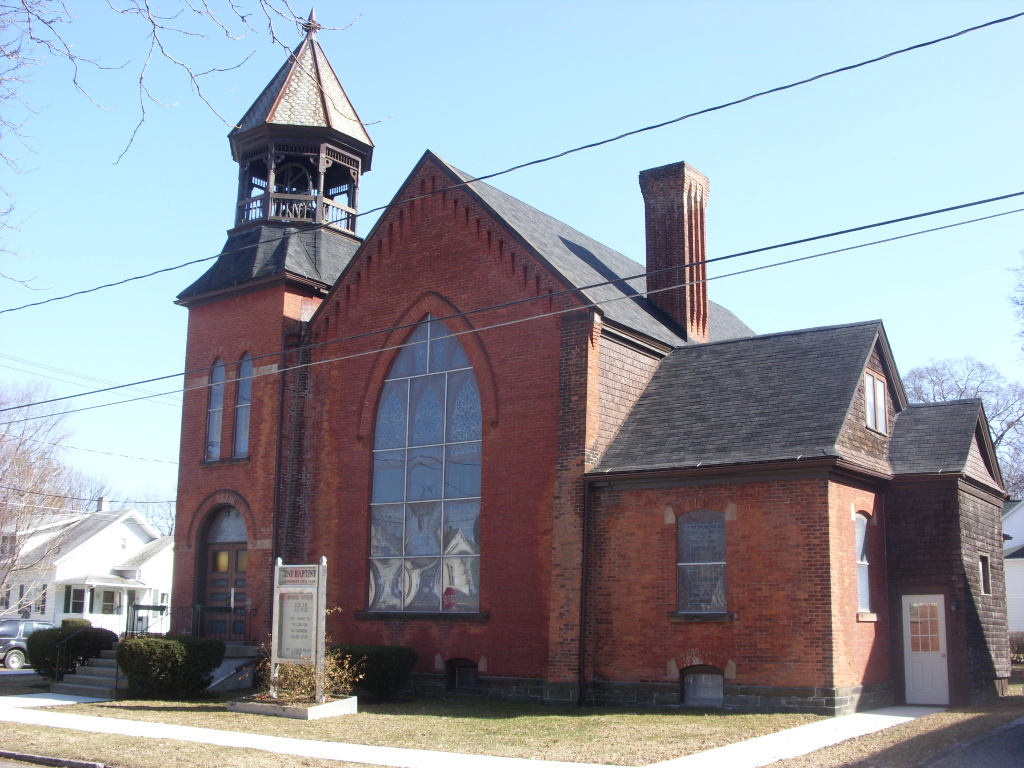
- First Baptist Church of Watkins Glen, March 2009

- Location within New York Location within the United States
- Location: Fifth St. and Porter St., Watkins Glen, New York
- Coordinates: 42°22′50″N 76°52′12″W
- Area: less than one acre
- Built: 1888
- Architect: Pierce & Dockstader
- Architectural style: Late Victorian
- NRHP reference No.: 01000996
- Added to NRHP: September 13, 2001

First Baptist Church of Watkins Glen is a historic Baptist church located at Watkins Glen in Schuyler County, New York. It was built in 1888 and is a Victorian era religious building distinguished by a variety of vernacular Romanesque Revival and Queen Anne style inspired design and decorative detail. The brick structure rests on a raised stone foundation and features a large front corner tower. The architects were Pierce & Dockstader of Elmira.

It was listed on the National Register of Historic Places in 2001.
