= Pierce & Bickford =

American architectural firm (1891-1932)

Practice information
- Partners: Joseph H. Pierce; Hiram H. Bickford; Robert T. Bickford
- Founders: Joseph H. Pierce; Hiram H. Bickford
- Founded: 1891
- Dissolved: 1932
- Location: Elmira, New York

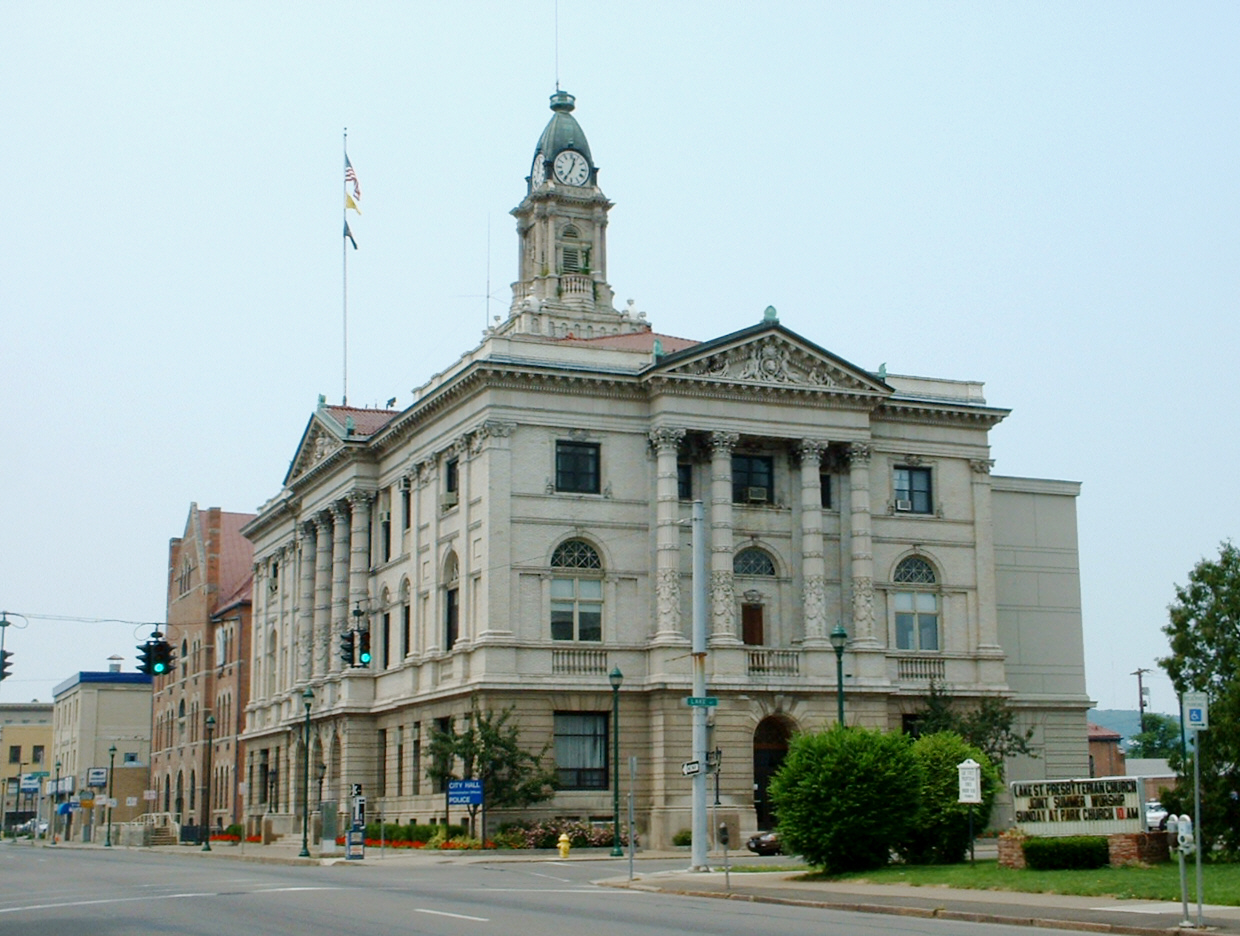
The Elmira City Hall, designed by Pierce & Bickford and completed in 1895.

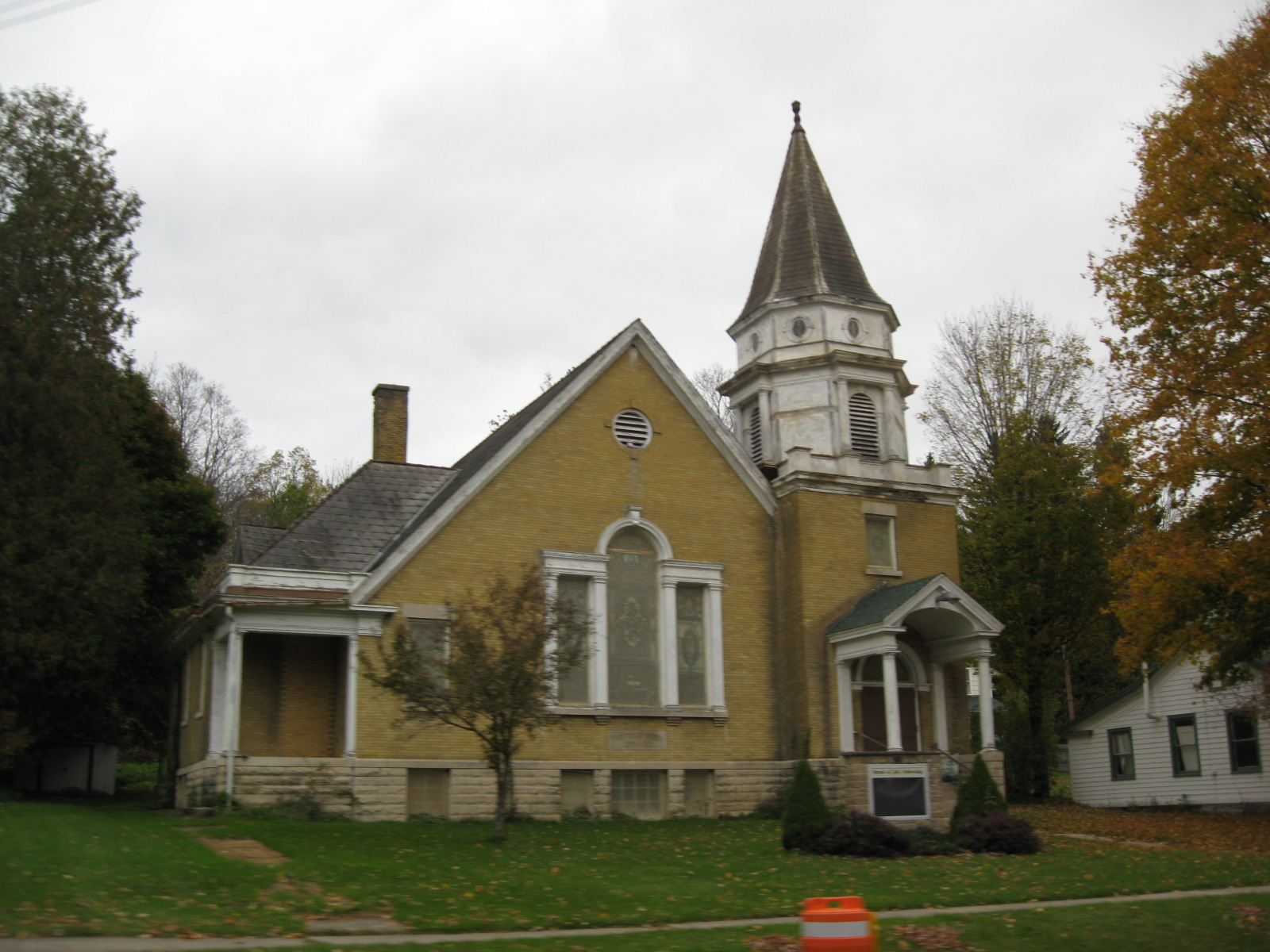
The Presbyterian Church of McGraw, built in 1901.

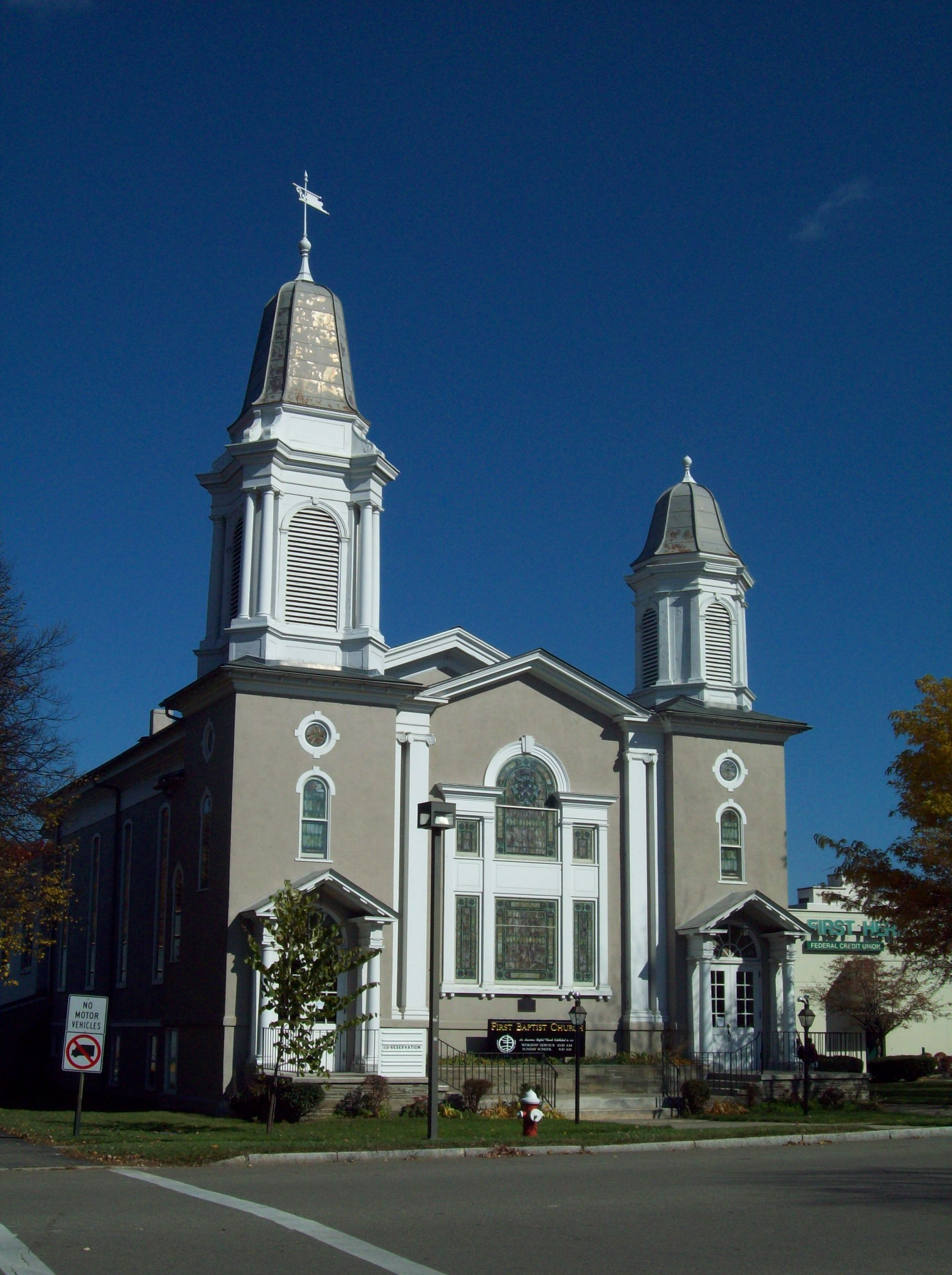
The First Baptist Church of Painted Post, originally built in 1860 and redesigned by Pierce & Bickford in 1915.

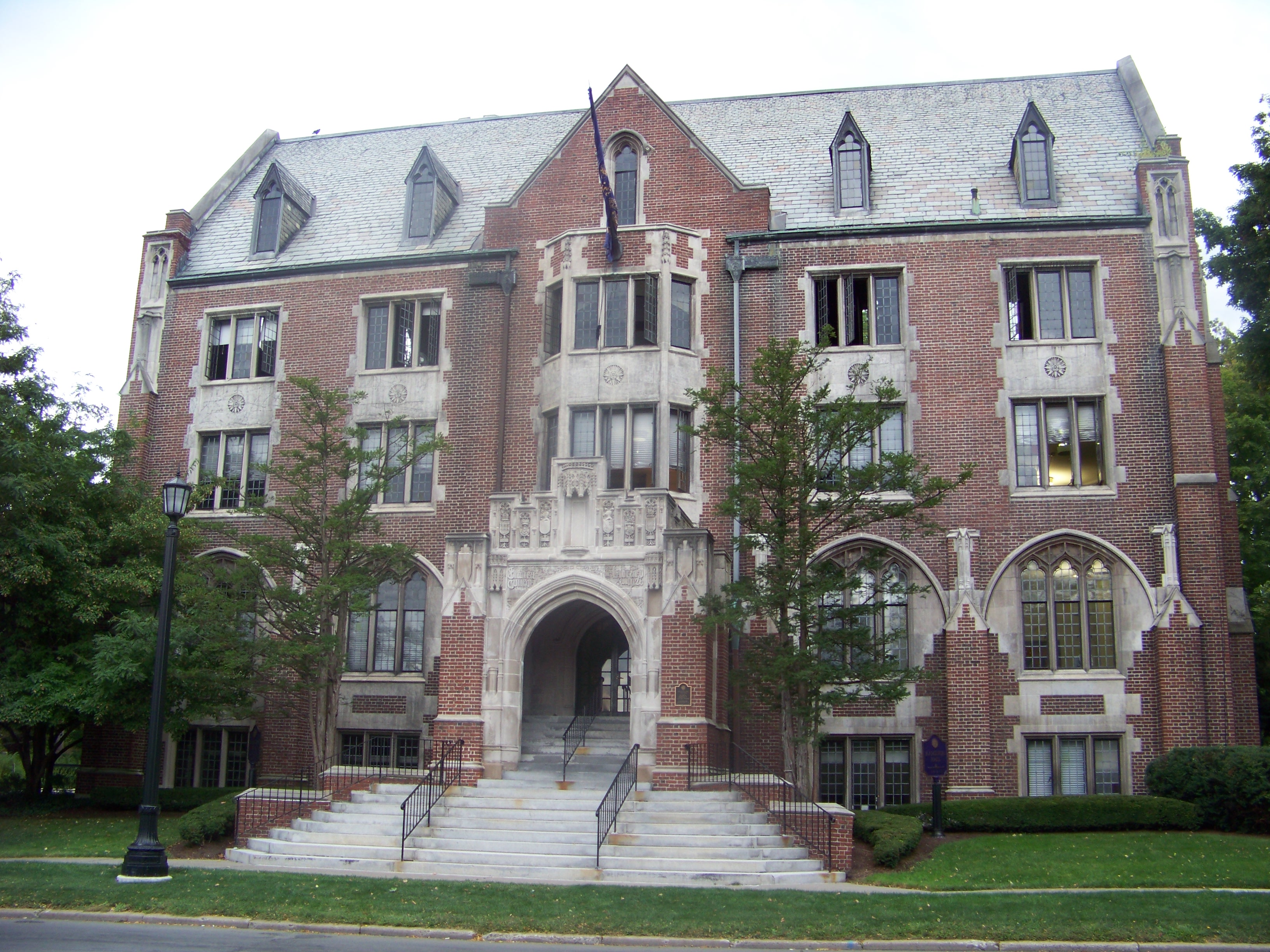
Hamilton Hall at Elmira College, designed by Pierce & Bickford in association with Coolidge, Shepley, Bulfinch & Abbott of Boston.

Pierce & Bickford was an American architectural firm active in Elmira, New York, from 1891 to 1932. It was formed as the partnership of architects of Joseph H. Pierce (1855-1932) and Hiram H. Bickford (1864-1929), with later partner Robert T. Bickford (1894-1988).

== Partners and history ==
Joseph Hart Pierce was born September 2, 1855, in Dundee, New York, to Herschel W. Pierce, a carpenter and builder, and Mariette (Pierce) Pierce. He attended the Dundee schools and the Starkey Seminary of Lakemont, New York, from which he graduated in 1878. After a period as a carpenter, in 1880 he moved to Elmira where he joined the office of architect Warren H. Hayes as a drafter. In 1881 Hayes relocated to Minneapolis, and Pierce purchased his Elmira practice. In 1884 he formed the firm of Pierce & Dockstader with Otis Dockstader as his partner. This was dissolved in 1890 over an ethics dispute between the partners. After an additional year of private practice, Pierce then formed the firm of Pierce & Bickford with Hiram H. Bickford.

Hiram Hooker Bickford was born November 22, 1864, in Barre, Vermont, to Daniel G. Bickford, also a carpenter and builder, and Cloe Marie (Hooker) Bickford. He was educated in the Barre Academy in Vermont before joining the office of Fitchburg, Massachusetts, architect Henry M. Francis as a student drafter. In 1887 he moved to Elmira and was hired as a drafter by Pierce & Dockstader, becoming Pierce's partner in 1891. In 1920 the partnership was expanded to include Bickford's son, Robert T. Bickford, as junior partner. The three became equal partners in 1925. The elder Bickford died November 8, 1929, with Pierce and the younger Bickford continuing in partnership. Pierce retired from the partnership effective January 1, 1932, and died August 28. Robert T. Bickford practiced architecture under his own name into the 1970s, and died in 1988.

Pierce joined the American Institute of Architects in 1889, followed by Bickford in 1893. Both served terms as president of the Central New York chapter.

== Legacy ==
A number of their works are listed on the United States National Register of Historic Places.

Pierce and Bickford were among the co-founders of the Chemung County Historical Society.

== Architectural works ==
=== Works by J. H. Pierce, 1881-1884 and 1890-1891 ===
- House, (Note: A contributing property to the Near Westside Historic District, NRHP-listed in 1983.) 456 W Water St, Elmira, New York (1883)
- Building No. 3 of F. M. Howell and Company, 79 Pennsylvania Ave, Elmira, New York (1890, NRHP 1984)
- Waverly Village Hall, 358 Broad St, Waverly, New York (1891–92, NRHP 2003)

=== Works by Pierce & Dockstader, 1884-1890 ===
- 30th Separate Company Armory, (Note: Formerly a contributing property to the Elmira Civic Historic District, NRHP-listed in 1980.) 307 E Church St, Elmira, New York (1886–88, demolished 2010)
- House for J. H. Pierce, (Note: Home of the architect. A contributing property to the Clinton–Columbia Historic District, NRHP-listed in 2015.) 308 W Clinton St, Elmira, New York (1887)
- First Baptist Church of Watkins Glen, 213 5th St, Watkins Glen, New York (1888, NRHP 2001)
- Jesse Robinson house, 141 Main St. Wellsboro, Pennsylvania (1888, NRHP 1991)
- First Congregational Church, 12445 NY-38, Berkshire, New York (1889, NRHP 1984)
- Parkhurst Memorial Presbyterian Church, 302 W Main St, Elkland, Pennsylvania (1889–90, NRHP 2012)
- House, 413 W Water St, Elmira, New York (1890)

=== Works by Pierce & Bickford, 1891-1932 ===
- Horseheads Union School, (Note: Formerly a contributing property to the Horseheads 1855 Extension Historic District, NRHP-listed in 1980.) Grand Central Ave and Fletcher St, Horseheads, New York (1891–92, demolished 1988)
- Clifton Springs Sanitarium, (Note: A contributing property to the Clifton Springs Sanitarium Historic District, NRHP-listed in 1990.) 9 and 11 E Main St Clifton Springs, New York (1892–93 and 1895–96, NRHP 1979)
- Justus H. Harris house, (Note: A contributing property to the Maple Avenue Historic District, NRHP-listed in 2013.) 361 Maple Ave, Elmira, New York (1892)
- Prouty Building, (Note: A contributing property to the Geneva Downtown Commercial Historic District, NRHP-listed in 2014.) 20-24 Seneca St, Geneva, New York (1892)
- St. Patrick's R. C. School, (Note: A contributing property to St. Patrick's Parochial Residence-Convent and School, NRHP-listed in 1992.) 517 Park Pl. Elmira, NY (1892–94)
- Bigelow Block, (Note: A contributing property to the Dundee Village Historic District, NRHP-listed in 2007.) 17 Main St, Dundee, New York (1894)
- Elmira City Hall, (Note: A contributing property to the Elmira Civic Historic District, NRHP-listed in 1980.) 317 E Church St, Elmira, New York (1894–95)
- Harpending Block, 11-15 Main St, Dundee, New York (1894)
- House, 619-621 W Water St, Elmira, New York (1894)
- Smith's Opera House, 82 Seneca St, Geneva, New York (1894, NRHP 1979)
- YMCA Building, Geneva, New York (1894)
- Steele Memorial Library, Lake and E Market Sts, Elmira, New York (1895, demolished)
- Elmira Heights Village Hall, 268 E 14th St, Elmira Heights, New York (1896, NRHP 1982)
- House, 530 W Water St, Elmira, New York (1896)
- T. DeWitt Beekman house, 39 Main St, Dundee, New York (1897)
- Corning City Club (former), (Note: Later the World War Memorial Library.) 149 Pine St, Corning, New York (1897, NRHP 1995)
- Fire Station No. 4, 301 Maxwell Pl, Elmira, New York (1897, NRHP 1988)
- House, 378 W Church St, Elmira, New York (1898)
- Brownlow Building, 406 E Church St, Elmira, New York (1899)
- Dundee Methodist Church, 33 Water St, Dundee, New York (1899-1902, NRHP 2005)
- Hedding Methodist Church (former), 330 W Church St, Elmira, New York (1901)
- Presbyterian Church of McGraw, 3 W Main St, McGraw, New York (1901, NRHP 2002)
- A. F. Chapman house turret addition, 115 S Monroe St, Watkins Glen, New York (1902, NRHP 1997)
- Chemung Canal Bank Building alterations, 415 E Water St, Elmira, New York (1903, NRHP 1978)
- Chapel (former), Woodlawn Cemetery, Elmira, New York (1905)
- Century Club (former), 214 E Church St, Elmira, New York (1906–07)
- House, 421 W Church St, Elmira, New York (1906)
- Steuben County Courthouse (format), 12 Allen St, Hornell, New York (1907–08)
- Sayre Borough Hall, 110 W Packer Ave, Sayre, Pennsylvania (1908)
- Trinity Episcopal Church parsonage, (Note: A contributing property to the Athens Historic District, NRHP-listed in 2004.) 701 S Main St, Athens, Pennsylvania (1910)
- Arnot Art Museum conversion, 235 Lake St, Elmira, New York (1911–12)
- Carnegie Hall, (Note: As supervising architects for Edward L. Tilton of New York City.) (Note: A contributing property to the Elmira College Old Campus, NRHP-listed in 1984.) Elmira College, Elmira, New York (1911)
- House, 354 W Water St, Elmira, New York (1912)
- Elmira Free Academy (former), 610 Lake St, Elmira, New York (1913)
- Masonic Lodge and Opera House (former), 22 Water St, Dundee, New York (1913)
- First Baptist Church of Painted Post remodeling, 130 W Water St, Painted Post, New York (1915, NRHP 1999)
- Fassett Commons, Elmira College, Elmira, New York (1917)
- Erwin Town Hall (former), 117 W Water St, Painted Post, New York (1921)
- Iszard's Department Store, (Note: A contributing property to the North Main and West Water Commercial Historic District, NRHP-listed in 2016.) 150 N Main St, Elmira, New York (1924)
- Southside High School, 777 S Main St, Elmira, New York (1924)
- YMCA Building (former), 201 E Church St, Elmira, New York (1924)
- Hamilton Hall, (Note: As supervising architects for Coolidge, Shepley, Bulfinch & Abbott of Boston.) Elmira College, Elmira, New York (1926)
- Tompkins Hall, Elmira College, Elmira, New York (1927)
- Gordon Coy Building, (Note: As supervising architects for Robert D. Kohn of New York City.) 100 N Main St, Elmira, New York (1929–31)

== Gallery of architectural works ==
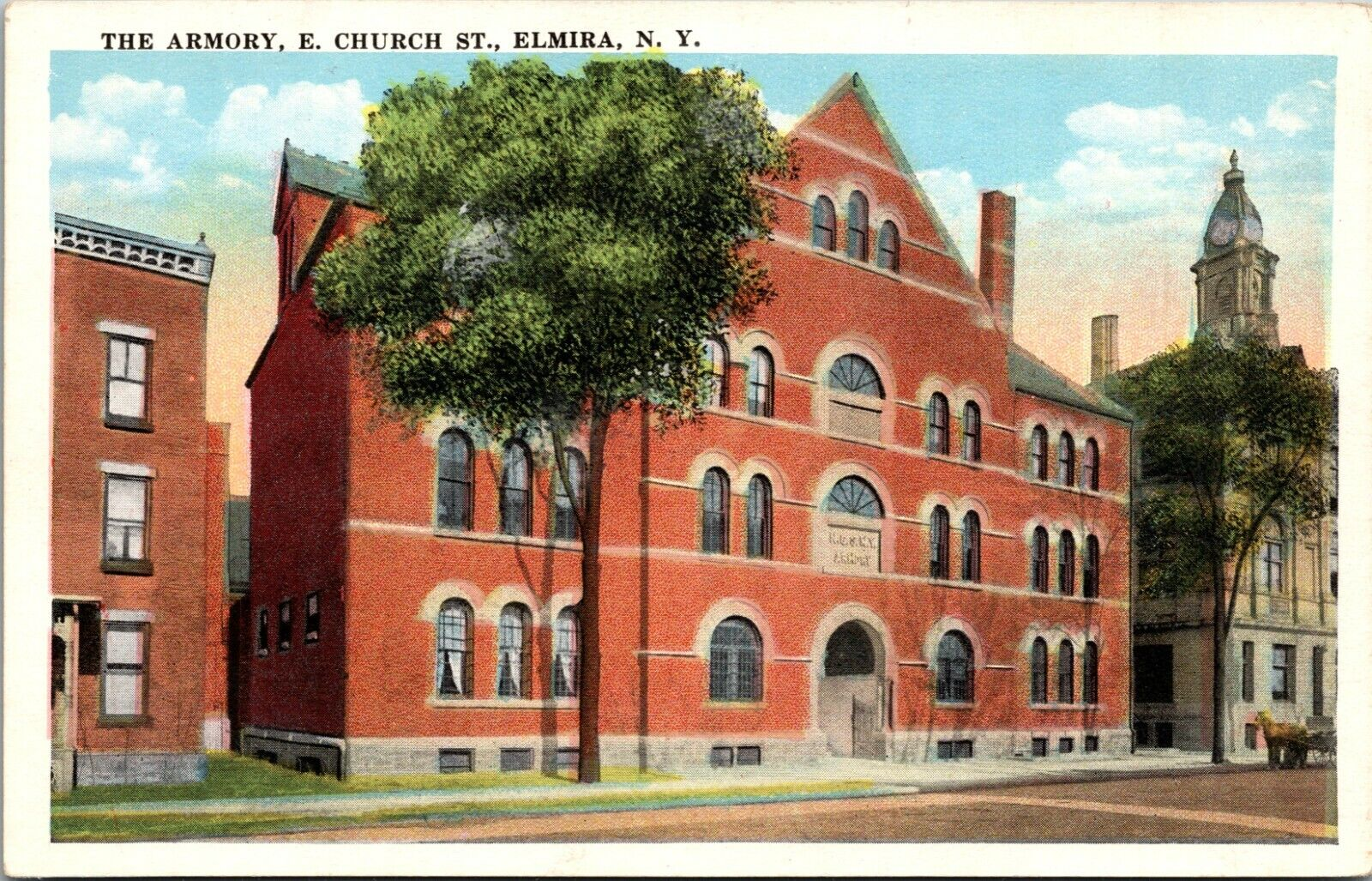
30th Separate Company Armory, Elmira, New York, 1886-88.

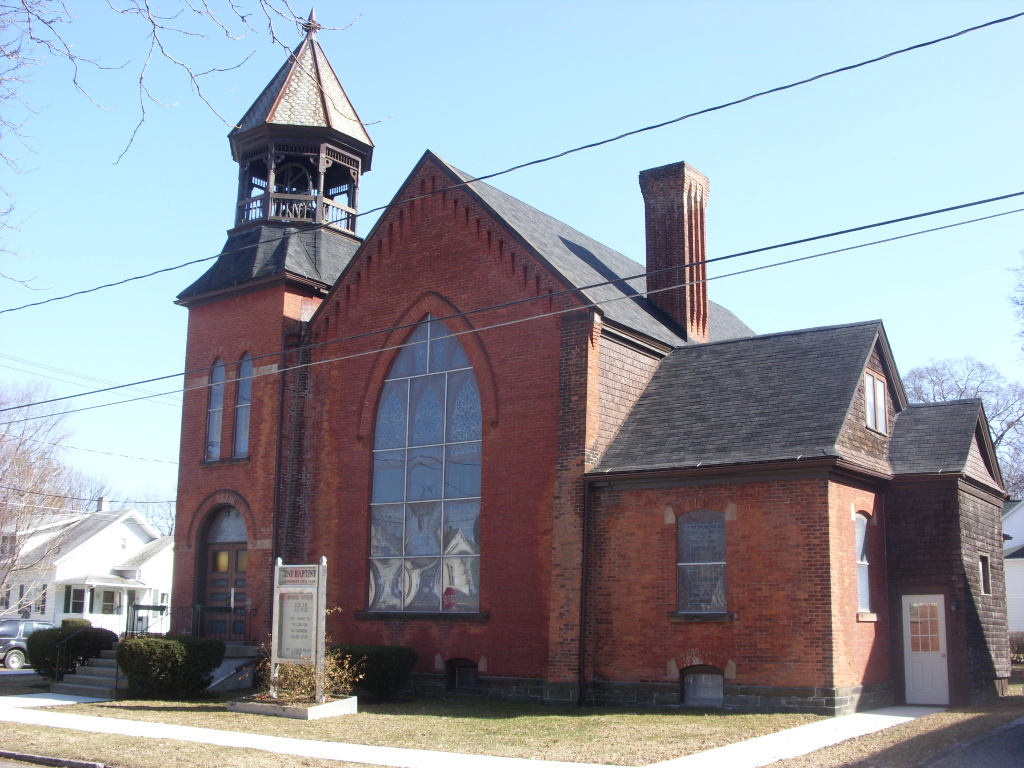
First Baptist Church of Watkins Glen, Watkins Glen, New York, 1888.

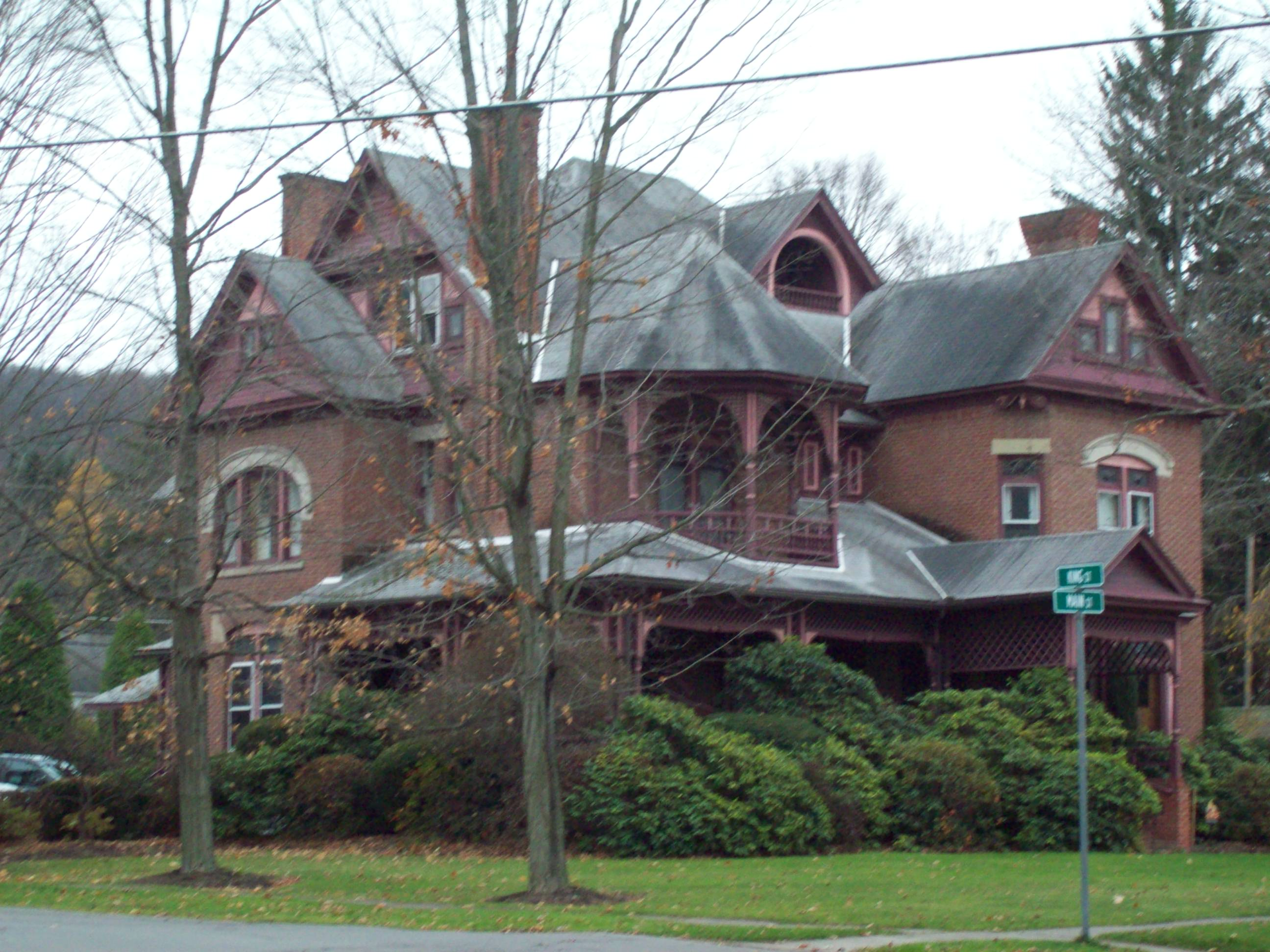
Jesse Robinson house, Wellsboro, Pennsylvania, 1888.

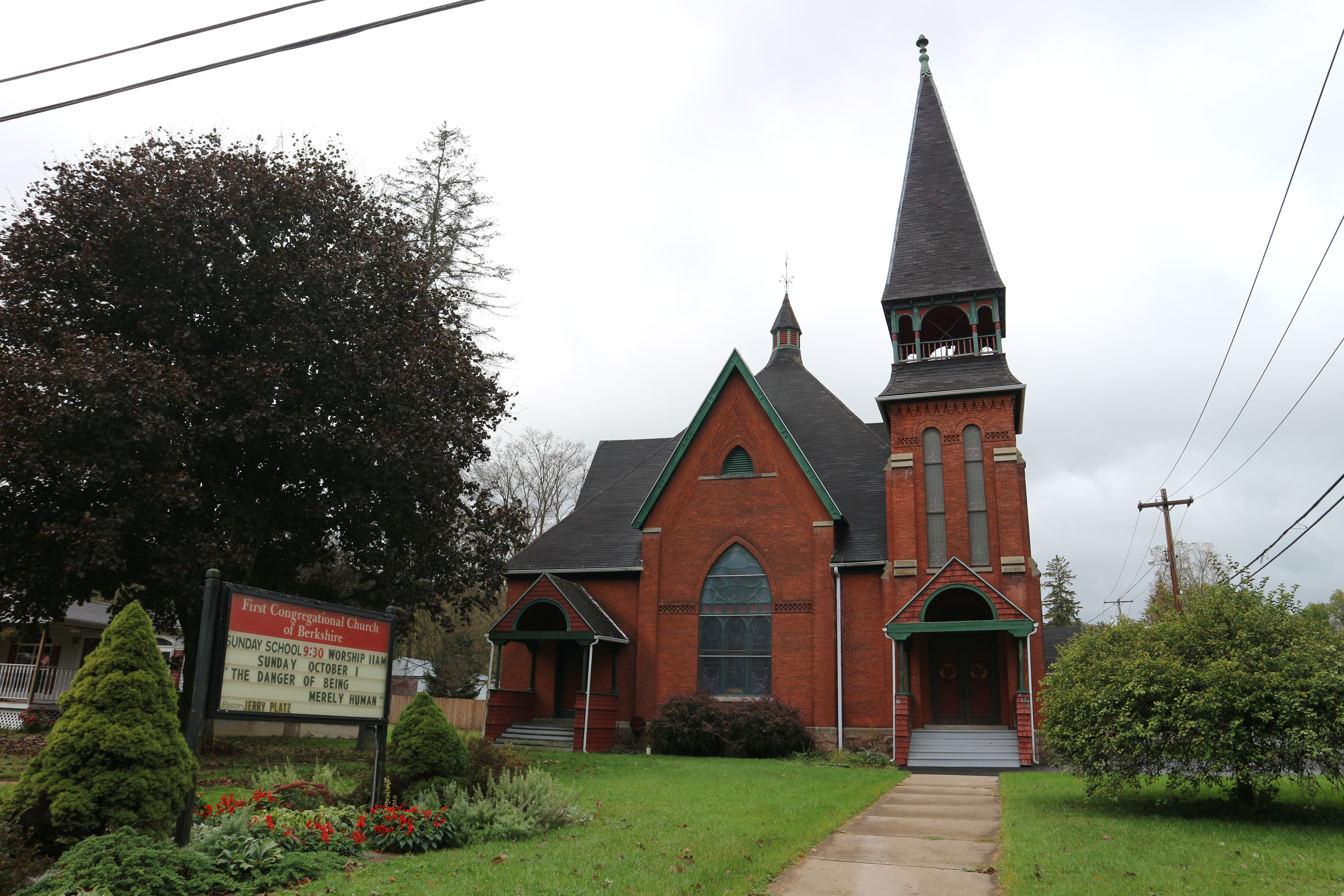
First Congregational Church, Berkshire, New York, 1889.

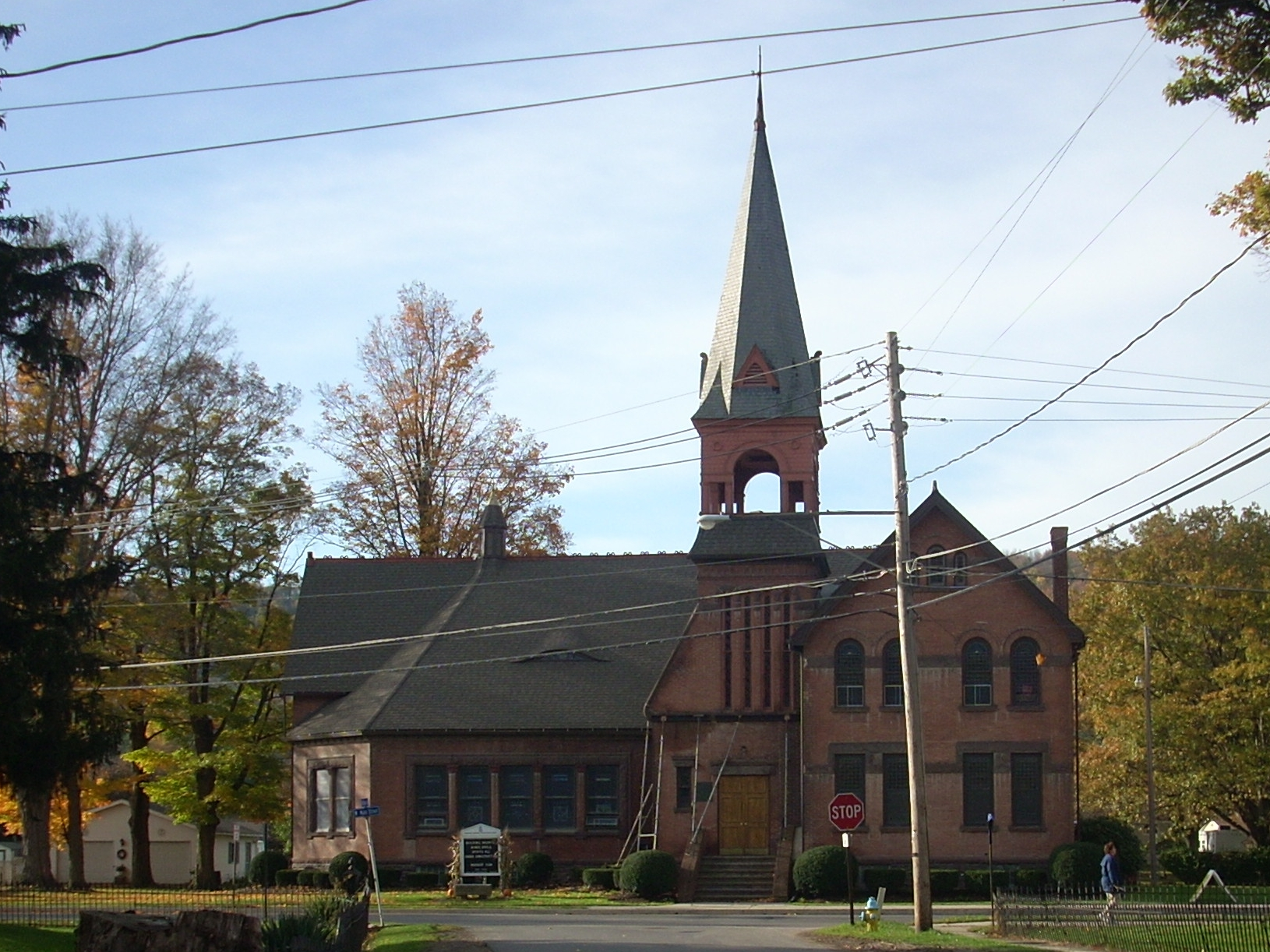
Parkhurst Memorial Presbyterian Church, Elkland, Pennsylvania, 1889-90.

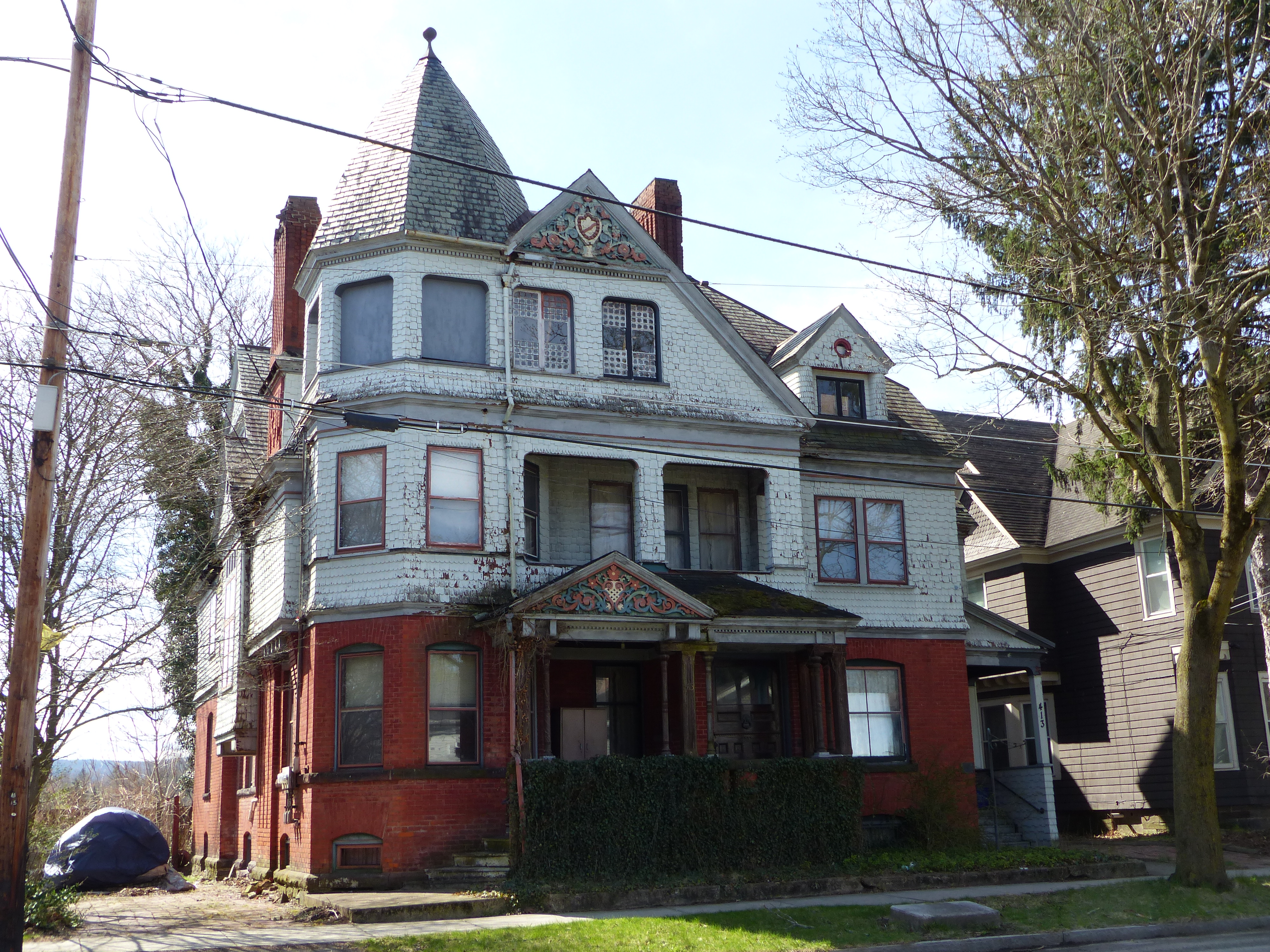
House, Elmira, New York, 1890.

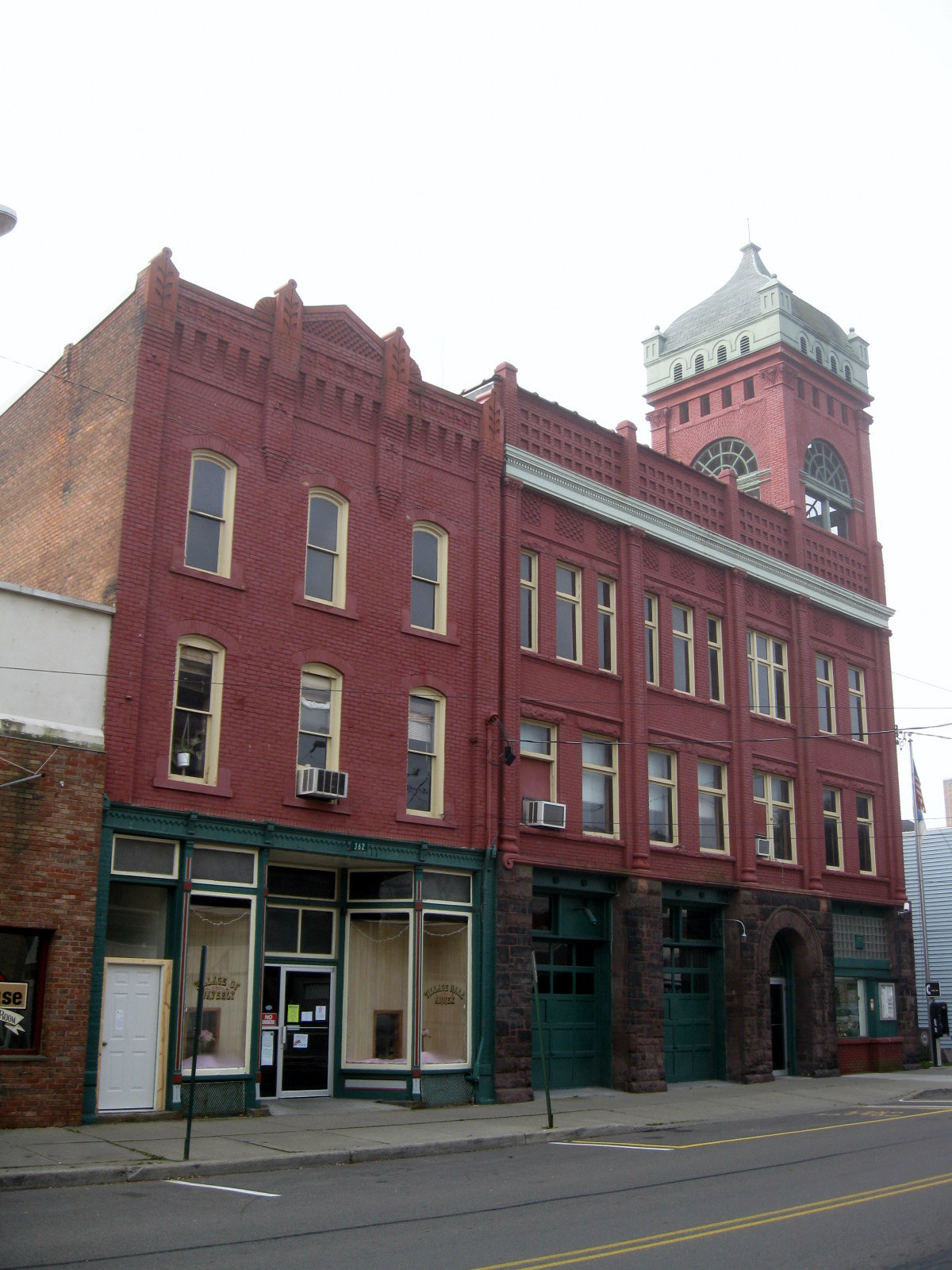
Waverly Village Hall, Waverly, New York, 1891-92.

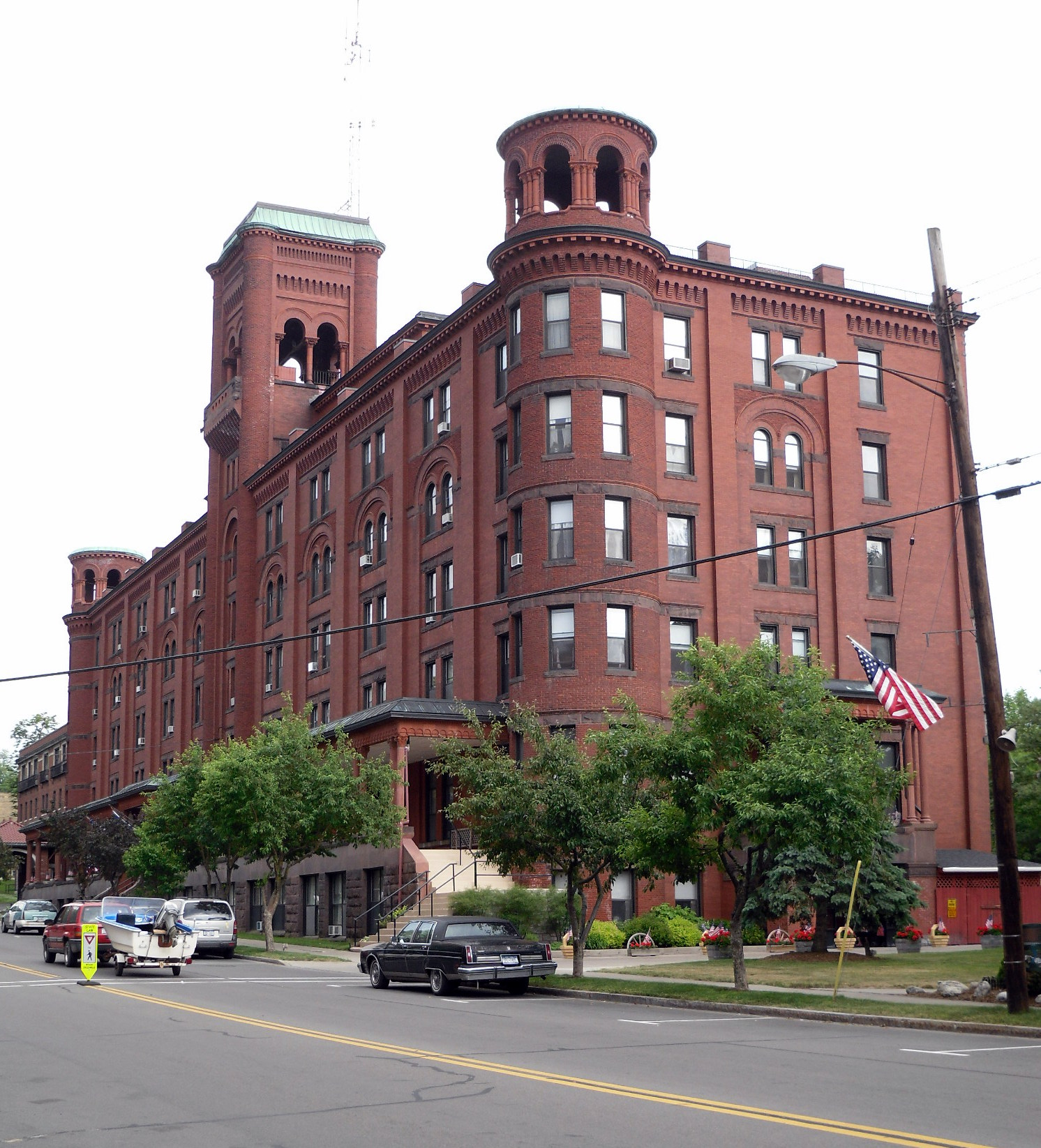
Clifton Springs Sanitarium, Clifton Springs, New York, 1892-93 and 1895-96.

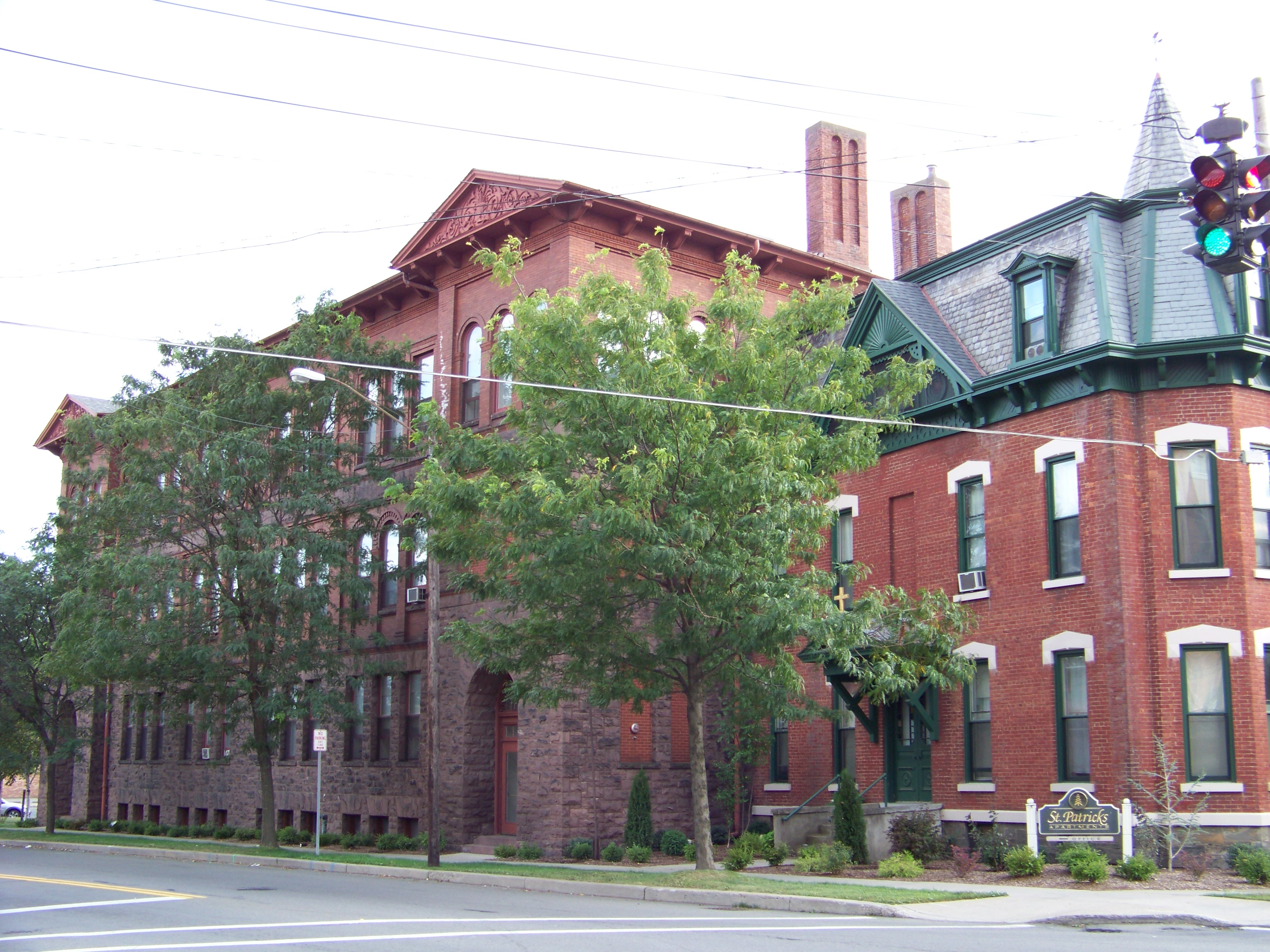
St. Patrick's R. C. School, Elmira, New York, 1892-94.

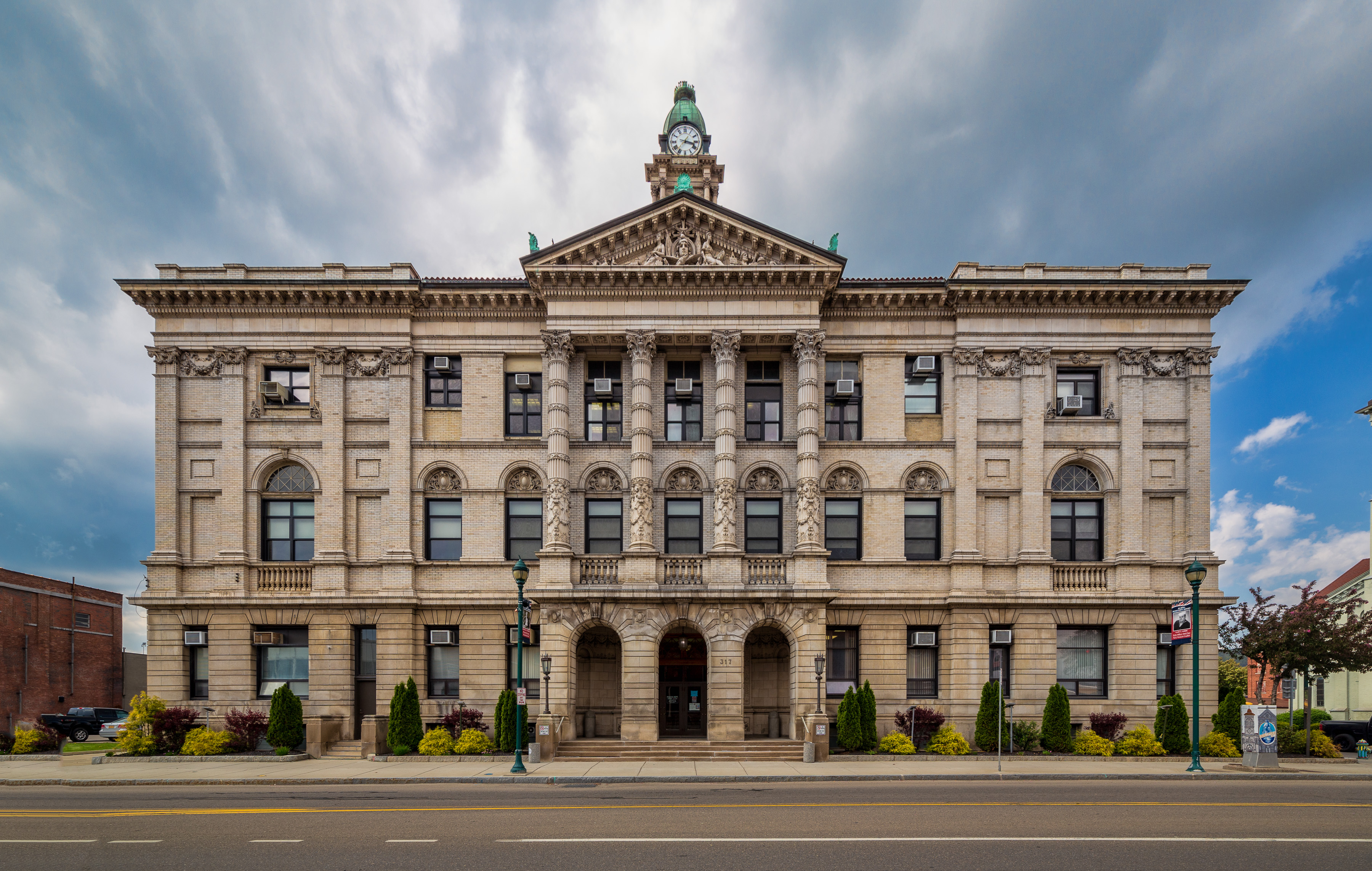
Elmira City Hall, Elmira, New York, 1894-95.

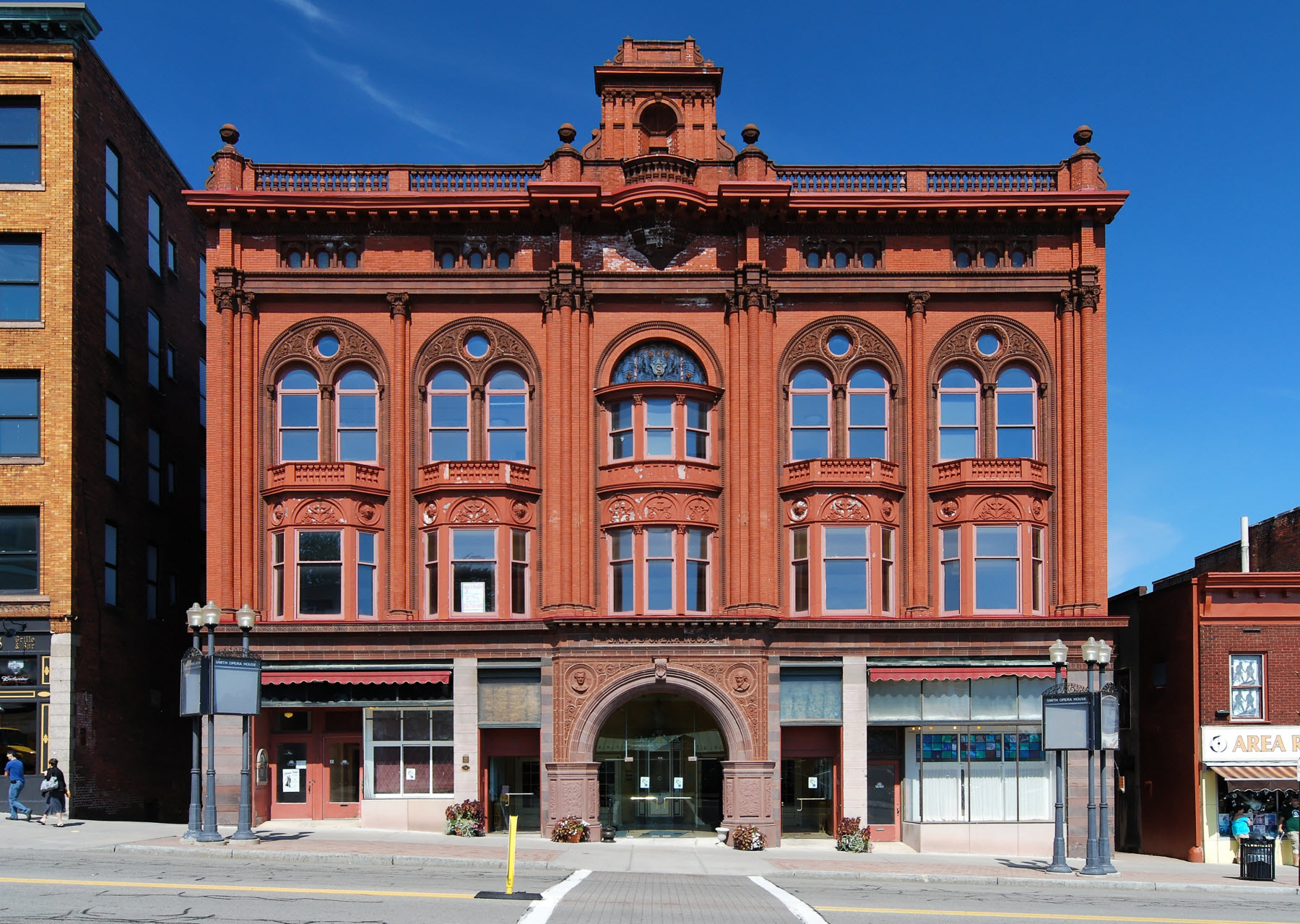
Smith's Opera House, Geneva, New York, 1894.

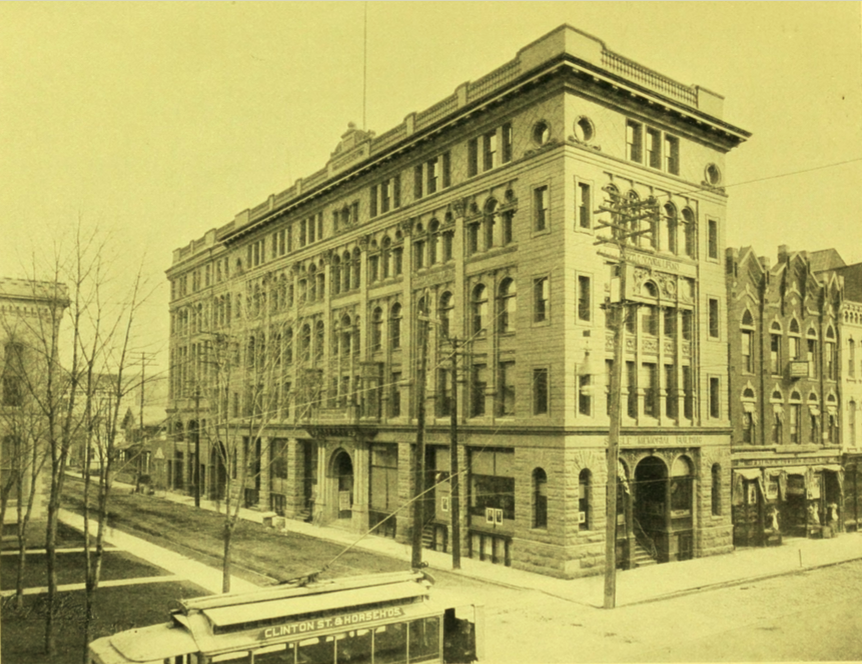
Steele Memorial Library, Elmira, New York, 1895.

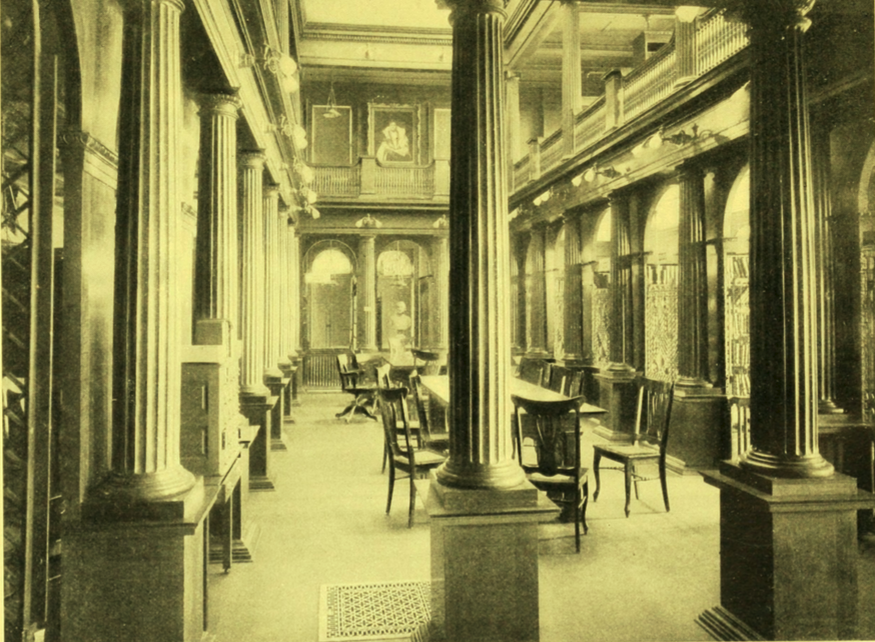
Interior view of the Steele Memorial Library, Elmira, New York, 1895.

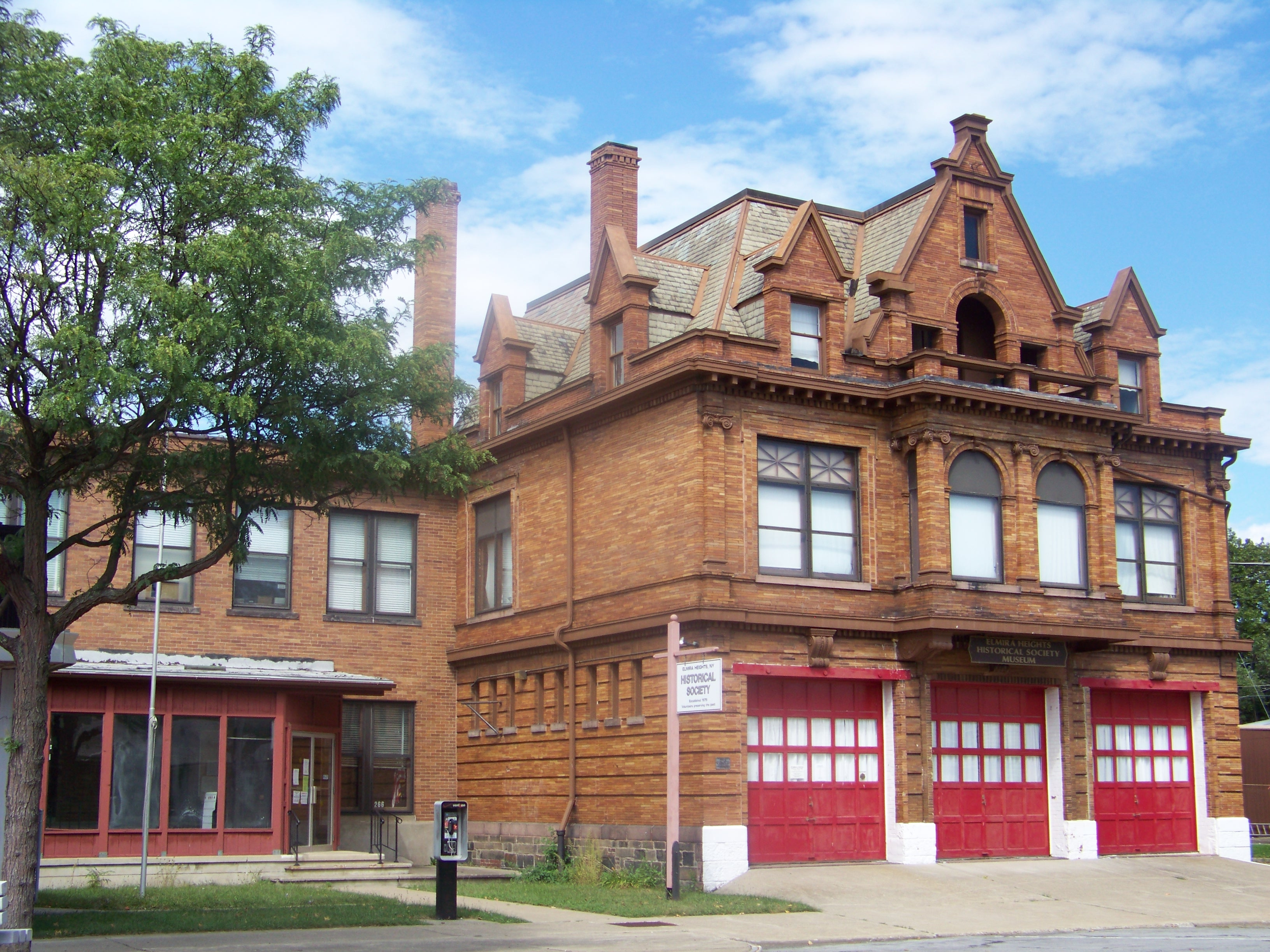
Elmira Heights Village Hall, Elmira Heights, New York, 1896.

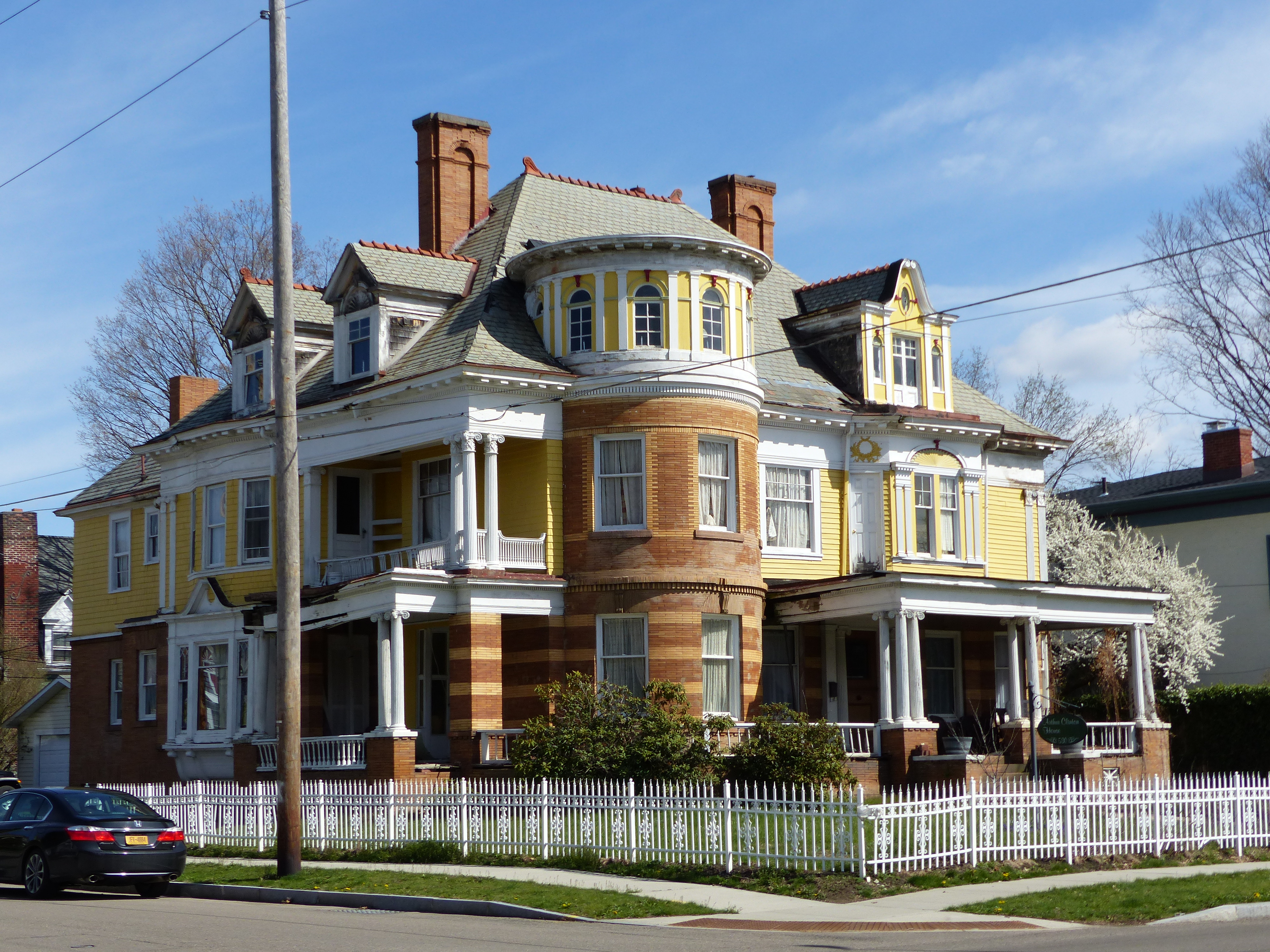
House, Elmira, New York, 1896.

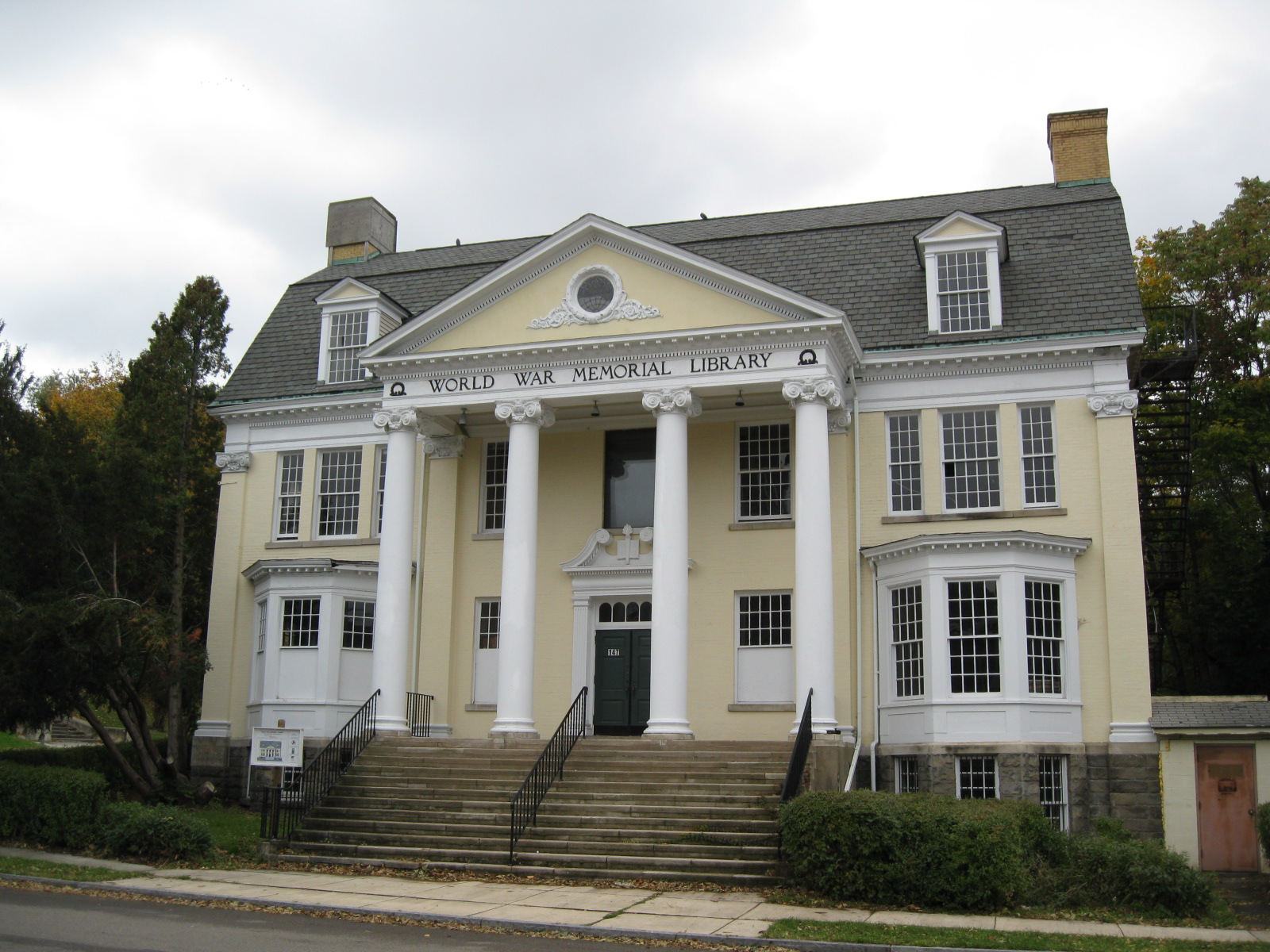
Corning City Club, Corning, New York, 1897.

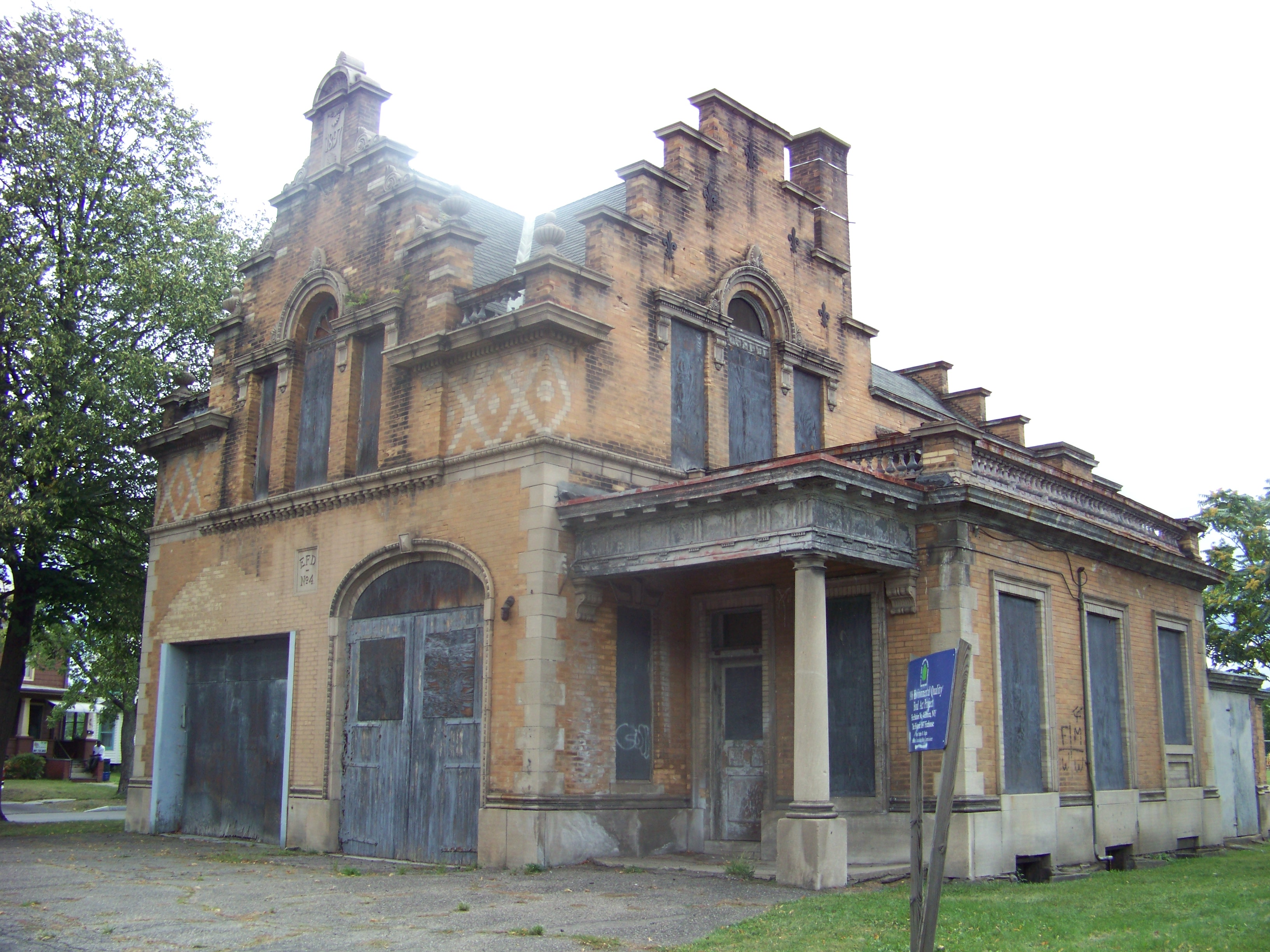
Fire Station No. 4, Elmira, New York, 1897.

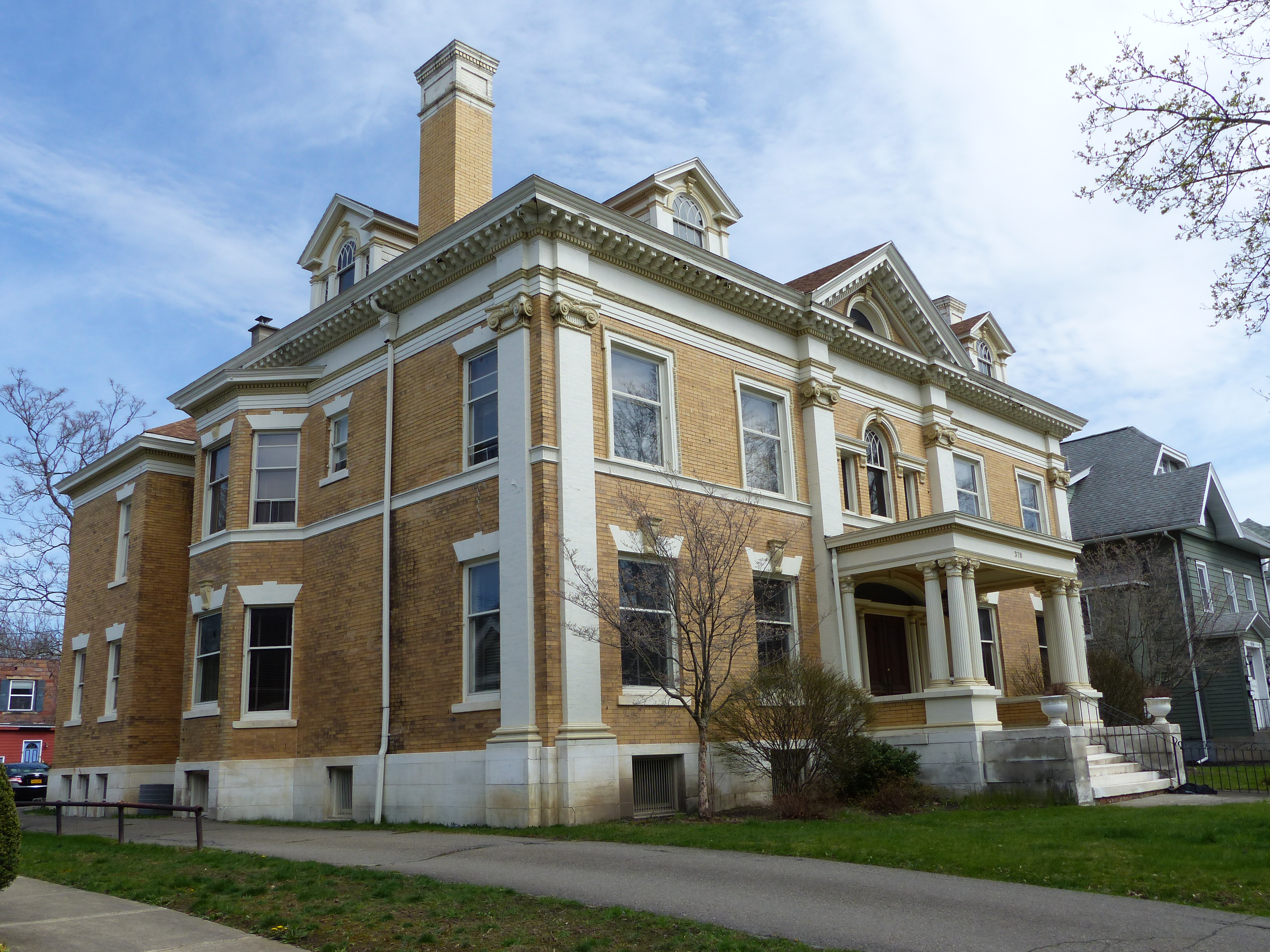
House, Elmira, New York, 1898.

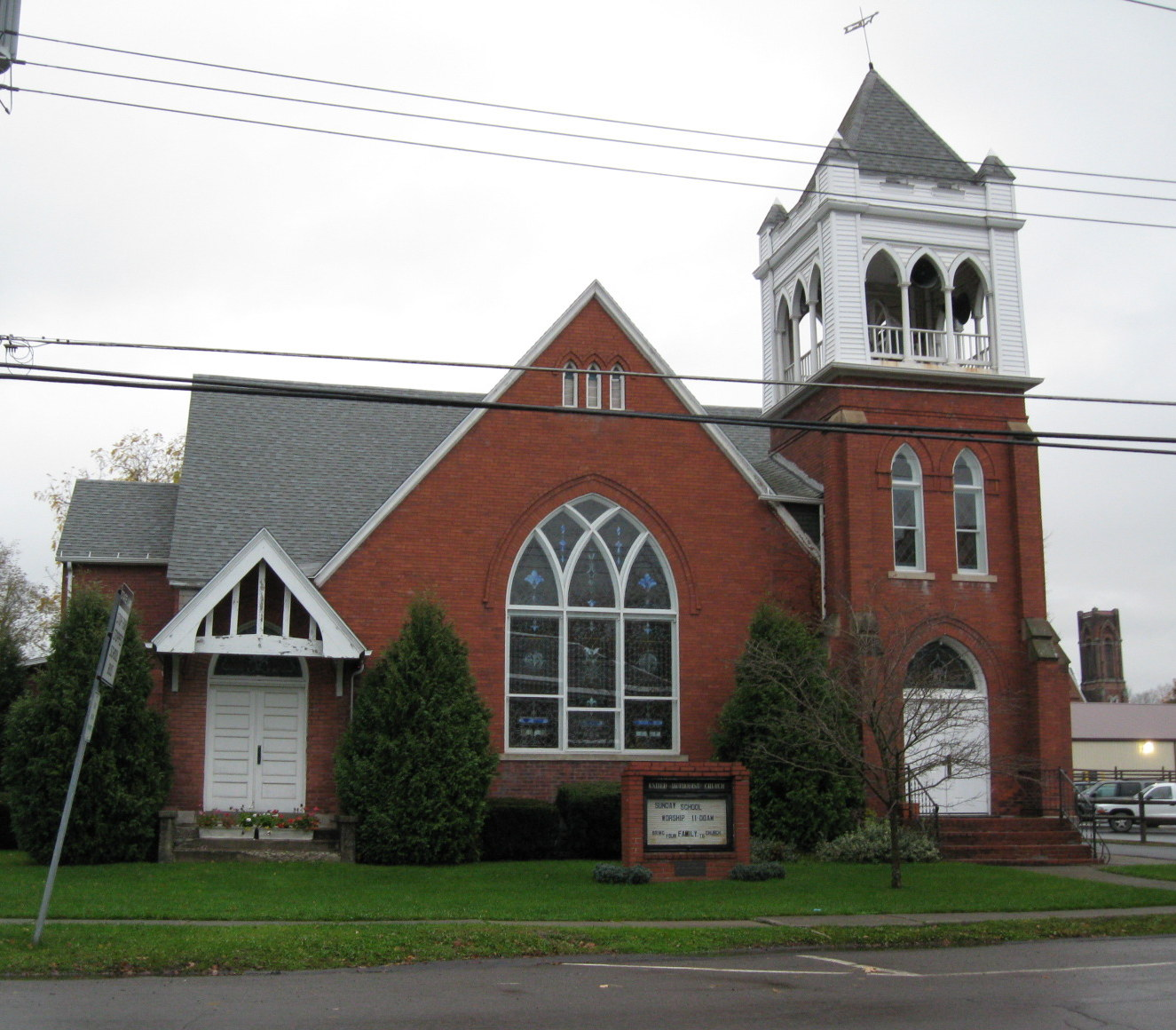
Dundee Methodist Church, Dundee, New York, 1899-1901.

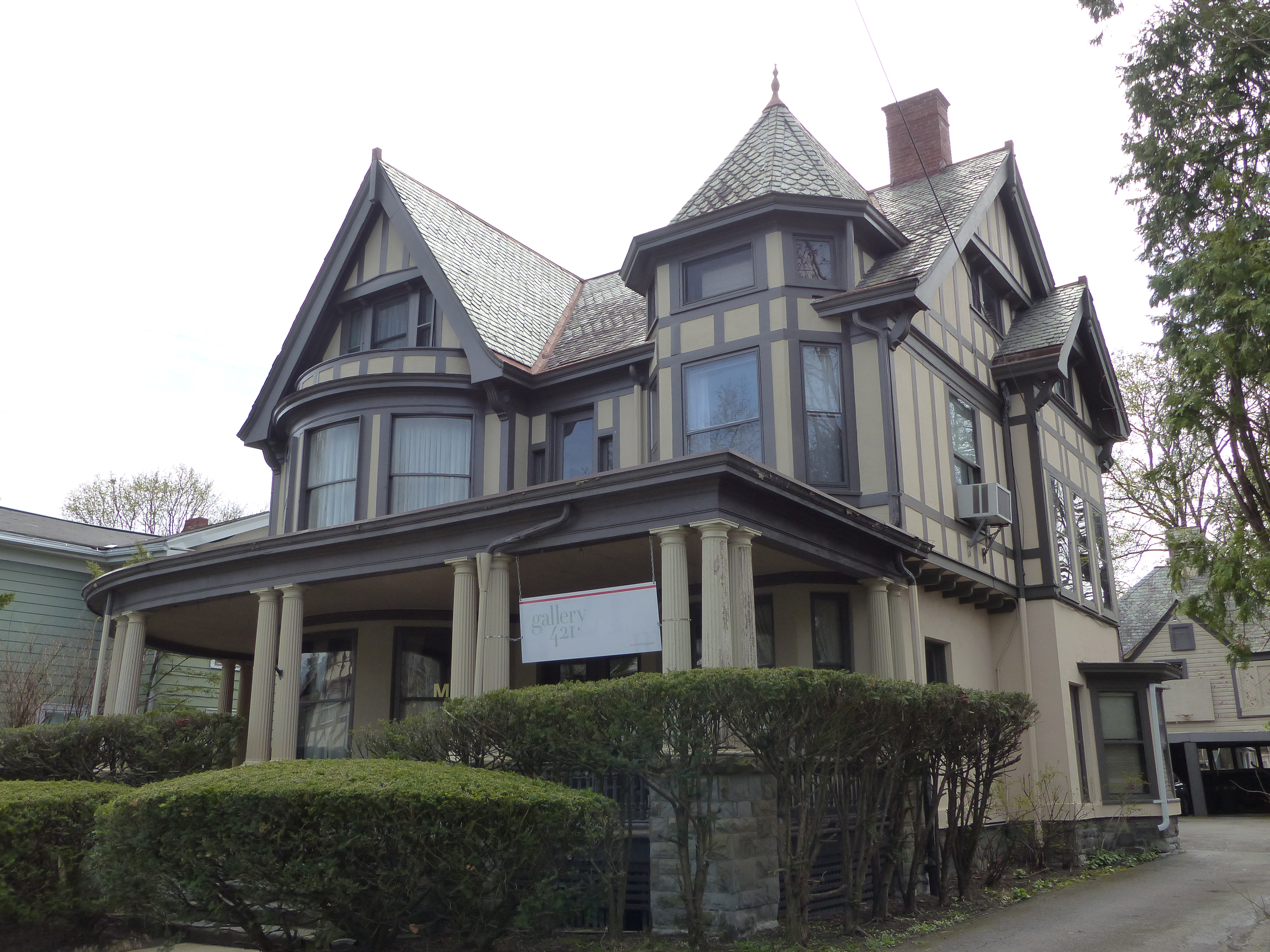
House, Elmira, New York, 1906.

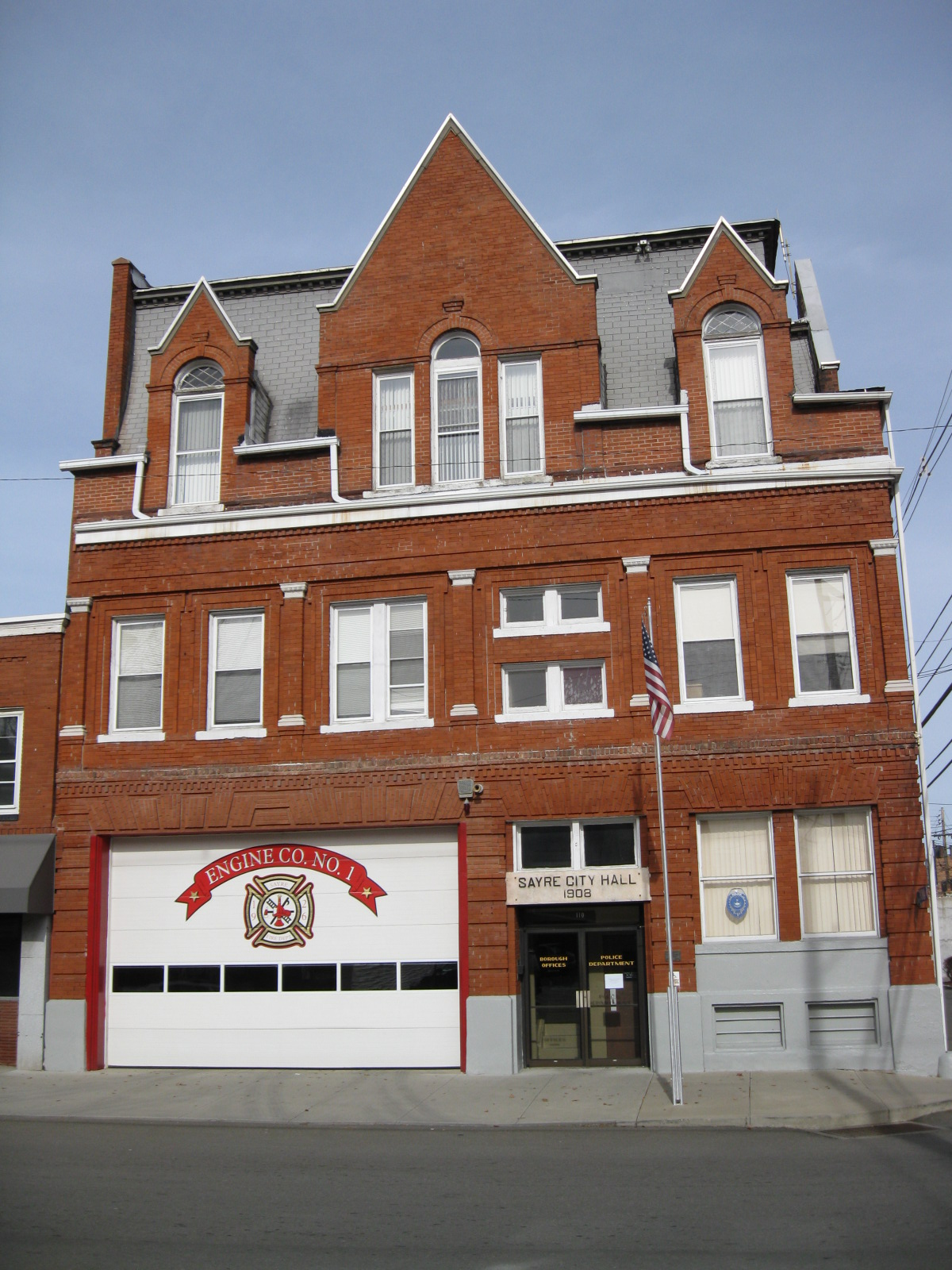
Sayre Borough Hall, Sayre, Pennsylvania, 1908.

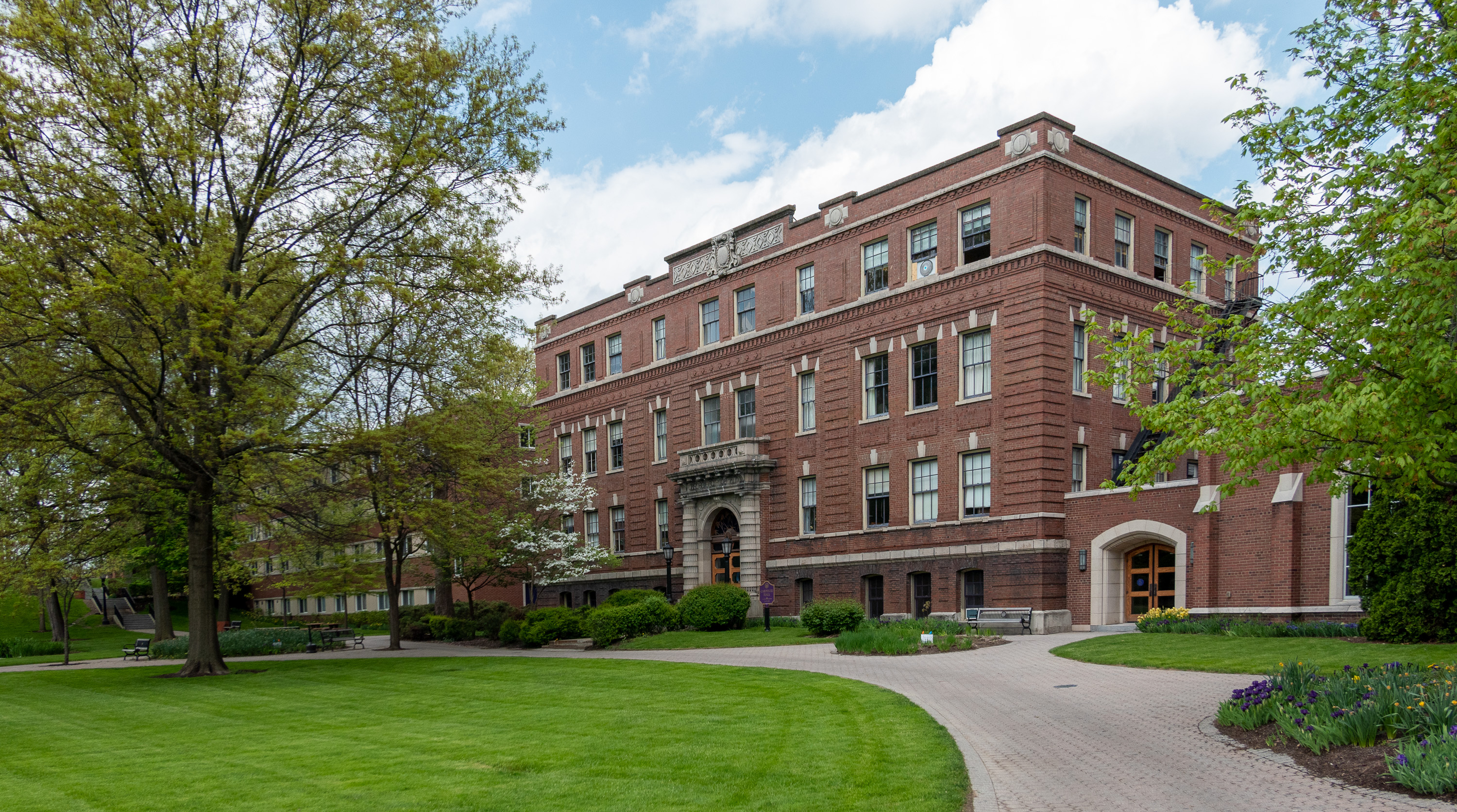
Carnegie Hall, Elmira College, Elmira, New York, 1911.

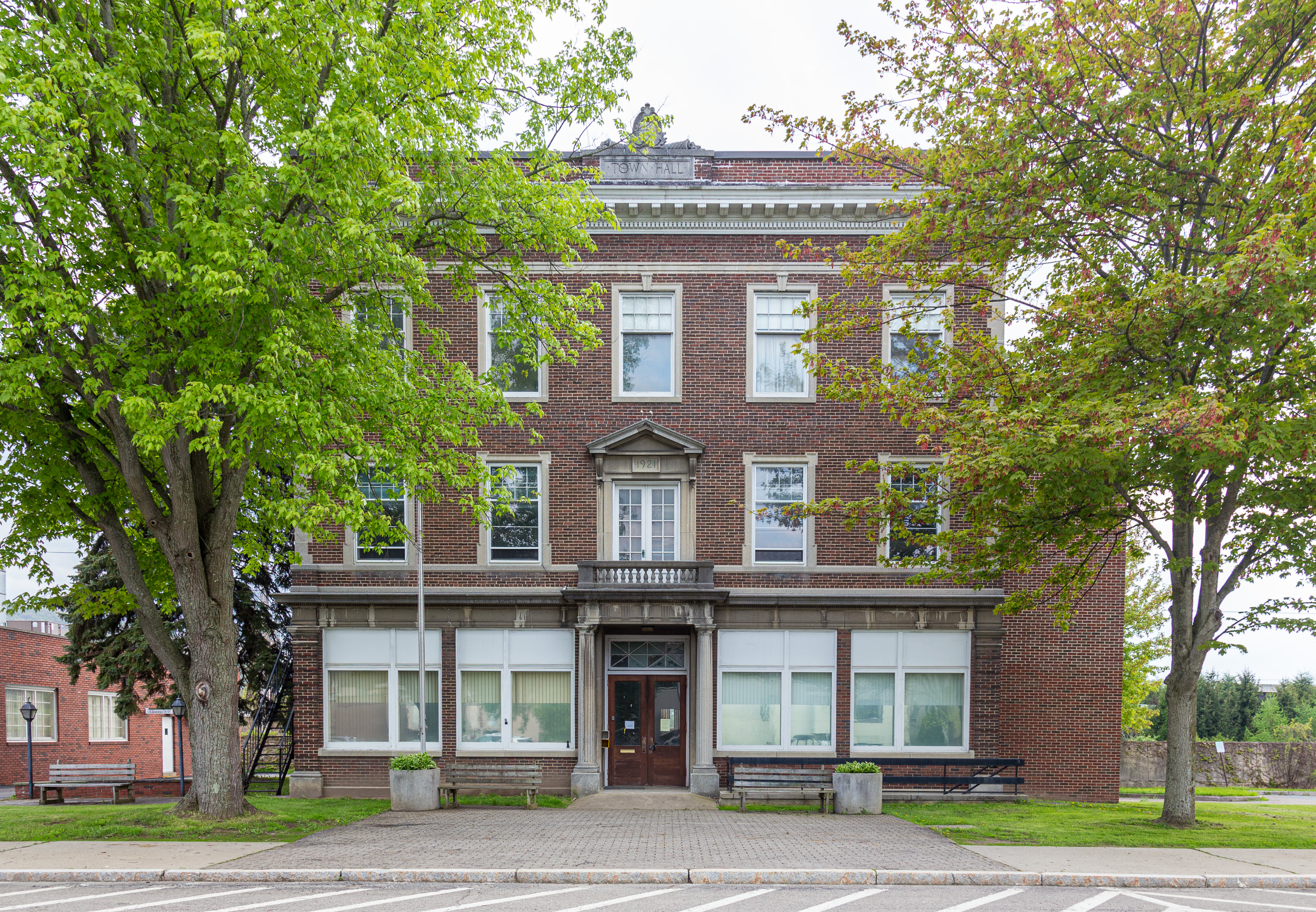
Erwin Town Hall, Painted Post, New York, 1921.

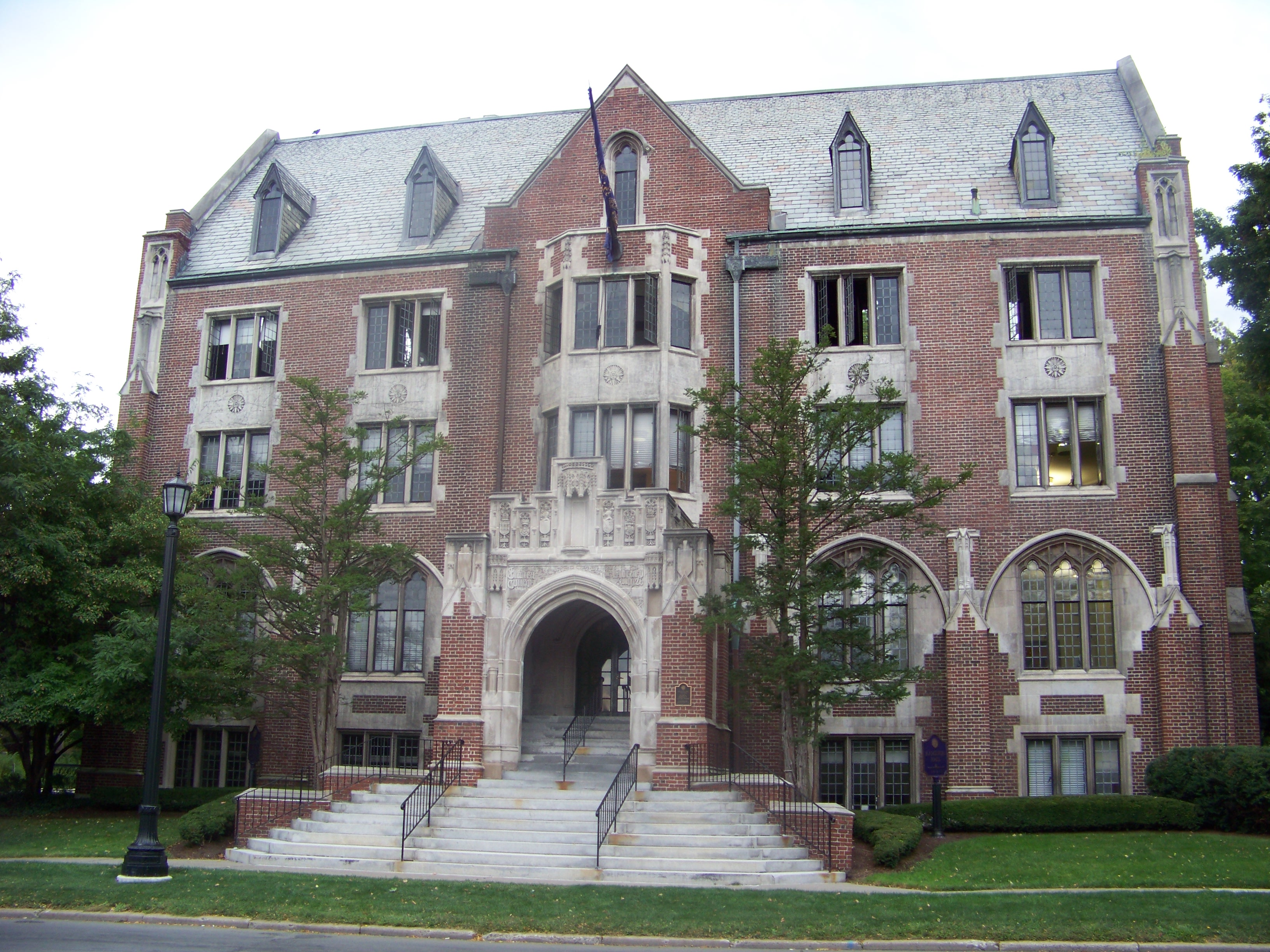
Tompkins Hall, Elmira College, Elmira, New York, 1927.
