= St. Patrick's Parochial Residence-Convent and School =

- U.S. National Register of Historic Places
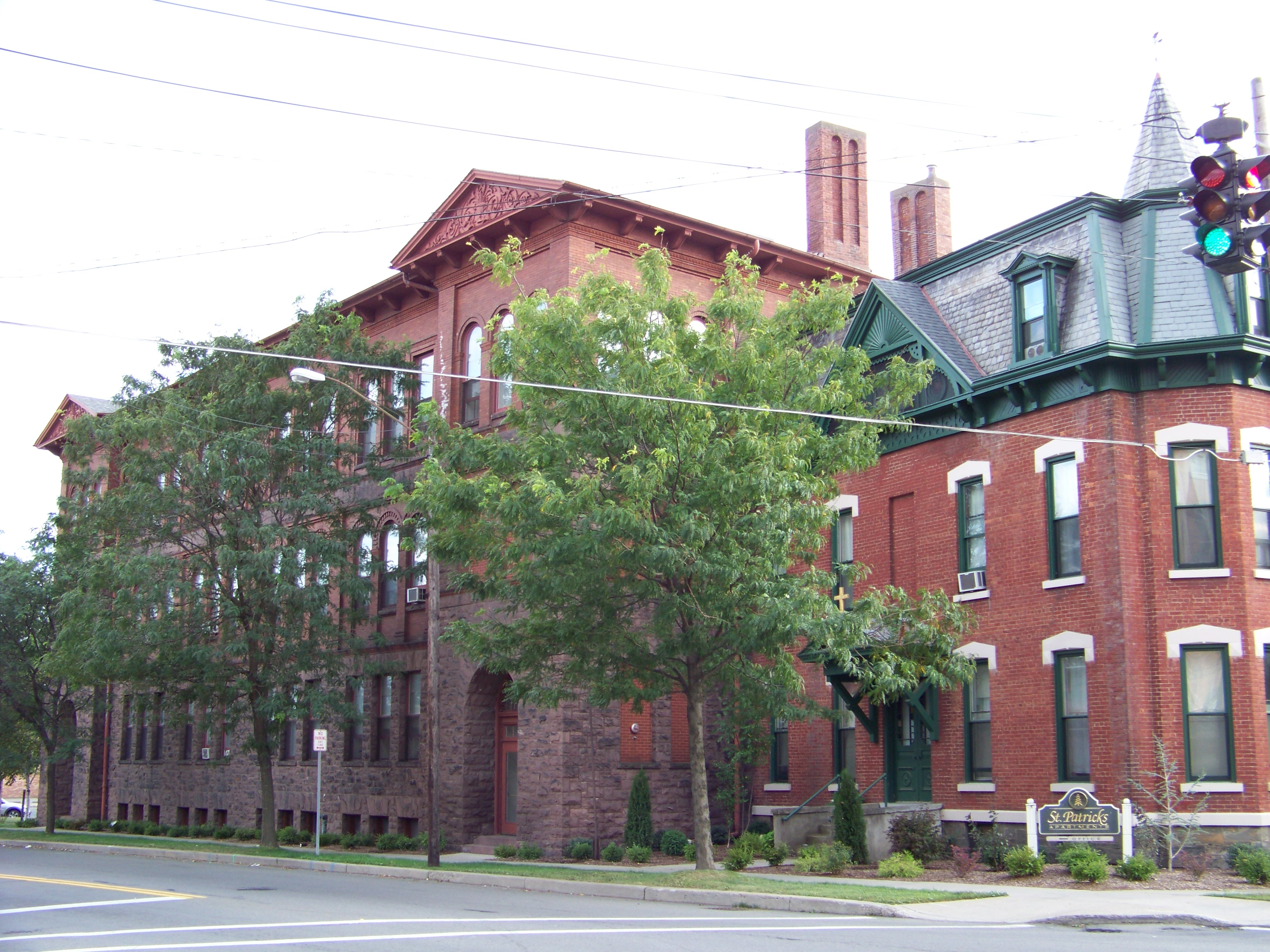

- Location within New York Location within the United States
- Location: 515-517 Park Pl., Elmira, New York
- Coordinates: 42°5′36″N 76°48′40″W
- Area: less than one acre
- Built: 1884
- Architect: Huron O. Smith (1884); Pierce & Bickford (1892-94)
- Architectural style: Late 19th And 20th Century Revivals, Second Empire, Second Renaissance Revival
- NRHP reference No.: 92001561
- Added to NRHP: November 05, 1992

St. Patrick's Parochial Residence-Convent and School is a historic Roman Catholic parochial residence (rectory and convent), and school complex located at Elmira in Chemung County, New York. The structures are across from St. Patrick's Catholic Church.

The residence was built in 1884 and is a two-story brick structure in the Second Empire style. It has been adapted for senior citizen housing. The school was erected in 1892-1894 and is a hipped roof, three story structure on a high basement in the Second Renaissance Revival style. The architect for the residence was Huron O. Smith, and the architects for the school were Pierce & Bickford, all of Elmira.

It was listed on the National Register of Historic Places in 1992.
