= Clinton–Columbia Historic District =

Historic district in New York, United States

- U.S. National Register of Historic Places
- U.S. Historic district
- Location within New York Location within the United States
- Location: 505-605 College Ave., 300-431 W. Clinton, 608-612 Columbia, 348-354 W. 4th & 513-602 Davis Sts., Elmira, New York
- Coordinates: 42°05′33″N 76°49′04″W
- Area: 17.23 acres (6.97 ha)
- Built: c. 1860-1924
- Architect: Pierce & Bickford; Pierce & Dockstader et al.
- Architectural style: Greek Revival, Italianate, Second Empire, Queen Anne, Colonial Revival, Craftsman, etc.
- NRHP reference No.: 15000308
- Added to NRHP: June 1, 2015

Clinton–Columbia Historic District is a national historic district located at Elmira, Chemung County, New York. It encompasses 83 contributing buildings in a predominantly residential section of Elmira. It developed between about 1860 and 1924, and includes notable examples of Greek Revival, Italianate, Second Empire, Queen Anne, Colonial Revival, and American Craftsman style architecture. Notable buildings include two sets of Italianate style row houses and two sets of Second Empire style row houses.

It was added to the National Register of Historic Places in 2015.
