= National Register of Historic Places listings in Chemung County, New York =

Location of Chemung County in New York

List of the National Register of Historic Places listings in Chemung County, New York

This is intended to be a complete list of properties and districts listed on the National Register of Historic Places in Chemung County, New York. The locations of National Register properties and districts (at least for all showing latitude and longitude coordinates below) may be seen in a map by clicking on "Map of all coordinates". One site, the Newtown Battlefield, is further designated a National Historic Landmark.

This National Park Service list is complete through NPS recent listings posted February 27, 2026.

Contents: Counties in New York
Albany (Albany) – Allegany – Bronx – Broome – Cattaraugus – Cayuga – Chautauqua – Chemung – Chenango – Clinton – Columbia – Cortland – Delaware – Dutchess (Poughkeepsie, Rhinebeck) – Erie (Buffalo) – Essex – Franklin – Fulton – Genesee – Greene – Hamilton – Herkimer – Jefferson – Kings – Lewis – Livingston – Madison – Monroe (Rochester) – Montgomery – Nassau – New York (Below 14th Street, 14th to 59th Streets, 59th to 110th Streets, Above 110th Street, Islands) – Niagara (Niagara Falls) – Oneida – Onondaga (Syracuse) – Ontario – Orange – Orleans – Oswego – Otsego – Putnam – Queens – Rensselaer – Richmond – Rockland – St. Lawrence – Saratoga – Schenectady – Schoharie – Schuyler – Seneca – Steuben – Suffolk – Sullivan – Tioga – Tompkins – Ulster – Warren – Washington – Wayne – Westchester (Northern, Southern, New Rochelle, Peekskill, Yonkers) – Wyoming – Yates

== Listings county-wide ==
	Name on the Register	Image	Date listed	Location	City or town	Description
1	The George and Theodora Bragg House		August 19, 2025 (#100012131)	611 Jay Street; 42°05′44″N 76°47′53″W	Elmira	
2	John Brand Jr. House	John Brand Jr. House	February 22, 2010 (#10000024)	351 Maple Ave. 42°05′06″N 76°47′49″W	Elmira	
3	John Brand Sr. House	John Brand Sr. House	November 10, 2010 (#10000913)	405 Maple Ave. 42°05′04″N 76°47′45″W	Elmira	
4	Buildings at 104–116 West Water St.	Buildings at 104–116 West Water St.	December 17, 2008 (#08001230)	104–116 W. Water St. 42°05′17″N 76°48′19″W	Elmira	Demolished in 2014 and 2015
5	Chemung Canal Bank Building	Chemung Canal Bank Building	June 23, 1978 (#78001844)	415 E. Water St. 42°05′18″N 76°48′01″W	Elmira	Built 1833; oldest commercial building in Elmira
6	Chemung County Courthouse Complex	Chemung County Courthouse Complex	August 12, 1971 (#71000531)	210-228 Lake St., between Market and E. Church Sts. 42°05′26″N 76°48′07″W	Elmira	Courthouse, District Attorney's and Treasurer's Building, County Clerk's Office and Courthouse Annex; built from 1836 through 1899
7	Chemung District School No. 10	Chemung District School No. 10	May 21, 2008 (#08000449)	Old NY 17 at Lowman Rd. 42°01′44″N 76°42′56″W	Lowman	
8	Chemung Railway Depot-Horseheads	Chemung Railway Depot-Horseheads	December 12, 1996 (#96001442)	312 W. Broad St. 42°09′59″N 76°49′27″W	Horseheads	Built 1866; in use through 1956
9	Clinton–Columbia Historic District		June 1, 2015 (#15000308)	505-605 College Ave., 300-431 W. Clinton, 608-612 Columbia, 348-354 W. 4th & 513-602 Davis Sts. 42°05′33″N 76°49′04″W	Elmira	Residential area with many late 19th- and early 20th-century home built during Elmira's industrial boom
10	Warren E. Eaton Motorless Flight Facility	Warren E. Eaton Motorless Flight Facility	September 25, 2013 (#13000778)	62 Soaring Hill Dr. 42°07′18″N 76°54′05″W	Big Flats	Site of early development of American gliding
11	Christ Episcopal Church	Christ Episcopal Church	August 2, 2000 (#00000879)	117 Main St. 42°00′54″N 76°43′39″W	Wellsburg	Designed by Issac O. Perry; built in 1869
12	Elmira Civic Historic District	Elmira Civic Historic District	July 30, 1980 (#80002596)	Portions of Lake, East Church, East Water, Clemens Ctr. Pkwy., East Market, Baldwin, William, & Carroll Sts. 42°05′26″N 76°48′09″W	Elmira	Governmental center of early Elmira; includes Chemung County Courthouse Complex, U.S. Post Office, Armory Building and City Hall
13	Elmira Coca-Cola Bottling Company Works	Elmira Coca-Cola Bottling Company Works	May 23, 1997 (#97000423)	415 W. 2nd St. 42°05′21″N 76°48′58″W	Elmira	Art Moderne style building; built in 1939; significant for architecture and contribution to history of industry in Elmira
14	Elmira College Old Campus	Elmira College Old Campus	August 23, 1984 (#84002068)	Roughly bounded by College and W. Washington Aves., N. Main St. and Park Pl. 42°05′52″N 76°48′53″W	Elmira	First college in the U.S. to have a degree program for women comparable to those at men's schools
15	Elmira Heights Village Hall	Elmira Heights Village Hall	May 6, 1982 (#82003349)	268 E. 14th St. 42°07′46″N 76°49′18″W	Elmira Heights	Built in 1896; designed by local architects Pierce & Bickford
16	Emmanuel Episcopal Church	Emmanuel Episcopal Church	November 19, 1998 (#98001395)	380 Pennsylvania Ave. 42°04′48″N 76°48′11″W	Elmira	
17	Erste Deutsche Evangelische Kirche	Erste Deutsche Evangelische Kirche	October 31, 2007 (#07001121)	160 Madison Ave. 42°05′27″N 76°47′56″W	Elmira	Built 1898-1899; for German American congregation
18	Alexander Eustace House	Alexander Eustace House	January 4, 2012 (#11000996)	401 Maple Ave. 42°05′05″N 76°47′46″W	Elmira	
19	Dr. Hovey Everett House	Dr. Hovey Everett House	January 25, 2007 (#06001299)	1594 Cty Rte 60; 42°03′39″N 76°45′29″W	Lowman	
20	Fire Station No. 4	Fire Station No. 4	March 24, 1988 (#88000242)	301 Maxwell Pl. 42°06′17″N 76°48′26″W	Elmira	Built in 1897; designed by local architects Pierce & Bickford
21	William S. Gerity House	William S. Gerity House	February 22, 2010 (#10000025)	415 William St. 42°05′38″N 76°48′10″W	Elmira	
22	Goff, Way and Brand Leaf Tobacco Warehouse	Goff, Way and Brand Leaf Tobacco Warehouse	August 26, 2022 (#100008028)	310 Academy Pl. 42°05′32″N 76°48′08″W	Elmira	
23	Hanover Square Historic District	Hanover Square Historic District	October 29, 1982 (#82001094)	Jct. of E. and W. Franklin and N. and S. Main Sts. 42°10′03″N 76°49′16″W	Horseheads	Downtown business district; built mainly 1862-1882 after fire levelled town
24	Horseheads 1855 Extension Historic District	Horseheads 1855 Extension Historic District	July 30, 1980 (#80002597)	Grand Central Ave., Fletcher, Sayre, W. Mill and Center Sts. 42°09′46″N 76°49′14″W	Horseheads	
25	F. M. Howell and Company	F. M. Howell and Company	August 27, 1984 (#84002069)	79-105 Pennsylvania Ave., 50 Pennsylvania Ave. 42°05′11″N 76°48′04″W	Elmira	
26	John W. Jones Court	John W. Jones Court	February 14, 2017 (#100000645)	603-657 Dickinson St. 42°05′44″N 76°48′19″W	Elmira	Extensively renovated in 2018-19, now called Libertad
27	John W. Jones House	John W. Jones House	October 10, 2003 (#03001019)	1250 Davis St. 42°06′27″N 76°49′26″W	Elmira	Home of former escaped slave, active abolitionist; worked with the Underground Railroad; sexton of Woodlawn Cemetery; buried Confederate dead
28	Maple Avenue Historic District	Maple Avenue Historic District	August 13, 2013 (#13000599)	310 to 782 Maple (west side), 351 to 761 Maple (east side); 42°04′53″N 76°47′40″W	Elmira	
29	Miller Block and Townhouse	Miller Block and Townhouse	June 26, 2017 (#100001244)	226 S. Main & 204-206 W. Henry Sts. 42°04′57″N 76°48′19″W	Elmira	1887 brick building was one of first major commercial properties in the city's Southside neighborhood; also one of only two extant by local builder Huron O. Smith
30	Mount Saviour Monastery	Mount Saviour Monastery	January 27, 2015 (#14001213)	231, 121, 122 Monastery & 65, 212 Fisher Hill Rds; 42°05′24″N 76°57′34″W	Pine City vicinity	Farm in continuous operation since 1865 demonstrates shift from large-scale cash crop production to smaller, sustainable specialty crops after purchase by monks in 1950
31	Near Westside Historic District	Near Westside Historic District	December 22, 1983 (#83003906)	Roughly bounded by Chemung River, College Ave., 2nd and Hoffman Sts. 42°05′23″N 76°49′00″W	Elmira	
32	Newtown Battlefield	Newtown Battlefield	November 28, 1972 (#72000826)	6 mi. SE of Elmira on NY 17; 42°02′18″N 76°43′33″W	Elmira	Site of only major battle of the Sullivan Expedition; ordered by the Continental Congress to end the threat of the Iroquois; the Iroquois were defeated decisively
33	North Main and West Water Commercial Historic District		February 16, 2016 (#16000015)	100-184 N. Main & 200-233 W. Water Sts.; also 32-261 West Water St. and Wisner Park, North Main, West Grey, West Church and West First Sts. 42°05′15″N 76°48′27″W	Elmira	Business district reflecting city's westward expansion along trolley lines in late 19th-early 20th centuries; boundary increase approve March 7, 2022.
34	Park Church	Park Church	May 25, 1977 (#77000936)	208 W. Gray St. 42°05′21″N 76°48′33″W	Elmira	
35	Pentecostal Holy Temple Church of Jesus Christ	Pentecostal Holy Temple Church of Jesus Christ	November 19, 1998 (#98001387)	351 Division St. 42°06′26″N 76°48′31″W	Elmira	Address is currently an empty lot
36	Pratt House	Pratt House	November 21, 2008 (#08001075)	413 Lake St. 42°05′37″N 76°48′15″W	Elmira	
37	Quarry Farm	Quarry Farm	March 13, 1975 (#75001177)	Crane Rd. 42°06′37″N 76°46′58″W	Elmira	
38	Riverside Cemetery	Riverside Cemetery	November 21, 2012 (#12000953)	County Route 60; 42°01′45″N 76°40′37″W	Lowman vicinity	
39	St. Matthew's Episcopal Church	St. Matthew's Episcopal Church	September 18, 2017 (#100001622)	408 S. Main St. 42°09′55″N 76°49′10″W	Horseheads	
40	St. Patrick's Parochial Residence-Convent and School	St. Patrick's Parochial Residence-Convent and School	November 5, 1992 (#92001561)	515-517 Park Pl. 42°05′36″N 76°48′40″W	Elmira	
41	Scotchtown Cemetery	Scotchtown Cemetery	December 23, 2008 (#08001229)	NY 223; 42°10′36″N 76°41′55″W	Erin	
42	Stowell House		August 26, 2022 (#100008029)	319 William St. 42°05′34″N 76°48′06″W	Elmira	
43	Teal Park	Teal Park	October 7, 1983 (#83003907)	Steuben, Pine, and W. Main Sts. 42°09′51″N 76°49′11″W	Horseheads	Public greenspace; location of the Zim bandstand; designed by political cartoonist Eugene Zimmerman
44	Trinity Church	Trinity Church	October 31, 2007 (#07001122)	304 N. Main St. 42°05′24″N 76°48′30″W	Elmira	Designed by Henry Dudley; built 1855-1858. Final service held September 6, 2020.
45	George Washington School	George Washington School	January 11, 2017 (#100000480)	430 W. Washington Ave. 42°05′51″N 76°49′16″W	Elmira	1939 Art Deco school built as PWA project; used until 2006
46	Woodlawn Cemetery and Woodlawn National Cemetery	Woodlawn Cemetery and Woodlawn National Cemetery	October 6, 2004 (#04001117)	Walnut and Davis Sts., West Hill and Bancroft Rds. 42°06′36″N 76°49′40″W	Elmira	Burial place of Mark Twain, Ernie Davis, Hal Roach, John W. Jones; National portion begun with interment of Confederate prisoners of war during the American Civil War
47	Zimmerman House	Zimmerman House	October 7, 1983 (#83003912)	601 Pine St. 42°09′44″N 76°49′12″W	Horseheads	Home of political cartoonist Eugene Zimmerman

== See also ==
- National Register of Historic Places listings in New York
