= Baldwin, New York =

- Town
- Location within New York Location within the United States
- Coordinates: 42°05′58″N 76°39′49″W
- Country: United States
- State: New York
- County: Chemung

Government
  - Type: Town Council
  - Town Supervisor: Russell Purvis
  - Town Council: Members' List: Nancy Purvis; Patrick Collins; Joshua Smith; Zebulin Wolcott

Area
  - Total: 25.74 sq mi (66.66 km^{2})
  - Land: 25.72 sq mi (66.61 km^{2})
  - Water: 0.019 sq mi (0.05 km^{2})
- Elevation: 1,020 ft (310 m)

Population (2020)
  - Total: 818 ▼
  - Estimate (2021): 805
  - Density: 31.5/sq mi (12.18/km^{2})
- Time zone: Eastern (EST)
- ZIP Codes: 14861 (Lowman); 14901 (Elmira); 14838 (Erin)
- Area code: 607
- FIPS code: 36-015-04132
- Website: tobaldwin.com

Baldwin is a town in Chemung County, New York, United States. The population was 818 at the 2020 census. The town name is derived from Thomas and Waterman Baldwin, two of the earliest settlers of the area. The town is east of Elmira. It is part of the Elmira Metropolitan Statistical Area.

== History ==
=== Early settlement ===
While it is most likely that hunters and trappers passed through the area in earlier years, Baldwin was first settled around 1813, credit given to Charles and Warren Granger as being the first white settlers to the area. The brothers put down roots on what was first called "Hammond Corners" and would later become North Chemung. The trek to their new home would have been difficult, due in part to thick virgin forest and ravines as well as swampland thick with underbrush.

Soon after the Granger brothers, Henry Tice came to Hammond Corners with his family from Ulster County in downstate New York in 1815. Also in 1815 came Jason Hammond with his five sons, Elisha, James, Robert, David and Cornelius. In the years that followed many more families came from New England, including Peter McCumber for whom the area known as "McCumber Corners" is named. Other families were the Whitakers, Collsons, Browns, Elstons, Drakes and many more. Many of these families still reside in the township or have close ties.

The first church society was organized in 1818 with worship services being held in various citizens' homes. It wasn't until 1852 that a church was built to serve all different faiths of the community. This church is the one that is still in use in North Chemung known as the United Methodist Church. In 1910 a church was built in Hicks and it too continues to be used.

The first school in Baldwin was started in 1819 with the children taught by John Tuthill Jr in a cabin owned by John Brooks. The first schoolhouse was built in 1821 at the corner of the North Chemung Cemetery. In 1869 a new schoolhouse was built across the road and is still standing. It has been a store, a private home and now belongs to the United Methodist Church primarily used to house the local food pantry.

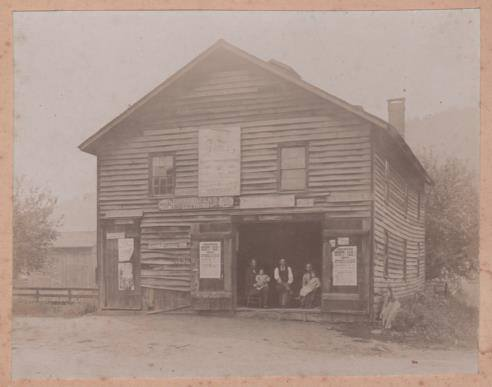
Blacksmith shop in North Chemung, formerly known as Hammond's Corners 1897 - Courtright Collection

=== Early firsts ===
- First child born - Simeon Hammond in 1815
- First death - Thomas Weaver (killed by a falling log) in 1820
- First wedding - Nicholas Patterson to Anna Tice in 1818
- First local physician - Doctor J.W. Moore in 1836
- First mail service - In 1843, Anthony Collson, Postmaster

=== History as a town ===
The town of Baldwin was founded by an act of the state legislature on April 7, 1856, from part of the town of Chemung. The first town meeting was held May 6, 1856, at the house of Daniel R. Harris, innkeeper. William H. Little was elected Town Supervisor, Johnson Little as Town Clerk, Daniel R. Harris as Commissioner of the Highways, and William R. Drake, William and Jeremiah McCumber as Justices of the Peace.

In 1856 Baldwin was a small village; the 1860 census shows a population of 274. There were several shops and businesses that were closely linked to the agricultural makeup of the town. There were also sawmills and lumber not used locally was floated down Baldwin Creek, which runs through the town, and on to Elmira to be sold.

Social life was very localized, but for holidays and special occasions there would have been community-wide square dances filled with fun and music. In the early years of the town medicine shows and peddlers' arrivals would have been other exciting events for the people living there.

In 1875 there were 1,006 people living in Baldwin. However, with the rise of the Industrial Age there was less demand for handcrafted goods produced locally. With the completion of several railroad lines in Elmira more people began leaving Baldwin to make a living working in the factories in Elmira and beyond. By 1911 the town's population was down to 476.

On May 22, 1923, one hundred citizens of the town petitioned the supervisors of the county to have the town of Baldwin dissolved. The reason they gave was that the tax rates were excessive for citizens because of the lack of businesses in the township. It was proposed that the town be parcelled off and incorporated into the neighboring towns of Erin and Chemung. However, the petition was denied by the county, as once a boundary is laid down on the official maps it would take too much legal formality to change, and a unanimous demand would be required to do so.

In 1956 the town celebrated its 100th anniversary with a parade, dance and other fun. The town celebrated its 150th anniversary in 2006 much in the same fashion, with many local and state dignitaries in attendance.

The census in 2010 listed the total population of Baldwin at 832. Farming continues to be a way of life for some in the town to this day, but to a much lesser extent. The past 20 years have seen many family farms, specifically dairies, close down operations as the cost of farming outweighs the income. Until recently there was an increased interest in natural gas drilling within the town and region until a state moratorium was made permanent by Governor Andrew Cuomo. Short of a few small home-based businesses, the majority of Baldwin's residents are employed in Elmira and the surrounding communities.

Life in the 21st century places demands on the citizens that take them outside the town's borders for both work and play. Still there is much history in this sleepy community, and the traces of yesterday are still to be found. In fact many of the older roads used in days gone by are now little more than cleared paths through the woods between existing roads for hikers to roam. There is evidence along the banks of Baldwin Creek remaining from the days of lumber mills that once occupied its shores, and many of the home buildings still stand, some still occupied by the descendants of those who built them.

== Geography ==
The town of Baldwin lies in the southeastern section of Chemung County. It is the second to smallest town in the county and is bounded on the north by the towns of Erin and Van Etten, to the east by Barton in Tioga County, to the south and east by Chemung, and to the west by Elmira. The main areas of population are the hamlets of North Chemung and Hicks. Hicks is located in the extreme northeastern area of the town, and North Chemung is more to the center.

According to the United States Census Bureau, the town has a total area of 25.8 square miles (66.7 km^{2}), of which 0.019 square miles (0.05 km^{2}), or 0.08%, is water. Most of the town's land drains to the Chemung River, a tributary of the Susquehanna River. Baldwin Creek drains the center and northwestern parts of the town, Wynkoop Creek drains the northeastern part around Hicks, and smaller creeks drain the southern part of the town to the Chemung River. The far eastern end of the town drains to Cayuta Creek, a direct tributary of the Susquehanna.

Laying on flat land between high hills, North Chemung is exceedingly sensitive to climatic changes and at one time was known as "The Icebox of Chemung County" for its winter temperatures being much colder than elsewhere in Chemung County.

== Demographics ==
Historical population
| Census | Pop. | Note | %± |
|---|---|---|---|
| 1860 | 918 | | — |
| 1870 | 969 | | 5.6% |
| 1880 | 968 | | −0.1% |
| 1890 | 733 | | −24.3% |
| 1900 | 664 | | −9.4% |
| 1910 | 476 | | −28.3% |
| 1920 | 503 | | 5.7% |
| 1930 | 483 | | −4.0% |
| 1940 | 457 | | −5.4% |
| 1950 | 557 | | 21.9% |
| 1960 | 735 | | 32.0% |
| 1970 | 889 | | 21.0% |
| 1980 | 892 | | 0.3% |
| 1990 | 829 | | −7.1% |
| 2000 | 853 | | 2.9% |
| 2010 | 832 | | −2.5% |
| 2020 | 818 | | −1.7% |
| 2021 (est.) | 805 | ▼ | −1.6% |
U.S. Decennial Census

As of the census of 2000, there were 853 people, 334 households, and 254 families residing in the town. The population density was 33.1 inhabitants per square mile (12.8/km^{2}). There were 362 housing units at an average density of 14.1 per square mile (5.4/km^{2}). The racial makeup of the town was 97.30% White, 0.82% African American, 0.47% Native American, 0.23% Asian, and 1.17% from two or more races. Hispanic or Latino of any race were 0.23% of the population.

There were 334 households, out of which 27.5% had children under the age of 18 living with them, 62.9% were married couples living together, 7.5% had a female householder with no husband present, and 23.7% were non-families. 20.7% of all households were made up of individuals, and 7.2% had someone living alone who was 65 years of age or older. The average household size was 2.55 and the average family size was 2.89.

In the town, the population was spread out, with 23.4% under the age of 18, 6.4% from 18 to 24, 29.2% from 25 to 44, 28.0% from 45 to 64, and 12.9% who were 65 years of age or older. The median age was 40 years. For every 100 females, there were 109.6 males. For every 100 females age 18 and over, there were 97.3 males.

The median income for a household in the town was $39,219, and the median income for a family was $42,250. Males had a median income of $31,424 versus $23,558 for females. The per capita income for the town was $19,075. About 5.9% of families and 9.2% of the population were below the poverty line, including 10.4% of those under age 18 and 10.5% of those age 65 or over.

== Communities and locations in the Town of Baldwin ==
- Baldwin Creek – A stream flowing out of the western side of the town.
- Hicks – A hamlet in the eastern part of the town on County Road 3.
- Maccombers Corners – A location on County Road 22, east of N. Chemung
- North Chemung – A hamlet at the intersection of Country Roads 1 and 41, formerly known as Hammond's Corners
- Wynkoop Creek – A stream flowing through the east of Baldwin.
- Cooperstown - Oak Hill Rd, off Hogback Rd.
- Hemlock Grove - Area between North Chemung and Little Road.
