= Brett Bodine =

American racing driver (born 1959)

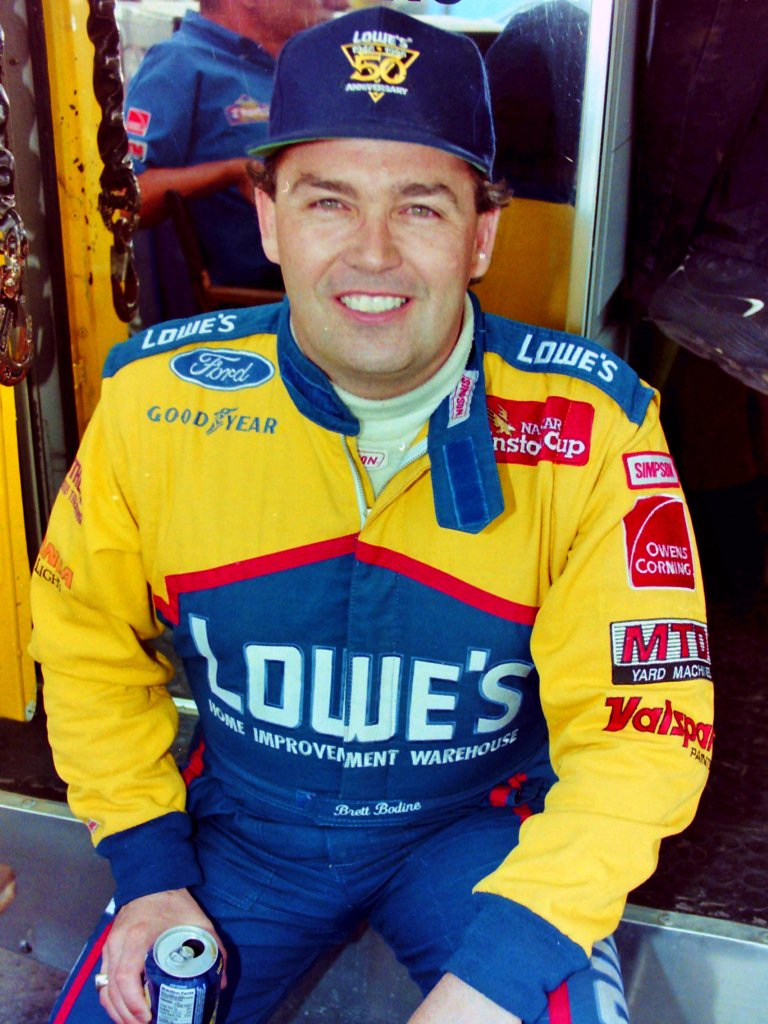
- Bodine in 1996
- Born: January 11, 1959 (age 67); Chemung, New York, U.S.
- Awards: 1986 NASCAR Busch Series Most Popular Driver; Inducted into Modified Hall of Fame

NASCAR Cup Series career
- 480 races run over 18 years
- Best finish: 12th (1990)
- First race: 1986 World 600 (Charlotte)
- Last race: 2003 MBNA Armed Forces Family 400 (Dover)
- First win: 1990 First Union 400 (North Wilkesboro)
Wins	Top tens	Poles
1	61	5

NASCAR O'Reilly Auto Parts Series career
- 77 races run over 6 years
- Best finish: 2nd (1986)
- First race: 1985 Budweiser 200 (Bristol)
- Last race: 1999 Kmart 200 (Rockingham)
- First win: 1985 Miller 200 (Martinsville)
- Last win: 1986 Winn-Dixie 500 (Martinsville)
Wins	Top tens	Poles
5	52	16

NASCAR FedEx Freight Truck Series career
- 3 races run over 1 year
- Best finish: 66th (1998)
- First race: 1998 Chevy Trucks Challenge (Orlando)
- Last race: 1998 NAPA 250 (Martinsville)
Wins	Top tens	Poles
0	0	0

ARCA Menards Series career
- 2 races run over 2 years
- Best finish: 75th (1985)
- First race: 1985 Kroger 200 (IRP)
- Last race: 1986 Jiffy Lube 300 (Atlanta)
Wins	Top tens	Poles
0	1	2
- Statistics up to date as of April 15, 2013.

Brett Elias Bodine III (born January 11, 1959) is an American former stock car racing driver, former driver of the pace car in Cup Series events, and current NASCAR employee. He is the younger brother of 1986 Daytona 500 winner Geoff Bodine and the older brother of 2006 and 2010 NASCAR Camping World Truck Series champion Todd Bodine. He was born in Chemung, New York. Bodine has been named one of the 50 greatest NASCAR modified drivers of all time, was the runner-up for the 1986 Busch Series championship, and collected a total of five Busch Series wins and sixteen pole positions. Bodine made 480 Cup Series starts with one win and five pole positions. He has led over one-thousand career laps in both the NASCAR Winston Cup Series and the NASCAR Busch Series.

== Early life ==
Bodine attended Alfred State College and received an associate's degree in mechanical engineering before he became a professional race car driver. He began in hobby stock races at the Chemung Speedrome (owned by his parents) in 1977. In 1979, he started racing a part-time schedule in the NASCAR Modified Nation Championship series, placing 35th in the final standings. In 1980, Bodine moved up to 24th in the final standings with a best finish of third at Stafford Motor Speedway, still driving a part time schedule. In 1983, Bodine picked up his first national championship win at Stafford Motor Speedway while placing seventh in the final standings. He also placed fifth in the Northeast Region of the NASCAR Winston Weekly Racing series with six wins in 54 starts. In 1984, he picked up another National Championship win, this time at Oxford Maine. He also placed twelfth in the Northeast Region of the NASCAR Winston Weekly Racing series with three wins in 37 starts. Between June 1983 and August 1984, he won seven feature races at Stafford and helped his car-owner secure the 1984 Stafford Motor Speedway track championship. At the conclusion of the 1984 season, Bodine moved south to go to work for Rick Hendrick, whom his brother Geoff was driving for at the time.

== NASCAR beginnings ==
While working for Hendrick, Bodine found time to make a handful of modified starts in 1985 and won the most prestigious event of the season, the Race of Champions at Pocono. The 1985 season also saw Bodine make his debut in the NASCAR Busch Series in the No. 15 Pontiac at Bristol. The small team did not have a pit crew and had to do the whole race on a single set of tires but he managed to qualify seventh and finish twelfth in his debut race. Bodine's breakout race in NASCAR came when rain forced a scheduling conflict between the Busch Series race at Martinsville and the Cup Series race. Geoff Bodine (who was driving full-time for Hendrick in the Cup Series) was scheduled to drive in the Busch Series race and Bodine got the chance to drive Rick Hendrick's No. 5 Pontiac as a last minute fill-in. Bodine started second and won the race in only his second career start. This was the first win for Hendrick with the Levi Garrett sponsorship and resulted in Bodine getting funding from Levi Garrett to run eleven additional races that season. His under the lights win at Bristol win was the first Xfinity series race to be televised live in prime time. By the end of the 1985 season, Bodine had made thirteen starts with three poles, three wins, seven top-fives, and ten top-tens.

Bodine's success in the part-time Busch Series ride in 1985 lead to a full time opportunity in 1986, driving the No. 00 Thomas Brothers Old Country Ham Oldsmobile for Howard Thomas. Hendrick was not interested in fielding a full-time Busch Series team but helped Bodine bring an associate sponsorship from Exxon over to the 00 team. He picked up his first pole of 1986 in the second race of the season at Rockingham, leading eighteen laps before falling out with mechanical trouble. Bodine picked up his second pole of the season at Martinsville and lead the first 21 laps before getting hit by Kyle Petty while working lapped traffic and then taken out in a second incident later in the race. Three DNFs in the season's first five races left Bodine fourteenth in points. Bodine then recorded nine straight top-ten finishes and another pole at Dover to move to second in the points standings. This streak was followed by back to back DNFs at IRP and South Boston and dropped Bodine to seventh in points after the season's sixteenth race. Bodine rallied to finish the season with fifteen straight top-ten finishes including wins at Bristol and the season finale at Martinsville. After Jack Ingram was suspended for two races for driving backwards on track, the championship came down to a battle between Bodine and Larry Pearson. Bodine briefly lead the standings after the season's 28th race, and with three races to go (Hickory, Rockingham, and Martinsville) trailed by twelve points. Bodine qualified on the pole at Hickory but the race was cancelled because, allegedly, the promoter did not want to pay the purse and intentionally damaged the track which cost Bodine the chance to gain ground on Pearson. At the season finale, Bodine qualified on pole and won the race but ended up placing second to Pearson by just seven points in the final standings while totaling sixteen top-fives and 24 top-tens to go along with his series-best eight pole positions. Bodine was voted the series most popular driver at the conclusion of the season. In addition to his full time Busch Series schedule, He made four modified starts in 1986, winning two, both of which were NASCAR Modified National Championship events held at Martinsville. Bodine also made his NASCAR Winston Cup Series debut in 1986, driving the No. 2 Exxon Chevy in the Coca-Cola 600. Bodine started 32nd and finished eighteenth in the Rick Hendrick owned entry, earning the bonus money for being the highest finishing rookie driver.

Bodine again drove the full Busch series schedule in the No. 00 Oldsmobile in 1987. Although he failed to find victory lane, he accumulated five poles, eight top-fives, seventeen top-tens, and finished third in the championship. In May for the seventh Cup Series race of the season at North Wilksboro, Bodine was chosen to replace the injured Terry Labonte on the pace lap in Junior Johnson's No. 11 Budweiser Chevy. Despite starting from the rear of the field after the driver change, he managed to finish in eighth place. Bodine also replaced Labonte on the pace laps the next week at Bristol. Again starting from the rear of the field, Bodine ran as high as second and finished in ninth place. While Labonte is credited with the finishes due to the NASCAR rules regarding driver changes at the time, Bodine's success as a fill-in driver lead to a ride for fourteen Cup races in Hoss Ellington's part time No. 1 Bulls-Eye Barbecue Sauce Chevy. In Bodine's first event with the Ellington team, he qualified on pole for the Winston Open and placed sixth. He returned to Charlotte the next weekend and qualified ninth for the 600 and led seventeen laps (the first Cup laps lead of his career) but was collected in a wreck while running in the top-ten and eventually fell out of the race with an engine issue. At Daytona, Bodine qualified seventh, lead a lap, and finished a season-best eleventh, the first lead lap finish of his Cup career. For the season, he had five top-ten qualifying efforts in the No. 1 car and five top-twenty finishes.

== Moving up ==
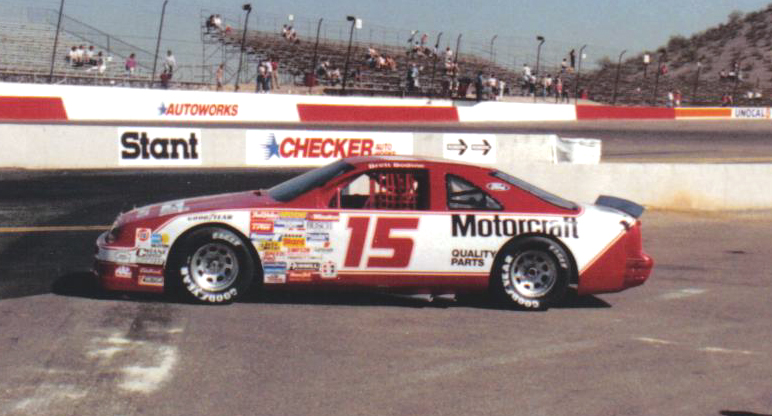
Bodine's 1989 Winston Cup car

In 1988, Bodine moved to the Cup Series full-time for Bud Moore Engineering driving the No. 15 Crisco Thunderbird. In the fourth race of the season at Atlanta, he qualified fifth and finished ninth, recording his first top-ten finish. In the Coca-Cola 600 at Charlotte, Bodine led the race five times for a total of 96 laps collecting both the half way leader bonus and the hard charger bonus money. His car dropped a cylinder late in the race and he held on to finish fourth (the first top-five finish of his career). In the Oakwood Homes 500, also at Charlotte, Bodine led the race three times for a total of fifty laps before getting passed for the lead by race winner Rusty Wallace with twelve laps to go and ultimately finishing third. The team was plagued by engine issues all season, falling out of races seven times while fighting through engine issues in others. For the season Bodine posted five top-ten finishes and finished twentieth in points. He was not eligible for the Rookie of the Year award in 1988 (which was won by Ken Bouchard who finished 25th in points with one top-ten) as he had run too many races as a part-time driver in 1987.

Bodine returned to Bud Moore's team in 1989 driving the No. 15 Motorcraft Ford. He recorded a top-five finish at Michigan and a total of six top-tens, moving up one spot to finish the season nineteenth in points. He also placed second in the Winston Open, just missing out on making the All-Star Race. Overall, Bodine's performance improved in his sophomore campaign as his average finished improved by three spots. Late in the 1989 season, Bodine made the decision to leave Bud Moore's team due to that team's sponsorship uncertainty for the 1990 season. He also had disagreements with Bud Moore on the type of chassis that the team was using (rear steer vs. front steer).

Bodine's breakout season came in 1990 driving the No. 26 Quaker State Buick Regal for champion drag racer Kenny Bernstein and crew chief Larry McReynolds. Bodine won his first Cup Series race in the 7th race of the season at North Wilkesboro Speedway, which came under some controversy as some felt that Darrell Waltrip was robbed of the win. Brett had led 63 laps in the middle of the race and then re-took the lead on lap 318 after short pitting on a round of green flag pit stops. When the caution came out on lap 321, the pace car mistakenly picked up Dale Earnhardt as the race leader, putting Bodine almost a full lap in front of the entire field. During the ensuing confusion of a seventeen lap caution flag (NASCAR did not have electronic scoring at the time) Bodine was able to make a pit stop for fresh tires without losing any positions. When NASCAR reset the lineup with Bodine as the leader, he led the final 83 laps of the race (a race-high 146 laps overall) to take the victory. "We messed up," said Chip Williams, NASCAR's public relations director. "By throwing the caution on the second-place car, it kept Bodine in the lead. He slipped into the pits and came out without losing the lead because the pace car was keeping the second-place car back. We messed up by picking up the wrong car. It was a judgment call, and you can't overrule a judgment call." Despite the controversy, the win stood and would prove to be Bodine's only career Cup series win, the final Cup Series win for Buick, the final win for Bernstein's team, the first oval win for Larry McReynolds, and the only oval track victory for Bernstein's team. From Dover in 1989 through Talladega in 1990, Bodine was running at the finish of sixteen consecutive races, the longest streak in the Cup Series at the time. Bodine made his first appearance in the All-Star race in 1990 and won his first pole position at the fall event at Charlotte Motor Speedway. At the conclusion of 1990, Bodine was a career-best twelfth in the championship standings with five top-five finishes (both Wilksboro races, Pocono, Watkins Glen, and Martinsville) and a total of nine top-ten finishes.

After having improved his average finish in each of his Cup seasons to date Brett returned to the King Racing No. 26 car in 1991 with high hopes. Unfortunately, crew chief McReynolds left the team after the season's fourth race at Atlanta to join Davey Allison at Robert Yates Racing. McReynolds was replaced by Clyde Booth. In the season's seventh race, Bodine had a strong run in his attempt to win back to back First Union 400s at North Wilksboro. He started from the pole position and lead 103 of the race's first 218 laps. On lap 219, as the race leader, Bodine was wrecked by the lapped car of Ricky Rudd on a restart, ending his day. Even with the crew chief change and the wreck at Wilksboro, Bodine was fifteenth in points after placing eleventh in the ninth race of the season. However, the 26 team struggled with reliability issues for the remainder of 1991, falling out of ten of the season's final twenty races due to engine failures. Bodine managed a strong run at the fall Martinsville race, leading a total of 59 laps from the second starting position before getting passed for the lead by race winner Harry Gant with 47 laps to go and finishing second. Bodine made his second consecutive appearance in the All-Star race in 1991. For the season Brett had two top-five (both at Martinsville) and six top-ten finishes but the reliability issues pushed the team down to nineteenth in the championship standings.

For 1992, the No. 26 team switched from Buick to Ford and Donnie Richeson, Brett's brother in law at the time, came on as the team's crew chief. Bodine won the poll at Dover and recorded top five finishes at Darlington and Martinsville. In the spring race at Martinsville, he qualified third and took the race lead with 36 laps remaining but a broken rear axle with 27 laps remaining dropped him to eighth place, two laps down, at the finish. In the fall race at Martinsville, Bodine led a total of 65 laps before getting passed for the lead by race winner Geoff Bodine with 43 laps to go and finishing third. From Sonoma through Phoenix in 1992, he was running at the finish of seventeen consecutive races, tied for the longest streak in the Cup Series at the time. Brett also qualified on pole and finished sixth in the Winston Open. For the season, Bodine totaled a career-best thirteen top-ten finishes, a career best average start of 8.1 (2nd best in the Cup series for 92), and a career best average finish of 15.4 en route to fifteenth place in the overall standings.

1993 saw Bodine register pole positions at Wilksboro and Michigan, a runner-up finish in the Southern 500 at Darlington, additional top five finishes at Pocono and Richmond, and a total of nine top-ten finishes. He also finished third in the Winston Open to qualify for the All Star Race for the third time and placed a career-best tenth in that race. Bodine crashed in qualifying for Dover and was forced to miss the race due to a broken wrist and a small brain bruise. He returned to race again the next week at Martinsville and placed twentieth in the championship standings.

In 1994 Bodine finished 2nd in the season opening Busch Clash. Bodine had his best race of the season in the inaugural Brickyard 400 running in the top-five throughout the race, leading ten laps, and placing second (His fifth career second place finish) after infamously tangling with brother Geoff while battling for the lead in the second half of the race. For the season Brett recorded a total of six top-ten finishes, and ended up nineteenth in the championship standings. In his five seasons driving the No. 26 Quaker State car, Bodine posted a total of five poles, one win, thirteen top-fives, and 43 top-tens while finishing no worse than twentieth in the final standings.

For 1995, he signed with Junior Johnson piloting the Lowe's Ford Thunderbird with crew chief Mike Beam. The team had been dominate on the restrictor plate tracks in past years and the No. 11 car was again fast in Daytona 500 practice. Things took a bad turn when the team was found with an illegal engine manifold during pre-qualifying inspection at Daytona, resulting in a then-record $45,100 fine. The revised engine was not nearly as fast and the team needed a provisional to make the race. Amid rumors of Johnson selling his team, Mike Beam left following the tenth race of the season and took all but two crew members with him. Bodine continued on as the driver with Dean Combs coming on as crew chief, managing top-ten finishes at Wilksboro and Pocono, and finished twentieth in points. 1995 would be Bodine's eighth consecutive top-twenty season in the Cup Series. Bodine easily bested the performance of his Junior Johnson Racing teammate, the No. 27 car driven primarily by Elton Sawyer, which placed 37th in points with five DNQs and no top-tens in 1995.

== Owner/driver ==
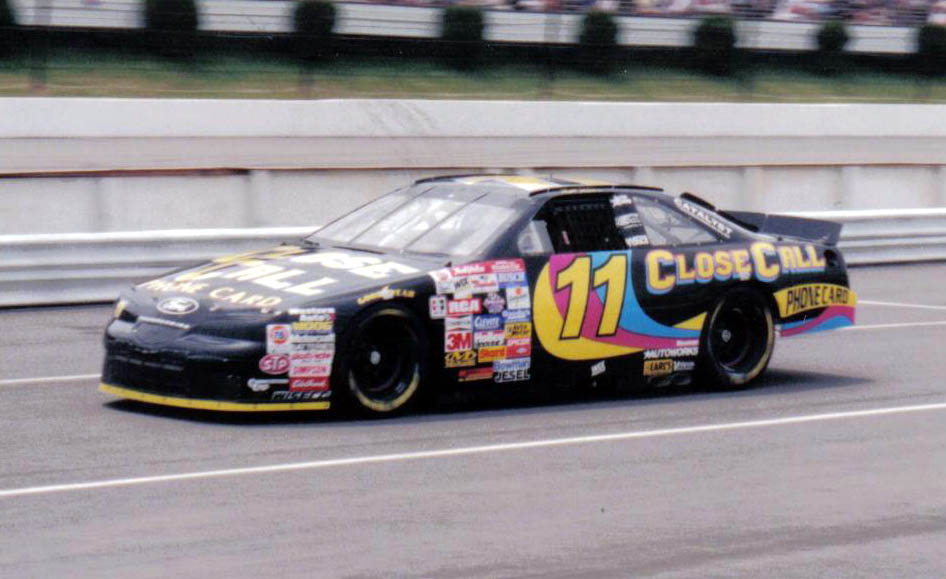
1997 car

After the 1995 season, Johnson sold the team to Bodine and his wife Diane to form Brett Bodine Racing. In a unique arrangement, the Lowes sponsorship ($4.2 million) for 1996 was paid directly to Johnson to purchase the team while Bodine ran the team out of his pocket for the inaugural season. Bodine was reunited with crew chief Donnie Richeson and scored a top-ten finish at Daytona in July, but failed to qualify for a late season race at Martinsville while placing 24th in the standings with eight top-twenty finishes. Bodine's struggles as a first time owner/driver during the 1996 season were documented in the book Wide Open

After Lowe's left to become the sponsor for Mike Skinner at Richard Childress Racing, he signed Catalyst Communications as a primary sponsor to a three-year, $15 million deal for 1997 and beyond. The 1997 season started well for the No. 11 Close Call Ford with top tens at Bristol and Sonoma and a total of six top-twenties in the first nine races. This strong start propelled Bodine to sixteenth in the points standings. Troubles erupted when Catalyst stopped paying its sponsorship fees, leading to a lawsuit, with Bodine eventually removing all sponsorship decals from the car. The lack of funding took its toll on the team as Bodine failed to qualify for a late season race at Rockingham and the team slipped all the way down to 29th in the final standings, although his final position was still better than the new Lowe's team which placed thirtieth with driver Mike Skinner.

For 1998, Bodine found reliable sponsorship from Paychex and his Ford Taurus, although the $3 million per year deal was significantly less than that of top teams. He qualified for every race for the first time as an owner/driver, collected eleven top-twenties finishes with a season's best eleventh-place finish at Bristol and Talladega, and placed 25th in the final standings. Bodine was running at the finish of the first 23 races of the 1998 season, tied for the longest streak to start the season. Paychex returned in 1999, but Bodine was unable to carry the momentum of the previous year and slipped to 35th in the standings with just three top-twenty finishes, including a season's best twelfth at Bristol, while failing to qualify for two races.

Bodine signed Ralphs Supermarkets to sponsor his car for 2000, and sold half the team to businessman Richard Hilton. The latter deal fell through, but while he was still able to keep Ralphs as a sponsor, the failed buy-out put the team behind in its preparation for the season. Bodine struggled and failed to qualify for five of the season's first 21 races, falling all the way to fortieth in the point standings. Things started to improve after Mike Hillman came on as crew chief mid-season. Bodine qualified for the season's final thirteen races with four top-twenty finishes, including a season's best fourteenth at Homestead, and finished the season 35th in points. Bodine also set the track record at Indianapolis Motor Speedway during second round qualifying for the Brickyard 400. This track record would stand until Tony Stewart went faster during qualifying in 2002. He also became the first Cup series driver to start wearing the HANS device in 2000.

== Sole survivor ==
By 2001, Bodine was the last full-time owner/driver in the NASCAR Cup Series. Previously common, single-car owner/driver teams had become uncompetitive as NASCAR grew more reliant on engineering, data, and sponsorship. Darrell Waltrip’s No. 17 team, once in the top-ten, fell to 29th in 1996, leading him to sell mid-1998 after ongoing struggles. Ricky Rudd’s No. 10 team dropped from sixth in 1996 to 31st in 1999, prompting a sale after that season. Bill Elliott’s No. 94 team fell from eighth in 1995 and 1997 to 21st in 1999, and he sold after a poor 2000 season. Geoff Bodine’s No. 7 team similarly declined from 16th in 1995 to 27th in 1998, leading to a sale.

Ralphs returned as the primary sponsor, and Bodine added RedCell Batteries as a major associate for 2001. The No. 11 Ford, with Mike Hillman as crew chief, qualified for every race, secured top-ten finishes at Daytona and Loudon, nine top-twenty finishes, and moved up to 30th in the final standings. When RedCell stopped paying mid-season, Bodine signed Wells Fargo as a new associate sponsor. Brett had a streak of 31 consecutive races finished, the longest in the Cup Series, from Charlotte in 2000 through Darlington in 2001. Brett Bodine Racing expanded to two cars, adding the No. 09 Ford for older brother Geoff, who raced twice with a best finish of 27th. Brett also entered the Xfinity Series, qualifying in one of two races with nephew Josh Richeson. Ralphs did not renew sponsorship for the following season.

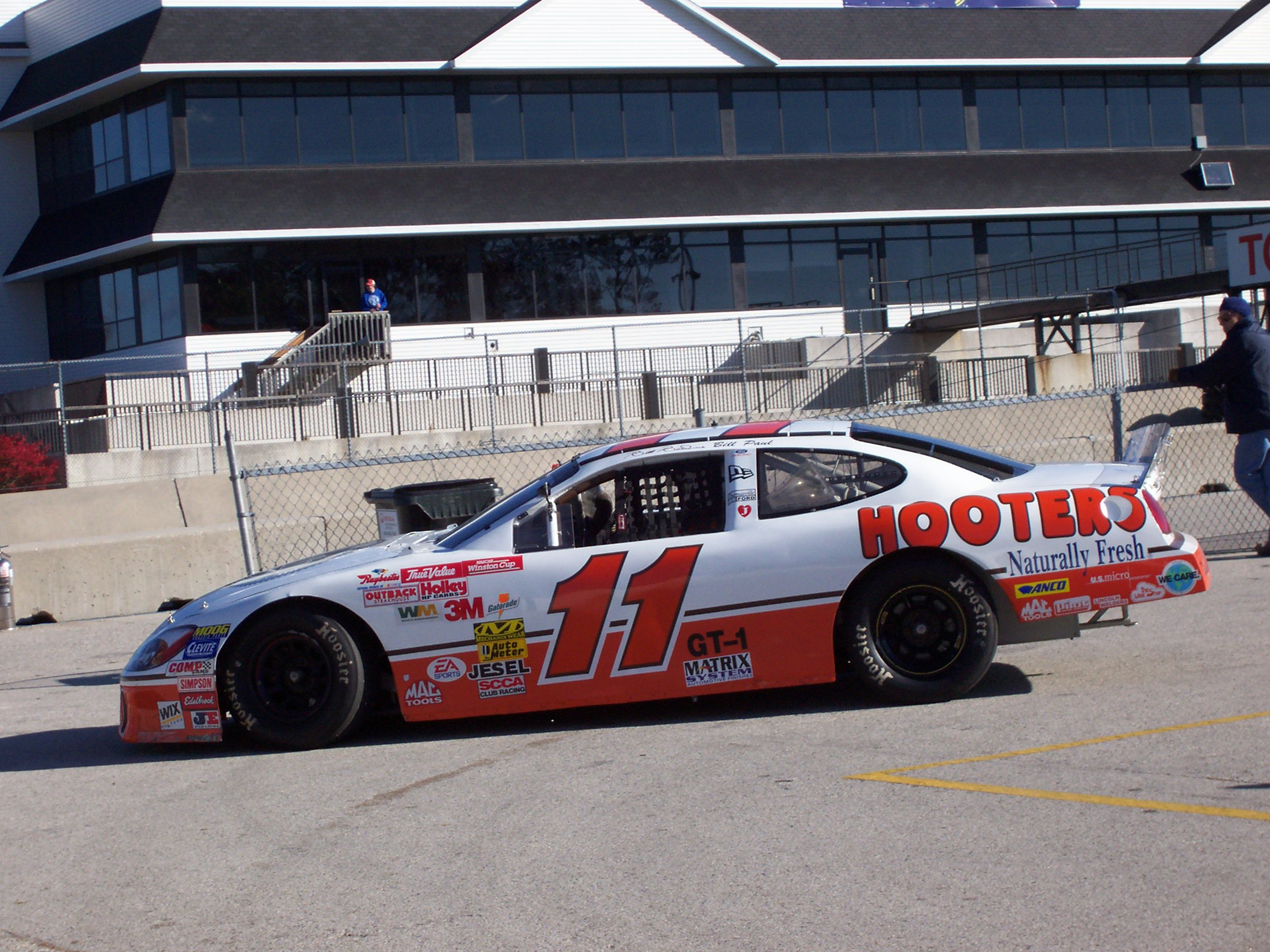
Hooters car

With no major sponsors, Bodine received support from minor backers like Wells Fargo, Timberland Pro, and Dura Lube. Three races into the season, Hooters came on board, but the team was still behind in development. Crew chief Mike Hillman and others had left, concerned about funding for the full season. Bodine had four top-twenty finishes, including a season-best thirteenth at Talladega, but failed to qualify for four late-season races, finishing 36th in points. He also fielded an Xfinity team in nine races (qualifying for seven) for his nephew Josh Richeson, with a best finish of 28th.

In 2003, Hooters returned with reduced funding. With no major sponsors, Bodine planned a limited schedule, attempting nine races and qualifying for six in his No. 11 Ford. He also drove the No. 57 CLR Ford for Ted Campbell at Darlington. His best finish was 24th at Bristol, with a special paint scheme marking ten years since Alan Kulwicki's plane crash. Bodine placed fourth in the Winston Open, narrowly missing the All-Star race. Early in the season, Bodine faced a challenging divorce from his wife, team co-owner Diane, which led him to file a restraining order against her. Just before the Michigan race, Hooters pulled its sponsorship from the Bodine racing team. That weekend, Bodine was seriously injured in a practice accident after hitting debris that cut a front tire, causing a crash that left him with a broken collarbone and damaged teeth. Geoff Bodine replaced him in the final race for the No. 11 Hooters car.

After recovering, Brett attempted a comeback with Morgan-McClure Motorsports, but the car failed to qualify. With no major sponsors and most of his team laid off, Bodine tried to qualify at Indy with a fan-funded "Brick Car" and additional support from US Micro Corporation. Though his qualifying lap tied Dale Earnhardt Jr. for 36th, Bodine missed the field due to a tiebreaker favoring Earnhardt based on points.

Rumors of a sponsor for 2004 and beyond surfaced, but nothing materialized, and the team was sold. Unable to secure a sponsor or a ride with another team, Bodine retired. Over his eighteen-year Winston Cup career, he started 480 races, earning five poles, one win, sixteen top-fives, 61 top-tens, and over $13 million in prize money. In the Busch Series, Bodine started 77 races, with sixteen poles, five wins, 31 top-fives, and 52 top-tens. He led more than 1,000 laps in both series, with 1,194 laps led in Busch and 1,040 in Cup. In modifieds, he achieved five wins on NASCAR's modified tour, earning a spot among NASCAR's 50 greatest modified drivers.

== To the NASCAR office ==
Bodine went to work for NASCAR in 2004 as the director of cost research at the R&D center, working as a liaison between NASCAR and the race teams on cost reduction efforts. He also did all of the driving for NASCAR's Car of Tomorrow prototype. While continuing to work in the R&D center on projects including the Touring Series Spec Engine and the Xfinity Series Composite Body, Bodine drove the Cup Series pace car on race day from 2004 to 2018. Currently, he works as the chairman of the Driver Approval Committee.

== Motorsports career results ==
=== NASCAR ===
(key) (Bold – Pole position awarded by qualifying time. Italics – Pole position earned by points standings or practice time. * – Most laps led.)

==== Winston Cup Series ====
NASCAR Winston Cup Series results
Year	Team	No.	Make	1	2	3	4	5	6	7	8	9	10	11	12	13	14	15	16	17	18	19	20	21	22	23	24	25	26	27	28	29	30	31	32	33	34	35	36	NWCC	Pts	Ref
1986	Hendrick Motorsports	2	Chevy	DAY	RCH	CAR	ATL	BRI	DAR	NWS	MAR	TAL	DOV	CLT; 18	RSD	POC	MCH	DAY	POC	TAL	GLN	MCH	BRI	DAR	RCH	DOV	MAR	NWS	CLT	CAR	ATL	RSD								92nd	109	
1987	Ellington Racing	1	Chevy	DAY	CAR	RCH	ATL	DAR	NWS	BRI	MAR	TAL	CLT; 21	DOV; 14	POC; 34	RSD; 38	MCH; 22		POC; 22	TAL; 38	GLN	MCH; 21	BRI	DAR; 20	RCH	DOV; 13	MAR	NWS	CLT; 32	CAR; 41	RSD	ATL; 15								32nd	1271	
1987	Ellington Racing	1	Buick															DAY; 11																						32nd	1271	
1988	Bud Moore Engineering	15	Ford	DAY; 35	RCH; 27	CAR; 27	ATL; 9	DAR; 15	BRI; 17	NWS; 13	MAR; 27	TAL; 19	CLT; 4	DOV; 31	RSD; 40	POC; 35	MCH; 27	DAY; 42	POC; 20	TAL; 28	GLN; 23	MCH; 6	BRI; 25	DAR; 17	RCH; 11	DOV; 22	MAR; 10	CLT; 3	NWS; 17	CAR; 29	PHO; 43	ATL; 27								20th	2828	
1989	Bud Moore Engineering	15	Ford	DAY; 29	CAR; 34	ATL; 33	RCH; 28	DAR; 14	BRI; 30	NWS; 28	MAR; 27	TAL; 19	CLT; 8	DOV; 15	SON; 27	POC; 10	MCH; 5	DAY; 11	POC; 10	TAL; 14	GLN; 15	MCH; 36	BRI; 17	DAR; 16	RCH; 34	DOV; 9	MAR; 7	CLT; 12	NWS; 17	CAR; 21	PHO; 19	ATL; 23								19th	3051	
1990	King Racing	26	Buick	DAY; 17	RCH; 8	CAR; 25	ATL; 11	DAR; 8	BRI; 22	NWS; 1*	MAR; 12	TAL; 12	CLT; 29	DOV; 18	SON; 41	POC; 4	MCH; 14	DAY; 22	POC; 16	TAL; 33	GLN; 3	MCH; 17	BRI; 25	DAR; 10	RCH; 31	DOV; 20	MAR; 4	NWS; 3	**CLT**; 8	CAR; 17	PHO; 15	ATL; 18								12th	3440	
1991	King Racing	26	Buick	DAY; 22	RCH; 24	CAR; 13	ATL; 15	DAR; 16	BRI; 22	**NWS**; 30*	MAR; 4	TAL; 11	CLT; 28	DOV; 33	SON; 11	POC; 33	MCH; 36	DAY; 36	POC; 8	TAL; 32	GLN; 25	MCH; 37	BRI; 10	DAR; 14	RCH; 18	DOV; 32	MAR; 2	NWS; 7	CLT; 8	CAR; 30	PHO; 14	ATL; 29								19th	2980	
1992	King Racing	26	Ford	DAY; 41	CAR; 8	RCH; 33	ATL; 20	DAR; 6	BRI; 11	NWS; 10	MAR; 8	TAL; 16	CLT; 20	**DOV**; 30	SON; 15	POC; 8	MCH; 19	DAY; 12	POC; 8	TAL; 10	GLN; 10	MCH; 12	BRI; 9	DAR; 4	RCH; 18	DOV; 22	MAR; 3	NWS; 7	CLT; 28	CAR; 7	PHO; 12	ATL; 40								15th	3491	
1993	King Racing	26	Ford	DAY; 17	CAR; 22	RCH; 32	ATL; 8	DAR; 12	BRI; 9	**NWS**; 17	MAR; 7	TAL; 30	SON; 24	CLT; 41	DOV; 16	POC; 29	**MCH**; 39	DAY; 19	NHA; 13	POC; 5	TAL; 9	GLN; 20	MCH; 14	BRI; 7	DAR; 2	RCH; 5	DOV	MAR; 6	NWS; 21	CLT; 15	CAR; 35	PHO; 28	ATL; 40							20th	3183	
1994	King Racing	26	Ford	DAY; 32	CAR; 6	RCH; 8	ATL; 31	DAR; 36	BRI; 13	NWS; 23	MAR; 24	TAL; 17	SON; 13	CLT; 42	DOV; 32	POC; 8	MCH; 32	DAY; 16	NHA; 12	POC; 35	TAL; 17	IND; 2	GLN; 28	MCH; 12	BRI; 14	DAR; 29	RCH; 8	DOV; 26	MAR; 30	NWS; 33	CLT; 6	CAR; 18	PHO; 13	ATL; 36						19th	3159	
1995	Junior Johnson & Associates	11	Ford	DAY; 25	CAR; 14	RCH; 18	ATL; 23	DAR; 12	BRI; 27	NWS; 9	MAR; 11	TAL; 30	SON; 29	CLT; 35	DOV; 21	POC; 10	MCH; 40	DAY; 20	NHA; 21	POC; 15	TAL; 28	IND; 24	GLN; 16	MCH; 36	BRI; 28	DAR; 31	RCH; 16	DOV; 17	MAR; 22	NWS; 22	CLT; 27	CAR; 27	PHO; 17	ATL; 20						20th	2988	
1996	Brett Bodine Racing	11	Ford	DAY; 32	CAR; 28	RCH; 25	ATL; 24	DAR; 27	BRI; 20	NWS; 23	MAR; 18	TAL; 23	SON; 20	CLT; 24	DOV; 24	POC; 40	MCH; 22	DAY; 9	NHA; 16	POC; 27	TAL; 22	IND; 22	GLN; 14	MCH; 28	BRI; 14	DAR; 28	RCH; 25	DOV; 27	MAR; DNQ	NWS; 23	CLT; 28	CAR; 16	PHO; 26	ATL; 21						24th	2814	
1997	Brett Bodine Racing	11	Ford	DAY; 18	CAR; 17	RCH; 23	ATL; 18	DAR; 35	TEX; 19	BRI; 10	MAR; 27	SON; 6	TAL; 33	CLT; 26	DOV; 33	POC; 25	MCH; 19	CAL; 26	DAY; 23	NHA; 42	POC; 29	IND; 18	GLN; 39	MCH; 31	BRI; 31	DAR; 15	RCH; 21	NHA; 33	DOV; 26	MAR; 17	CLT; 30	TAL; 22	CAR; DNQ	PHO; 33	ATL; 41					29th	2716	
1998	Brett Bodine Racing	11	Ford	DAY; 24	CAR; 16	LVS; 26	ATL; 26	DAR; 22	BRI; 11	TEX; 16	MAR; 13	TAL; 11	CAL; 28	CLT; 22	DOV; 16	RCH; 20	MCH; 33	POC; 18	SON; 32	NHA; 28	POC; 38	IND; 33	GLN; 34	MCH; 32	BRI; 26	NHA; 30	DAR; 42	RCH; 19	DOV; 22	MAR; 34	CLT; 19	TAL; 13	DAY; 25	PHO; 43	CAR; 31	ATL; 31				25th	2907	
1999	Brett Bodine Racing	11	Ford	DAY; 22	CAR; 33	LVS; 20	ATL; 33	DAR; 30	TEX; 18	BRI; 22	MAR; 14	TAL; 43	CAL; 28	RCH; 38	CLT; 22	DOV; 37	MCH; 30	POC; 26	SON; 31	DAY; 34	NHA; 31	POC; 26	IND; DNQ	GLN; 40	MCH; DNQ	BRI; 12	DAR; 26	RCH; 31	NHA; 29	DOV; 29	MAR; 42	CLT; 27	TAL; 31	CAR; 43	PHO; 42	HOM; 40	ATL; 30			35th	2351	
2000	Brett Bodine Racing	11	Ford	DAY; DNQ	CAR; 35	LVS; DNQ	ATL; 16	DAR; 27	BRI; 22	TEX; 23	MAR; 36	TAL; DNQ	CAL; 41	RCH; 38	CLT; 30	DOV; 28	MCH; 36	POC; 32	SON; 30	DAY; DNQ	NHA; 20	POC; 30	IND; 39	GLN; DNQ	MCH; 42	BRI; 28	DAR; 27	RCH; 35	NHA; 42	DOV; 20	MAR; 41	CLT; 32	TAL; 26	CAR; 26	PHO; 20	HOM; 14	ATL; 28			35th	2145	
2001	Brett Bodine Racing	11	Ford	DAY; 15	CAR; 27	LVS; 38	ATL; 26	DAR; 36	BRI; 27	TEX; 28	MAR; 36	TAL; 26	CAL; 27	RCH; 39	CLT; 17	DOV; 25	MCH; 33	POC; 37	SON; 13	DAY; 9	CHI; 19	NHA; 13	POC; 33	IND; 37	GLN; 13	MCH; 40	BRI; 26	DAR; 27	RCH; 43	DOV; 28	KAN; 25	CLT; 28	MAR; 40	TAL; 12	PHO; 26	CAR; 35	HOM; 32	ATL; 36	NHA; 8	30th	2948	
2002	Brett Bodine Racing	11	Ford	DAY; 16	CAR; 30	LVS; 35	ATL; 38	DAR; 38	BRI; 36	TEX; 38	MAR; 26	TAL; 13	CAL; 23	RCH; 19	CLT; 27	DOV; 34	POC; 24	MCH; 34	SON; 24	DAY; 38	CHI; 30	NHA; 27	POC; 33	IND; 42	GLN; 32	MCH; 38	BRI; 32	DAR; 39	RCH; 20	NHA; 36	DOV; DNQ	KAN; DNQ	TAL; 29	CLT; 26	MAR; 38	ATL; 34	CAR; 36	PHO; DNQ	HOM; DNQ	36th	2276	
2003	Brett Bodine Racing	11	Ford	DAY; DNQ	CAR	LVS	ATL; 41		BRI; 24	TEX; 31	TAL; DNQ	MAR	CAL	RCH; 31	CLT; DNQ	DOV; 42	POC	MCH; INQ^{†}	SON	DAY	CHI	NHA		IND; DNQ	GLN	MCH	BRI	DAR	RCH	NHA	DOV	TAL	KAN	CLT	MAR	ATL	PHO	CAR	HOM	52nd	308	
2003	Team CLR	57	Ford					DAR; 31																																52nd	308	
2003	Morgan-McClure Motorsports	4	Pontiac																				POC; DNQ																	52nd	308	
^{†} - Qualified but replaced by Geoff Bodine

===== Daytona 500 =====
Year	Team	Manufacturer	Start	Finish
1988	Bud Moore Engineering	Ford	41	35
1989	Bud Moore Engineering	Ford	18	29
1990	King Racing	Buick	33	17
1991	King Racing	Buick	41	22
1992	King Racing	Ford	18	41
1993	King Racing	Ford	20	17
1994	King Racing	Ford	10	32
1995	Junior Johnson & Associates	Ford	39	25
1996	Brett Bodine Racing	Ford	41	32
1997	Brett Bodine Racing	Ford	37	18
1998	Brett Bodine Racing	Ford	42	24
1999	Brett Bodine Racing	Ford	40	22
2000	Brett Bodine Racing	Ford	DNQ	
2001	Brett Bodine Racing	Ford	43	15
2002	Brett Bodine Racing	Ford	27	16
2003	Brett Bodine Racing	Ford	DNQ	

==== Busch Series ====
NASCAR Busch Series results
Year	Team	No.	Make	1	2	3	4	5	6	7	8	9	10	11	12	13	14	15	16	17	18	19	20	21	22	23	24	25	26	27	28	29	30	31	32	NBGNC	Pts	Ref
1985	Hendrick Motorsports	15	Pontiac	DAY	CAR	HCY	BRI; 12																													23rd	1438	
1985	Hendrick Motorsports	5	Pontiac					MAR; 1	DAR	SBO; 4	LGY	DOV	CLT; 4	SBO; 3	HCY; 2	ROU	**IRP**; 25*	SBO	LGY	HCY; 9	MLW	BRI; 1*	DAR; 8	RCH	NWS	ROU	CLT; 9	HCY	**CAR**; 1*	**MAR**; 27						23rd	1438	
1986	Thomas Brothers Racing	00	Olds	DAY; 23	**CAR**; 24	HCY; 8	**MAR**; 20	BRI; 19	DAR; 3	SBO; 8	LGY; 10	JFC; 6	**DOV**; 3	CLT; 2	SBO; 5	HCY; 3	ROU; 6	IRP; 26	SBO; 22	RAL; 6	OXF; 7	SBO; 2	**HCY**; 2*	LGY; 2	ROU; 3	**BRI**; 1*	DAR; 3	**RCH**; 19	DOV; 3	MAR; 4	**ROU**; 3*	CLT; 7	CAR; 5	**MAR**; 1		2nd	4507	
1987	Thomas Brothers Racing	00	Olds	DAY; 4	**HCY**; 5	**MAR**; 19	DAR; 3	BRI; 10	**LGY**; 6	SBO; 2	**CLT**; 30	DOV; 23	IRP; 4	ROU; 24	JFC; 8	OXF; 11	SBO; 4	HCY; 6	RAL; 10	LGY; 8	ROU; 24	BRI; 13	JFC; 7	DAR; 16	RCH; 29	DOV; 6	**MAR**; 5*	CLT; 10	CAR; 25	MAR; 3						3rd	3560	
1992	H&H Motorsports	26	Chevy	DAY	CAR	RCH	ATL	MAR	DAR	BRI	HCY	LAN	DUB	NZH	CLT	DOV	ROU	MYB	GLN; 28	VOL	NHA	TAL	IRP	ROU	MCH	NHA	BRI	DAR	RCH	DOV	CLT	MAR	CAR	HCY		118th	79	
1993	H&H Motorsports	26	Chevy	DAY	CAR	RCH	DAR	BRI	HCY	ROU	MAR	NZH	CLT	DOV	MYB	GLN; 28	MLW	TAL	IRP	MCH	NHA	BRI	DAR	RCH	DOV	ROU	CLT	MAR	CAR	HCY	ATL					98th	79	
1999	Keystone Motorsports	54	Chevy	DAY	CAR	LVS	ATL	DAR	TEX; 33	NSV	BRI	TAL	CAL; DNQ	NHA	RCH	NZH	CLT; 6	DOV	SBO	GLN	MLW	MYB	PPR	GTY	IRP	MCH; 18	BRI	DAR	RCH; DNQ	DOV	CLT; DNQ	CAR; 15	MEM	PHO	HOM	69th	387	
2000	Labonte Motorsports	44	Chevy	DAY	CAR	LVS	ATL	DAR	BRI	TEX	NSV	TAL	CAL	RCH	NHA	CLT	DOV	SBO	MYB	GLN	MLW	NZH	PPR	GTY	IRP	MCH; DNQ	BRI	DAR	RCH	DOV	CLT	CAR	MEM	PHO	HOM	NA	-	

==== Craftsman Truck Series ====
NASCAR Craftsman Truck Series results
Year	Team	No.	Make	1	2	3	4	5	6	7	8	9	10	11	12	13	14	15	16	17	18	19	20	21	22	23	24	25	26	27	NCTC	Pts	Ref
1997	Team Racing	11	Chevy	WDW	TUS	HOM	PHO	POR	EVG	I70	NHA	TEX	BRI	NZH	MLW	LVL	CNS	HPT	IRP	FLM	NSV	GLN	RCH	MAR	SON	MMR	CAL	PHO	LVS; DNQ		NA	-	
1998	Team Racing	11	Chevy	WDW; 32	HOM	PHO	POR	EVG	I70	GLN	TEX	BRI	MLW	NZH	CAL	PPR	IRP	NHA	FLM	NSV	HPT	LVL	RCH; 32	MEM	GTY						66th	192	
1998	Team Racing	71	Chevy																							MAR; 35	SON	MMR	PHO	LVS	66th	192	

=== ARCA Permatex SuperCar Series ===
(key) (Bold – Pole position awarded by qualifying time. Italics – Pole position earned by points standings or practice time. * – Most laps led.)

ARCA Permatex SuperCar Series results
Year	Team	No.	Make	1	2	3	4	5	6	7	8	9	10	11	12	13	14	15	16	APSC	Pts	Ref
1985	Hendrick Motorsports	5	Pontiac	ATL	DAY	ATL	TAL	ATL	SSP	**IRP**; 25*	CSP	FRS	IRP	OEF	ISF	DSF	TOL			75th	-	
1986	Hendrick Motorsports	15	Pontiac	**ATL**; 2	DAY	ATL	TAL	SIR	SSP	FRS	KIL	CSP	TAL	BLN	ISF	DSF	TOL	MCS	ATL	85th	-	
