= Arnot Art Museum =

Coordinates: 42.09079°N 76.80251°W

- U.S. Historic district – Contributing property
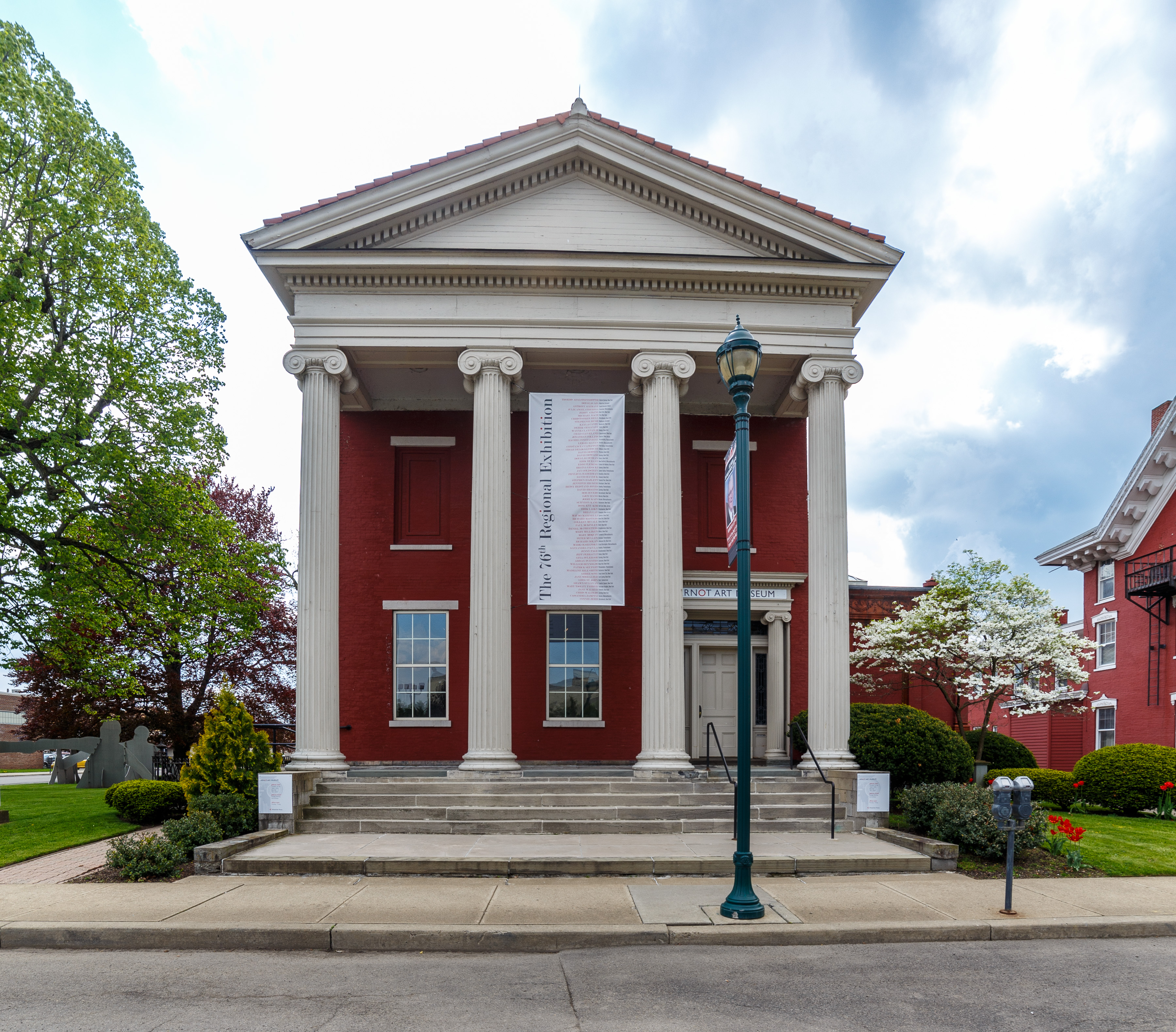
- Location: 235 Lake Street; Elmira, New York
- Built: 1833, 1890s, 1982
- Architectural style: Greek-Revival
- Website: http://www.arnotartmuseum.org/
- Part of: Elmira Civic Historic District (ID80002596)
- Designated CP: July 30, 1980

Arnot Art Museum, opened in 1913, is a municipal art museum located at 235 Lake Street in Elmira, New York. Its permanent collection includes 17th-, 18th-, and 19th-century European paintings; and 19th- and 20th-century American art. Its 21st-century collection focuses on contemporary representational art. The building is a contributing property in the Elmira Civic Historic District.

== Building ==
The museum was founded by banker Matthias Hallenback Arnot (1833–1910), who bequeathed to the City of Elmira his art collection and the building that housed it. The original Greek-Revival mansion was built in 1833 by his father, John Arnot, Sr. Matthias built the picture gallery addition in the 1890s, which featured extensive gas lighting and a large skylight. It is a rare example of a 19th-century private picture gallery that retains its original art collection.

A new wing was added to the museum in 1982.

== Collection ==
The European Art collection includes works by painters William-Adolphe Bouguereau, Jules Breton, Jan Brueghel the Elder, Gustave Courbet, Charles-François Daubigny, Anthonie de Lorme, Jean-Léon Gérôme, Claude Lorrain, and Jean-François Millet.

The American Art collection includes works by painters James Carroll Beckwith, George W Waters, Albert Bierstadt, Thomas Cole, Kenyon Cox, Jasper Francis Cropsey, Arthur B. Davies, Charles Warren Eaton, T. Alexander Harrison, William Stanley Haseltine, Robert Henri, George Inness, William Page, Ammi Phillips, Robert Street, Gilbert Stuart, Thomas Sully, Susan Waters, and minor Hudson River School artists. Sculptors represented include Anna Hyatt Huntington, Chauncey Ives, Frederick MacMonnies, Larkin G. Mead, Joseph Mozier, and John H. Rogers.

The collection also includes works by a number of Surrealist painters, including Jean Pierre Serrier.

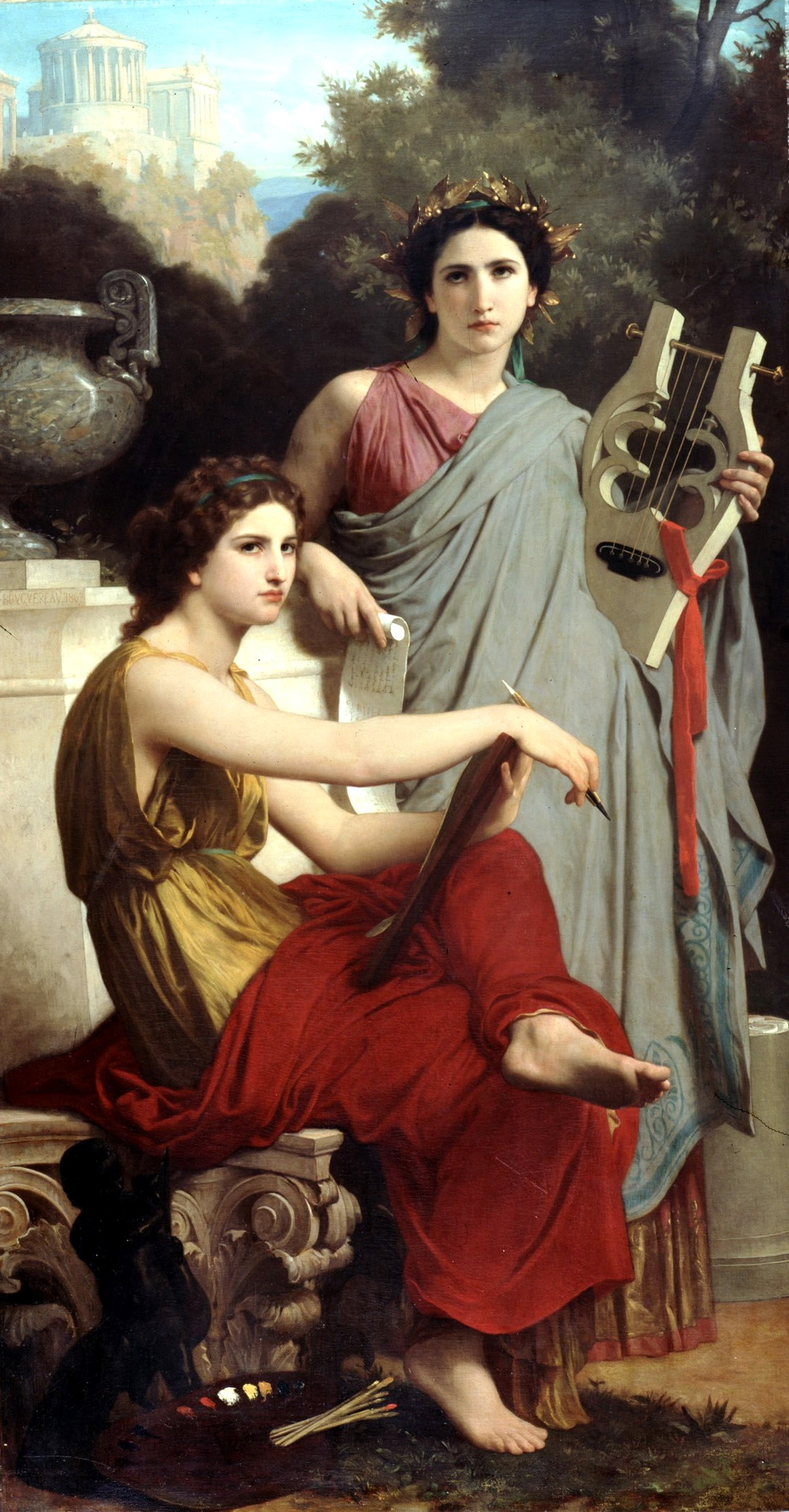
L'Art et la Littérature by William-Adolphe Bouguereau (1867).

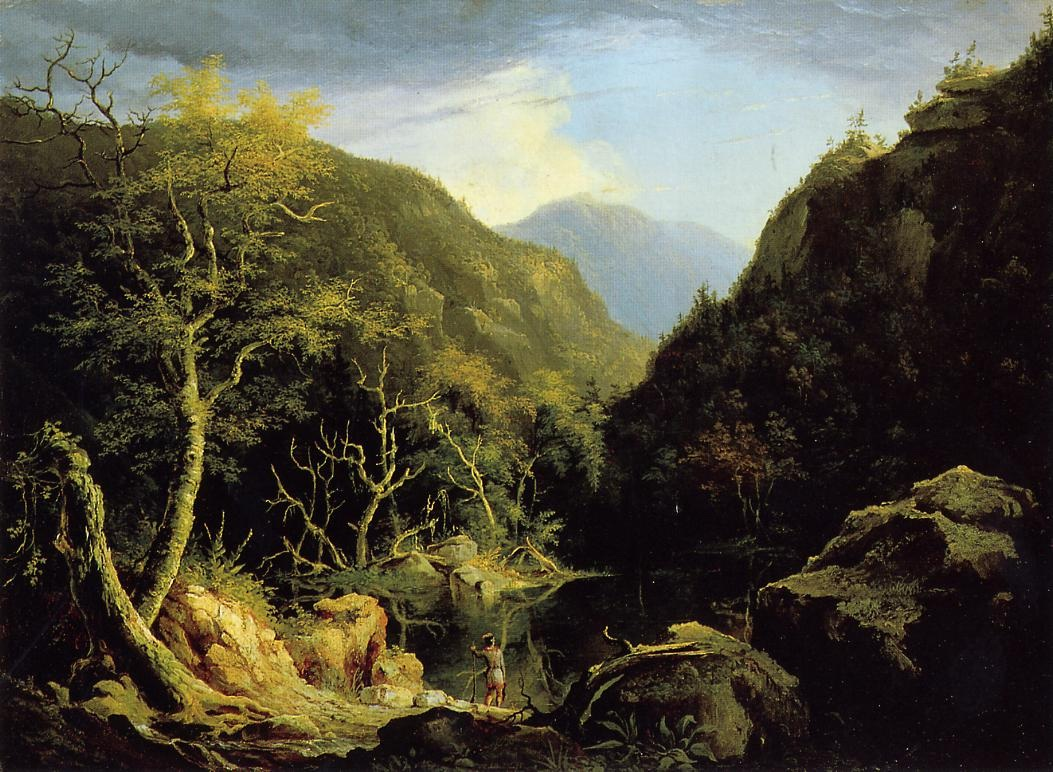
Autumn in the Catskills by Thomas Cole (1827).
