= Dr. Hovey Everett House =

Historic house in New York, United States

- U.S. National Register of Historic Places
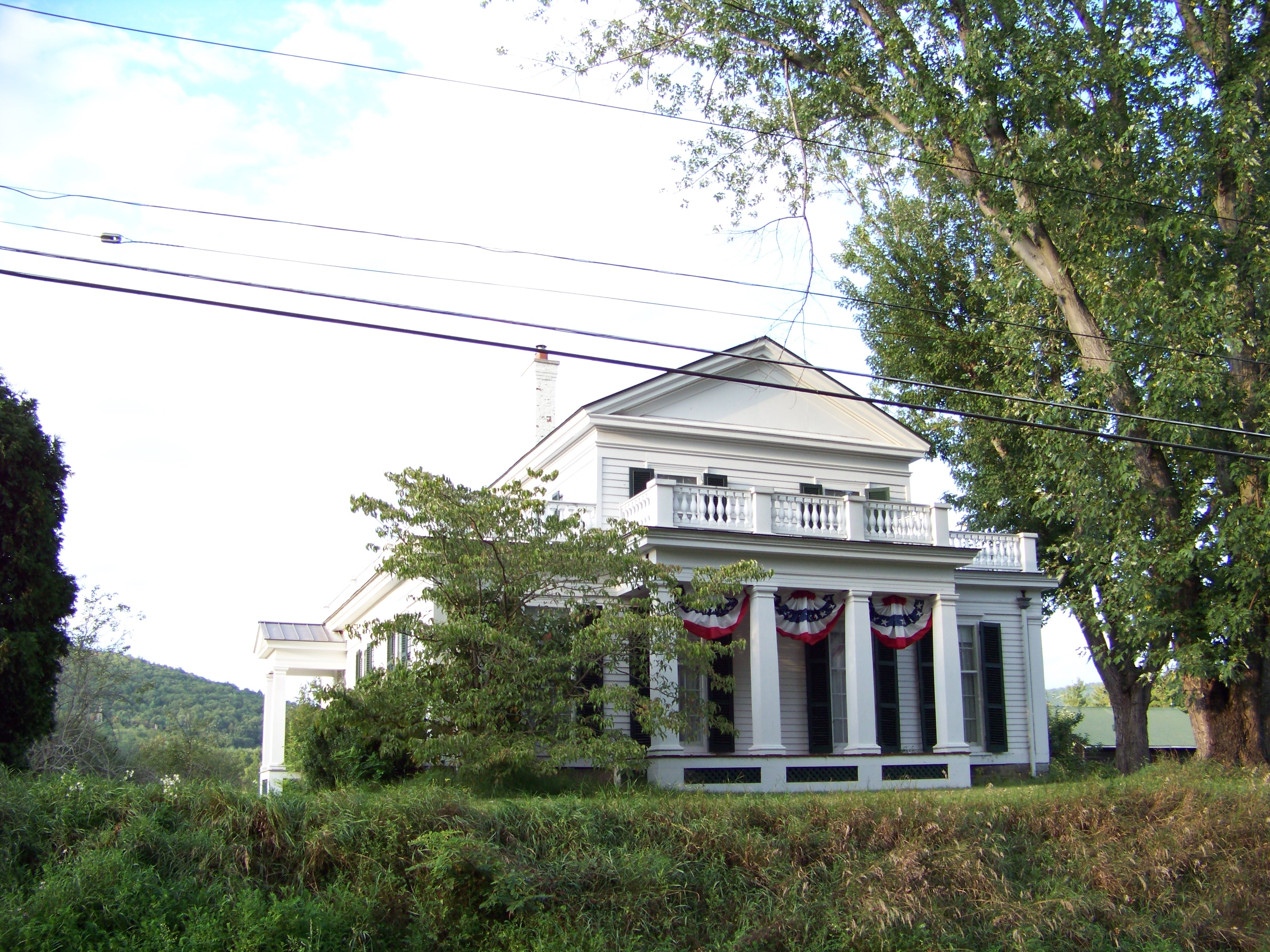
- Dr. Hovey Everett House, September 2008

- Location within New York Location within the United States
- Location: 1594 Cty Rte 60, Lowman, New York
- Coordinates: 42°3′39.35″N 76°45′29.35″W
- Area: 151 acres (61 ha)
- Built: 1827
- Architectural style: Greek Revival
- NRHP reference No.: 06001299
- Added to NRHP: January 25, 2007

The Dr. Hovey Everett House is a Greek Revival style house in the hamlet of Lowman in the town of Chemung, New York. It is significant both for its architecture and for its association with the life of Dr. Hovey Everett, who practised medicine in the area including Lowman and nearby Elmira, New York for forty years, from his arrival in the area in 1821 until his death in 1861. The house was built in 1827 as a wedding present for Dr. Everett upon his marriage to Cynthia Lowman, of the family for whom the town was named. The house and related buildings and structures were added to the National Register of Historic Places in 2007.

== Gallery ==
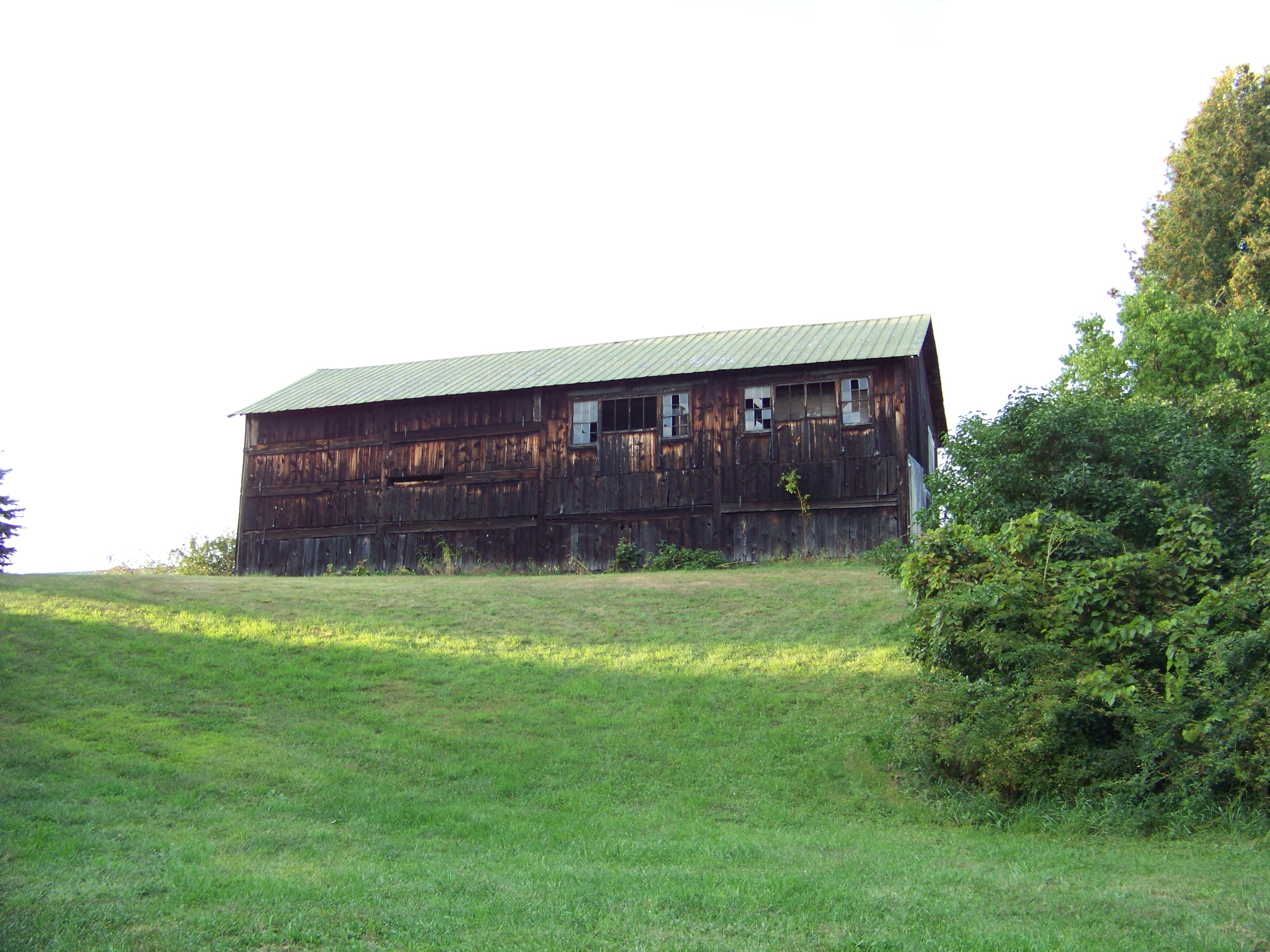
Barn on the Dr. Hovey Everett House property
