= Chemung, New York =

- Town
- Location within New York Location within the United States
- Coordinates: 42°2′11″N 76°37′40″W
- Country: United States
- State: New York
- County: Chemung

Government
  - Type: Town Council
  - Town Supervisor: George Richter (R)
  - Town Council: Members' List: • Marilyn Decker; • Jim Birney; • Todd Loper; • Walter L. Robbins, Jr.

Area
  - Total: 50.04 sq mi (129.60 km^{2})
  - Land: 49.48 sq mi (128.15 km^{2})
  - Water: 0.56 sq mi (1.45 km^{2})
- Elevation: 955 ft (291 m)

Population (2020)
  - Total: 2,368 ▼
  - Estimate (2021): 2,332
  - Density: 50.4/sq mi (19.46/km^{2})
- Time zone: UTC-5 (Eastern (EST))
  - Summer (DST): UTC-4 (EDT)
- ZIP Codes: 14825 (Chemung); 14859 (Lockwood); 14861 (Lowman); 14892 (Waverly); 14901 (Elmira)
- Area code: 607
- FIPS code: 36-015-15077
- GNIS feature ID: 0978818
- Website: townofchemung.gov

Chemung is a town in Chemung County, New York, United States. The population was 2,368 at the 2020 census. The town name is derived from the Chemung River, which means "big horn" in the Seneca language.

The town is in the southeast corner of the county and is southeast of Elmira. It is part of the Elmira Metropolitan Statistical Area.

== History ==
The region was destroyed by the Sullivan Expedition on August 13, 1779, which fought at the Battle of Newtown, just west of the current town of Chemung.

The first clear record of settlement dates to about 1786.

The town of Chemung was established in 1788 as the original town in the region. Chemung lost territory when Tioga County was formed in 1791. The town of Newtown (now the town of Elmira) was taken from Chemung in 1792. Chemung was incorporated in 1788 into Montgomery County, at the time of that town's formation. (Chemung County was not created until 1836.) Subsequently, the town of Chemung lost more territory to form all or parts of Erin (1822), Baldwin (1856), and Ashland (1867).

The Chemung District School No. 10, Dr. Hovey Everett House, and Riverside Cemetery are listed on the National Register of Historic Places.

== Geography ==
According to the United States Census Bureau, Chemung has a total area of 50.0 square miles (129.6 km^{2}), of which 49.5 square miles (128.2 km^{2}) is land and 0.58 square miles (1.5 km^{2}), or 1.12%, is water. The Chemung River, a tributary of the Susquehanna River, flows through the south part of the town.

The south border of the town is Pennsylvania (Bradford County), and the east border is Tioga County.

The Southern Tier Expressway (Interstate 86 and New York State Route 17) and New York State Route 427 are east-west highways in Chemung.

== Demographics ==
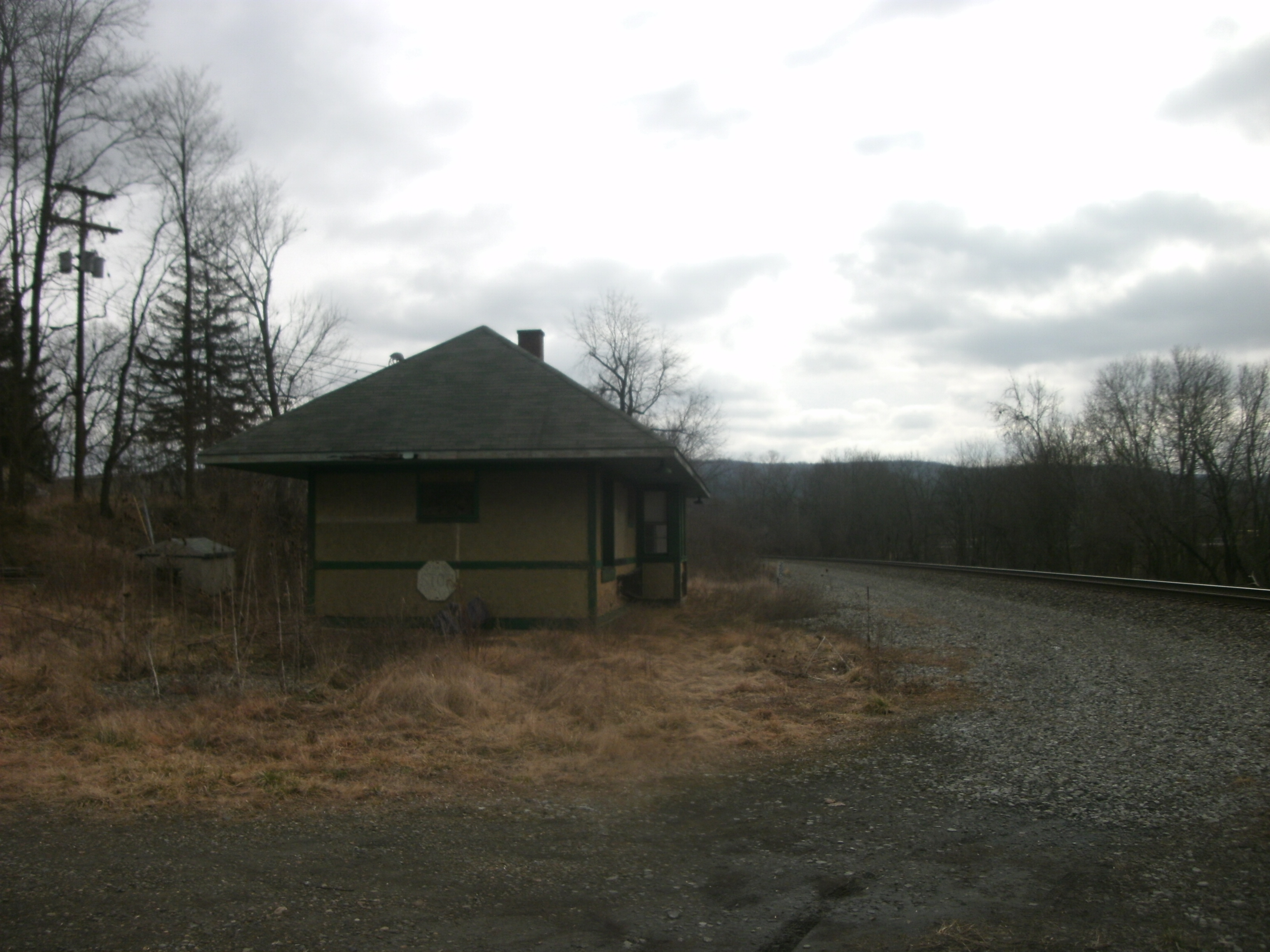
The former Erie Railroad station in Chemung as seen in February 2012

Historical population
Census	Pop.	Note	%±
1790	2,391		—
1820	1,327		—
1830	1,462		10.2%
1840	2,377		62.6%
1850	2,673		12.5%
1860	2,128		−20.4%
1870	1,907		−10.4%
1880	2,098		10.0%
1890	1,610		−23.3%
1900	1,500		−6.8%
1910	1,328		−11.5%
1920	1,147		−13.6%
1930	1,285		12.0%
1940	1,363		6.1%
1950	1,553		13.9%
1960	1,842		18.6%
1970	2,156		17.0%
1980	2,436		13.0%
1990	2,540		4.3%
2000	2,665		4.9%
2010	2,563		−3.8%
2020	2,368		−7.6%
2021 (est.)	2,332		−1.5%
U.S. Decennial Census

As of the census of 2000, there were 2,665 people, 969 households, and 749 families residing in the town. The population density was 53.9 inhabitants per square mile (20.8/km^{2}). There were 1,054 housing units at an average density of 21.3 per square mile (8.2/km^{2}). The racial makeup of the town was 97.64% White, 0.53% African American, 0.26% Native American, 0.19% Asian, 0.45% from other races, and 0.94% from two or more races. Hispanic or Latino of any race were 0.83% of the population.

There were 969 households, out of which 36.9% had children under the age of 18 living with them, 64.2% were married couples living together, 7.2% had a female householder with no husband present, and 22.7% were non-families. 17.2% of all households were made up of individuals, and 7.6% had someone living alone who was 65 years of age or older. The average household size was 2.71 and the average family size was 3.03.

In the town, the population was spread out, with 28.0% under the age of 18, 6.8% from 18 to 24, 29.3% from 25 to 44, 23.5% from 45 to 64, and 12.4% who were 65 years of age or older. The median age was 37 years. For every 100 females, there were 101.9 males. For every 100 females age 18 and over, there were 99.7 males.

The median income for a household in the town was $35,167, and the median income for a family was $37,885. Males had a median income of $29,844 versus $22,958 for females. The per capita income for the town was $15,201. About 8.5% of families and 11.7% of the population were below the poverty line, including 15.9% of those under age 18 and 1.1% of those age 65 or over.

== Communities and locations in the Town of Chemung ==
- Beantown – A hamlet in the northwestern part of the town on County Road 3.
- Chemung – The hamlet of Chemung is located near the southern town line. The community is adjacent to the Southern Tier Expressway and the Chemung River.
- Mallory Creek – A stream flowing past Owens Mills into Wynkoop Creek.
- Owens Mills – A hamlet near the center of the town on County Road 23.
- Wynkoop Creek – A stream on the western side of town flowing past Bean Town and entering the Chemung River near Chemung village.

== Notable people ==
- 1986 Daytona 500 champion Geoff Bodine, Brett Bodine, and NASCAR Craftsman Truck champion Todd Bodine, all NASCAR drivers
- Wells Spicer, judge who presided over preliminary hearing to see if Virgil, Wyatt, and Morgan Earp as well as Doc Holliday would stand trial for murder following the Gunfight at the O.K. Corral; also was defense attorney for John D. Lee in his trial for his involvement in the Mountain Meadows massacre
