= Alexander Eustace House =

Historic house in New York, United States

- U.S. National Register of Historic Places
- U.S. Historic district – Contributing property
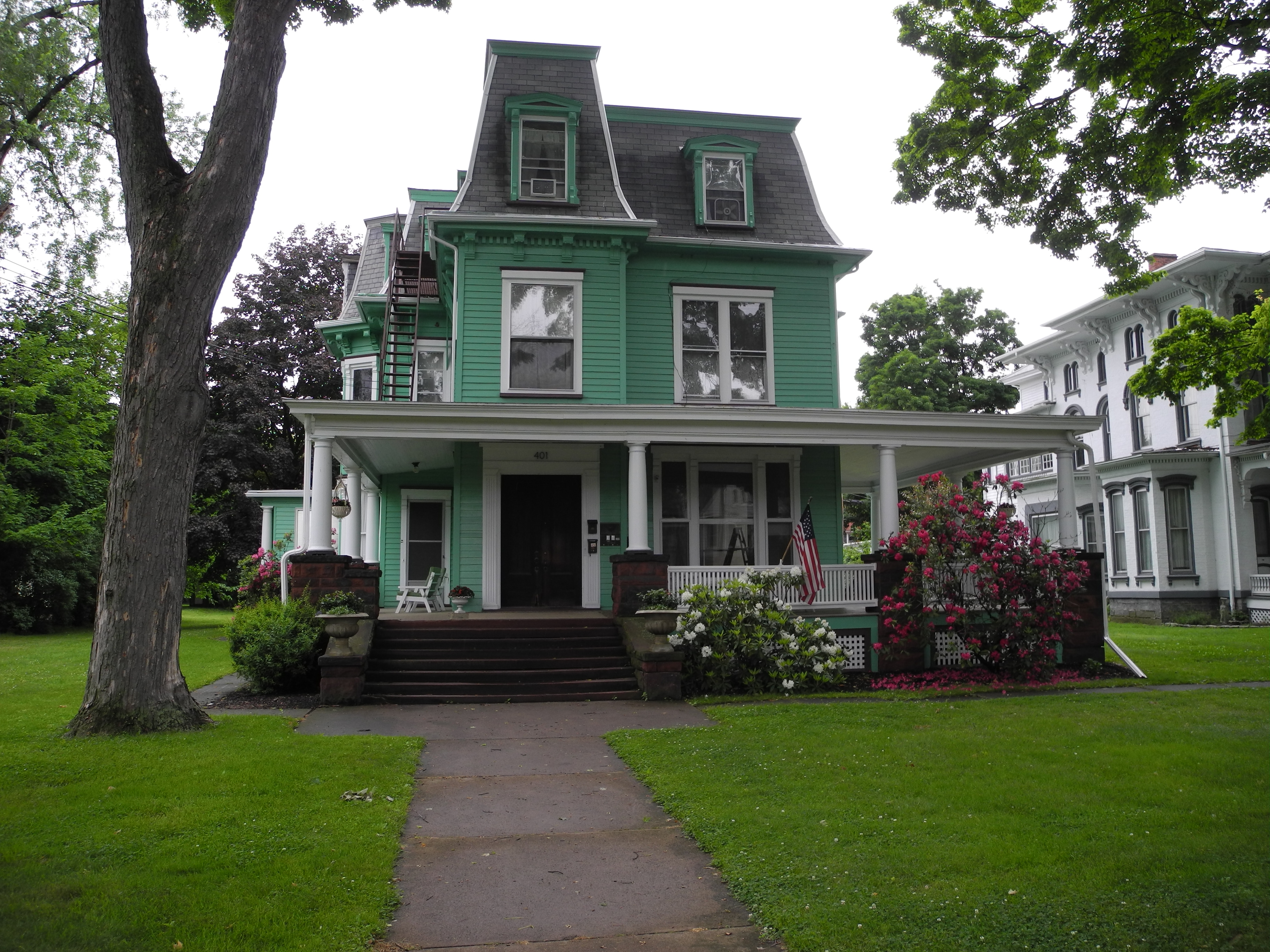

- Location within New York Location within the United States
- Location: 401 Maple Ave., Elmira, New York
- Coordinates: 42°5′5″N 76°47′46″W
- Area: Less than 1 acre (0.40 ha)
- Built: 1886
- Architectural style: Second Empire
- NRHP reference No.: 11000996
- Added to NRHP: January 4, 2012

The Alexander Eustace House is a historic house located at 401 Maple Avenue in Elmira, which is in Chemung County, New York.

== History ==
The Alexander Eustace house was built in 1886 for lawyer Alexander Eustace, who served several positions in Chemung County, such as the Chemung County clerk, served as a member of the state Civil Service Commission, and was also the head of the state tax department Eustace was known for his confrontation with New York Governor Roswell P. Flower about the manipulation of civil service laws which allegedly allowed Flower to appoint political cronies, which resulted in Eustace's resignation. Afterwards Eustace worked as a lawyer in Elmira and was a philanthropist who worked with St. Joseph's Hospital. Eustace died in 1913.

The Alexander Eustace House was recommended for National Register of Historic Places by the New York State Board for Historic Preservation in late 2011 and was added to the registry on January 4, 2012. It is located in the Maple Avenue Historic District.

== Architectural Style ==
According to the nomination form, the Eustace home is an example of a Highly-intact Second Empire-style home. The three-story, irregularly shaped frame dwelling features a mansard roof and wraparound porch. It has been divided into six apartments.
