= John Brand Sr. House =

Historic house in New York, United States

- U.S. National Register of Historic Places
- U.S. Historic district – Contributing property
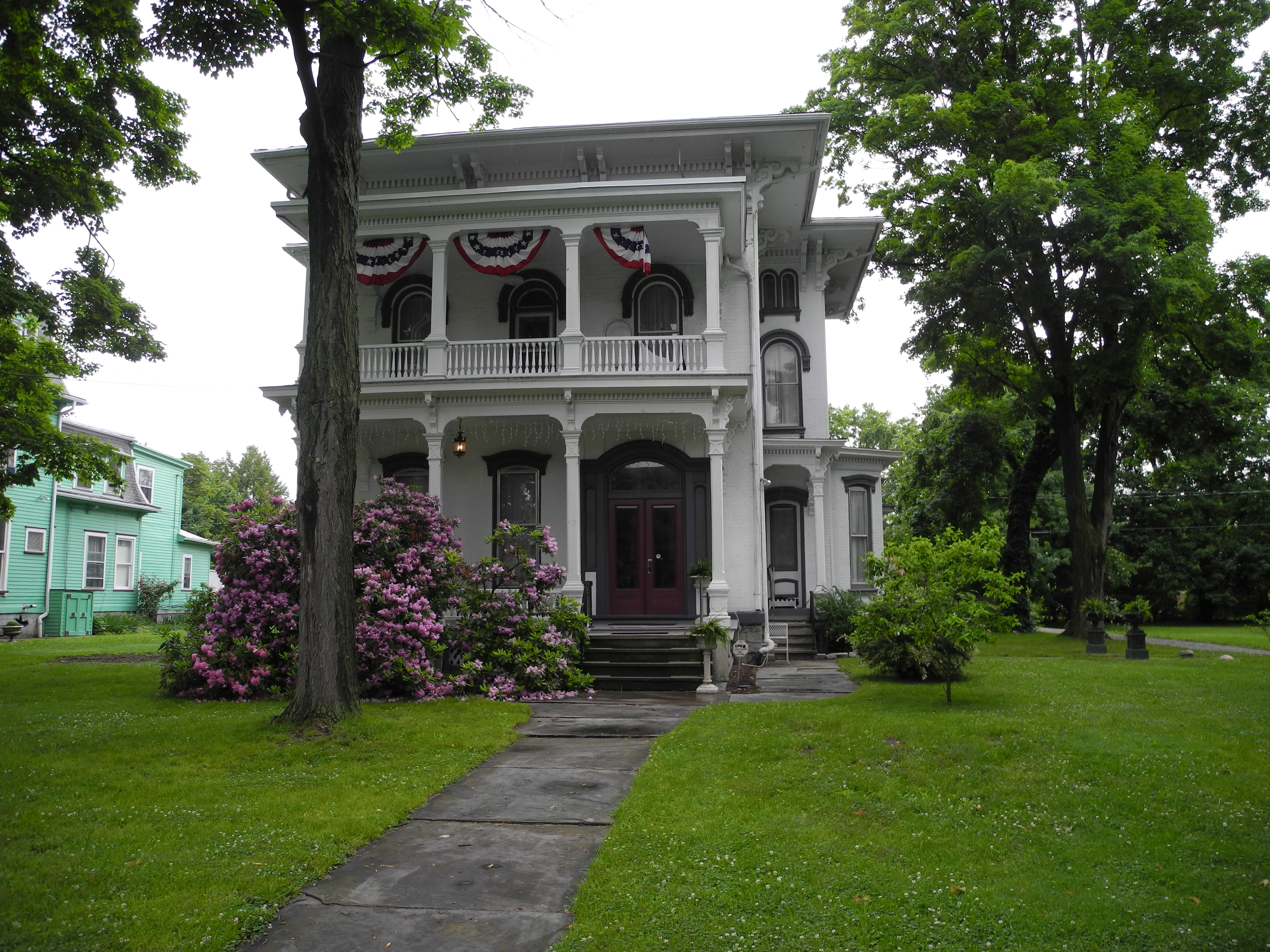

- Location within New York Location within the United States
- Location: 405 Maple Ave., Elmira, New York
- Coordinates: 42°5′4″N 76°47′45″W
- Area: 0.92 acres (0.37 ha)
- Built: 1870
- Architectural style: Italianate
- NRHP reference No.: 10000913
- Added to NRHP: November 10, 2010

John Brand Sr. House is a historic home located at Elmira in Chemung County, New York. It was built about 1870 and is a large 2 1/2-story, Italianate-style dwelling with a 2-story wing. Also on the property is a concrete fountain basin with a reproduction Victorian fountainhead.

It was listed on the National Register of Historic Places in 2010. It is located in the Maple Avenue Historic District.
