= Riverside Cemetery (Lowman, New York) =

Historic cemetery in New York, United States

- U.S. National Register of Historic Places
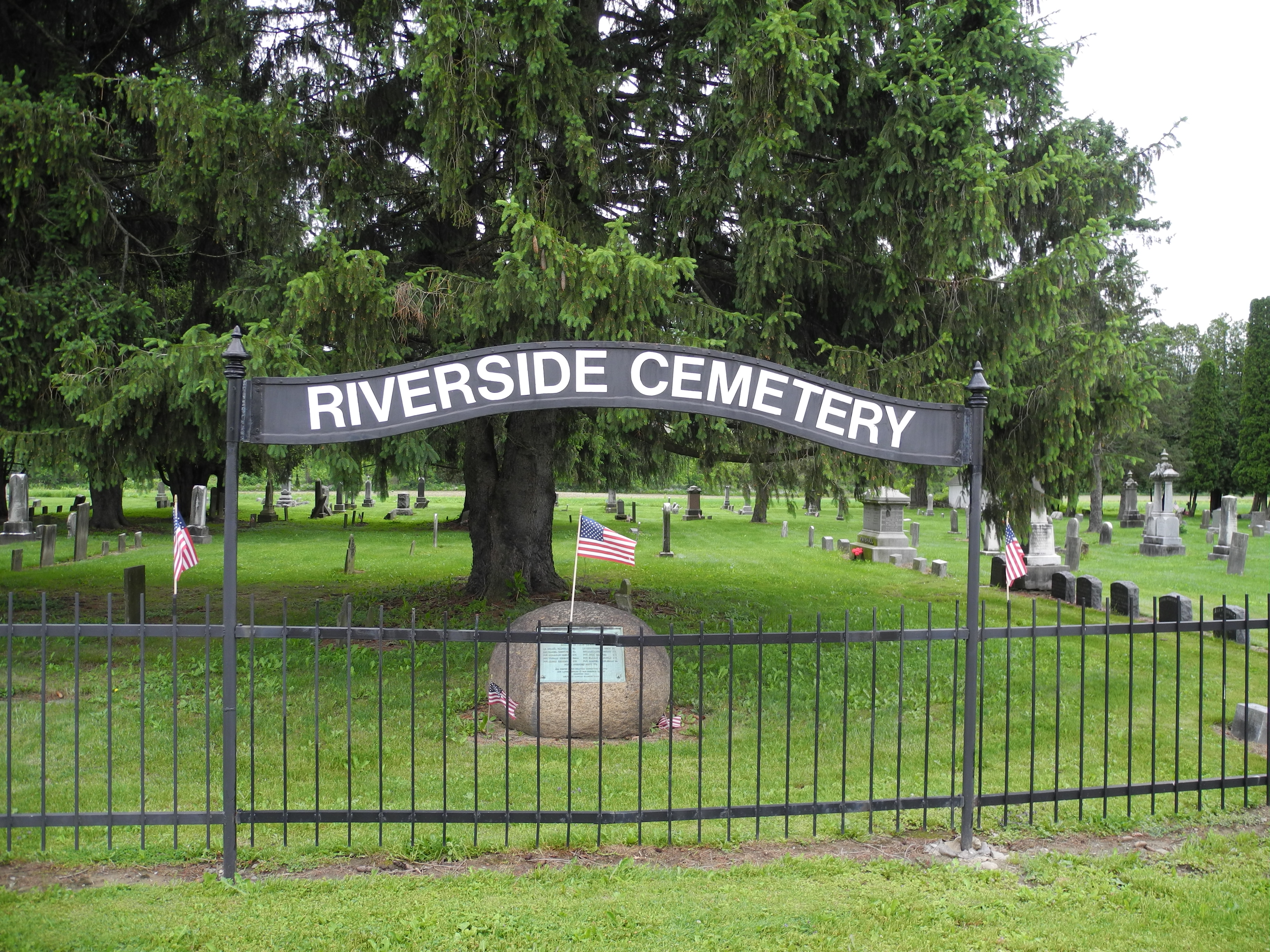
- Riverside Cemetery, June 2013

- Location within New York Location within the United States
- Location: County Route 60, near Lowman, Chemung, New York
- Coordinates: 42°01′45″N 76°40′37″W
- Area: 3.68 acres (1.49 ha)
- Built: c. 1795
- NRHP reference No.: 12000953
- Added to NRHP: November 21, 2012

Riverside Cemetery is a historic cemetery located near Lowman, Chemung, Chemung County, New York. It was established in the 1790s, and contains graves dating from then to the present. It has a cast iron gate archway inscribed "Riverside Cemetery" and dated to about 1900. The cemetery includes the graves of many early settlers and Revolutionary War soldiers. Notable burials include Lieutenant Governor Seymour Lowman (1868–1940).

It was added to the National Register of Historic Places in 2012.
