= Maple Avenue Historic District (Elmira, New York) =

Historic district in New York, United States

- U.S. National Register of Historic Places
- U.S. Historic district
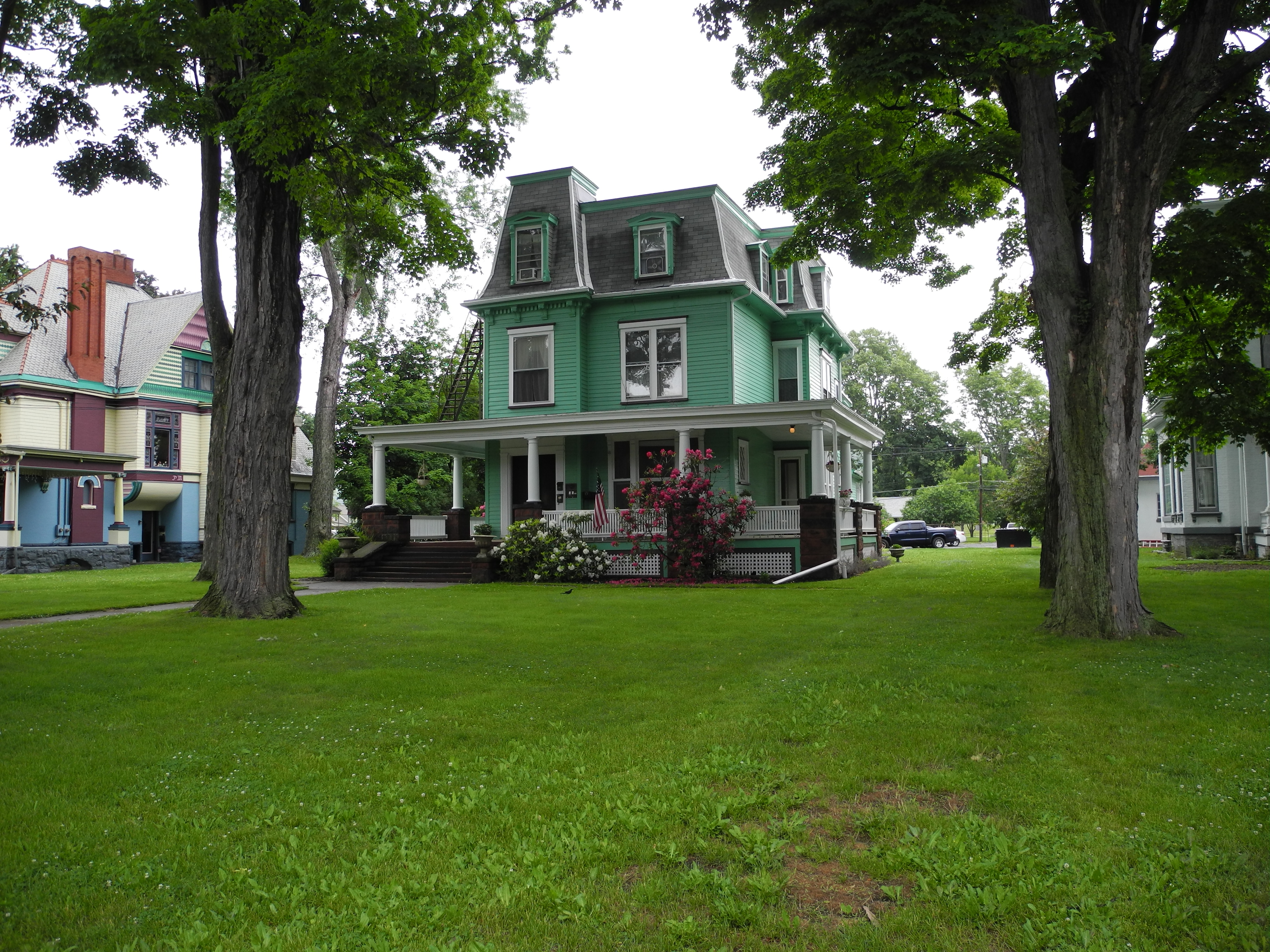
- House in the Maple Avenue Historic District, June 2013

- Location within New York Location within the United States
- Location: 310 to 782 Maple (west side), 351 to 761 Maple (east side), Elmira, New York
- Coordinates: 42°04′53″N 76°47′40″W
- Area: 31.29 acres (12.66 ha)
- Built: c. 1869-1940
- Architect: Pierce & Bickford et al.
- Architectural style: Italianate, Second Empire, Queen Anne, Colonial Revival, Craftsman, etc.
- NRHP reference No.: 13000599
- Added to NRHP: August 13, 2013

Maple Avenue Historic District is a national historic district located at Elmira, Chemung County, New York. It encompasses 121 contributing buildings and four contributing objects in a predominantly residential section of Elmira. It developed between about 1869 and 1940, and includes notable examples of Italianate, Second Empire, Queen Anne, Colonial Revival, and American Craftsman style architecture. Located in the district are the separately listed John Brand Jr. House, John Brand Sr. House, and Alexander Eustace House. Other notable buildings are the J.H. Harris House (1892), Samuel W. Clark House (c. 1869), James H. Clark House (c. 1869), and Horace W. Personius House (1913).

It was added to the National Register of Historic Places in 2013.
