= Chemung District School No. 10 =

- U.S. National Register of Historic Places
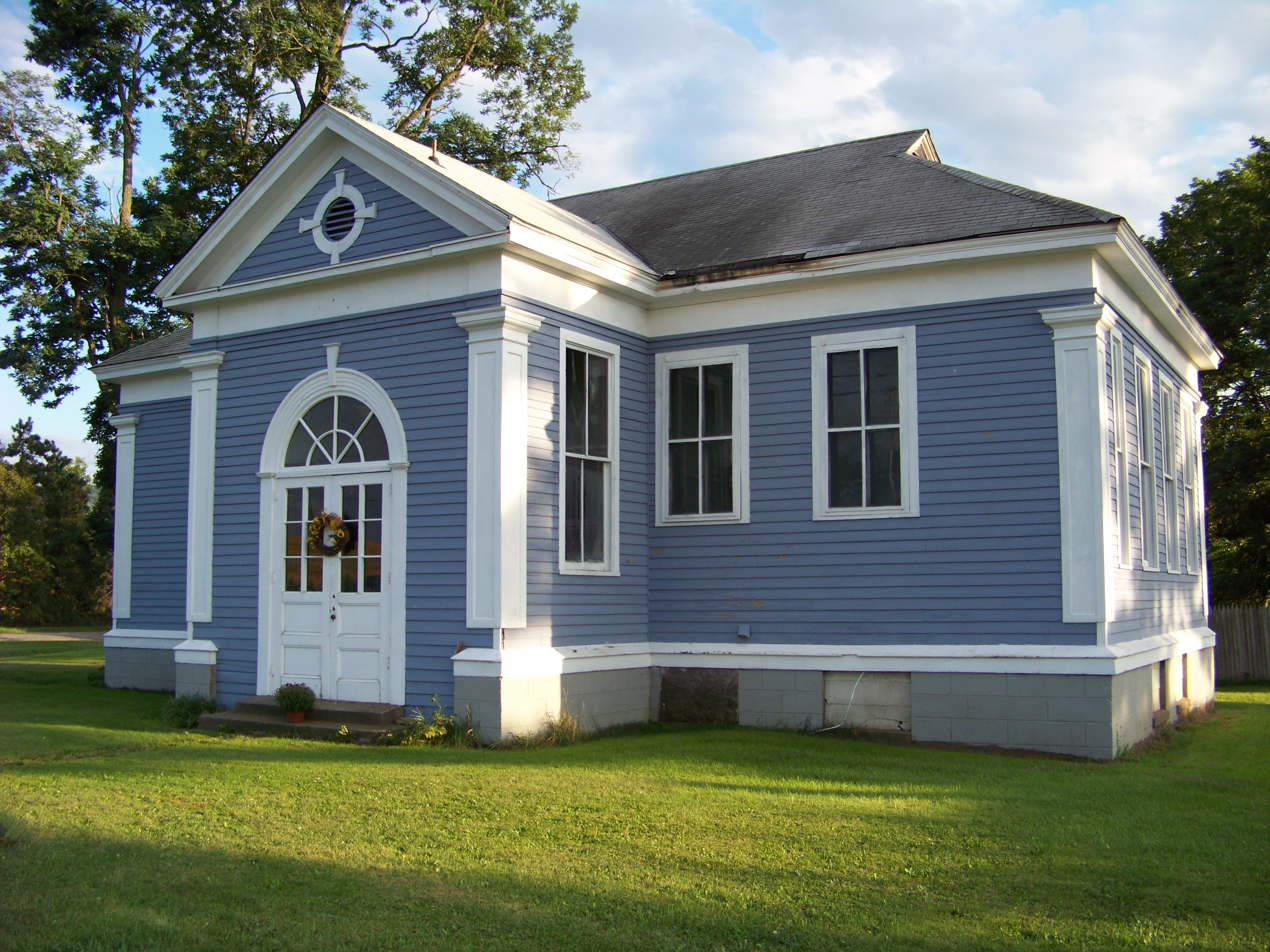

- Location within New York Location within the United States
- Location: Old NY 17 at Lowman Rd., Lowman, New York
- Coordinates: 42°1′44″N 76°42′56″W
- Built: 1898
- Architect: Welliver Construction Co.
- Architectural style: Colonial Revival
- NRHP reference No.: 08000449
- Added to NRHP: May 21, 2008

The Chemung District School No. 10 is a one-room schoolhouse located in Lowman, New York. It was listed on the National Register of Historic Places on May 21, 2008.

== Gallery ==
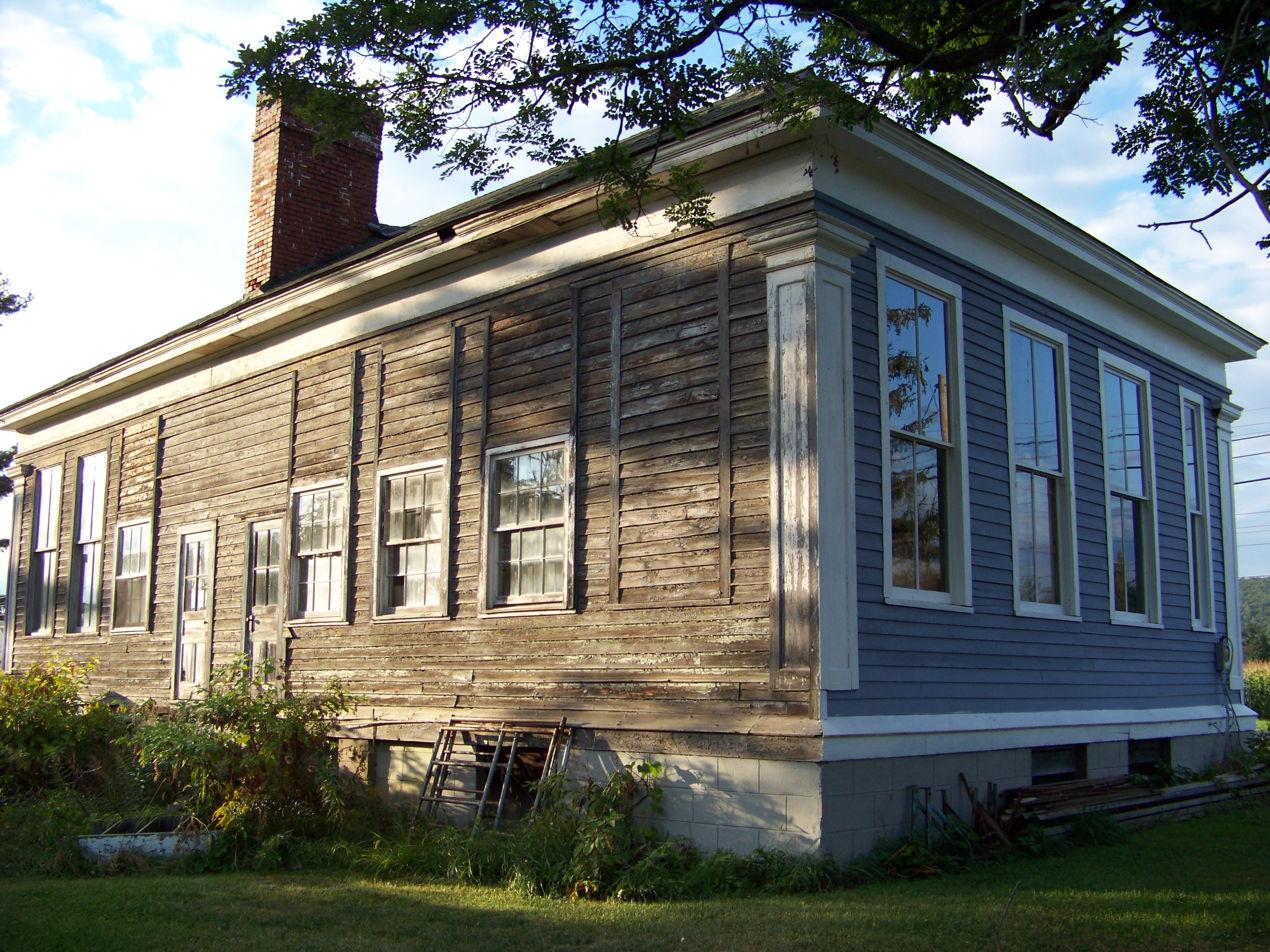
Chemung District School No. 10, rear elevation
