= John Brand Jr. House =

Historic house in New York, United States

- U.S. National Register of Historic Places
- U.S. Historic district – Contributing property
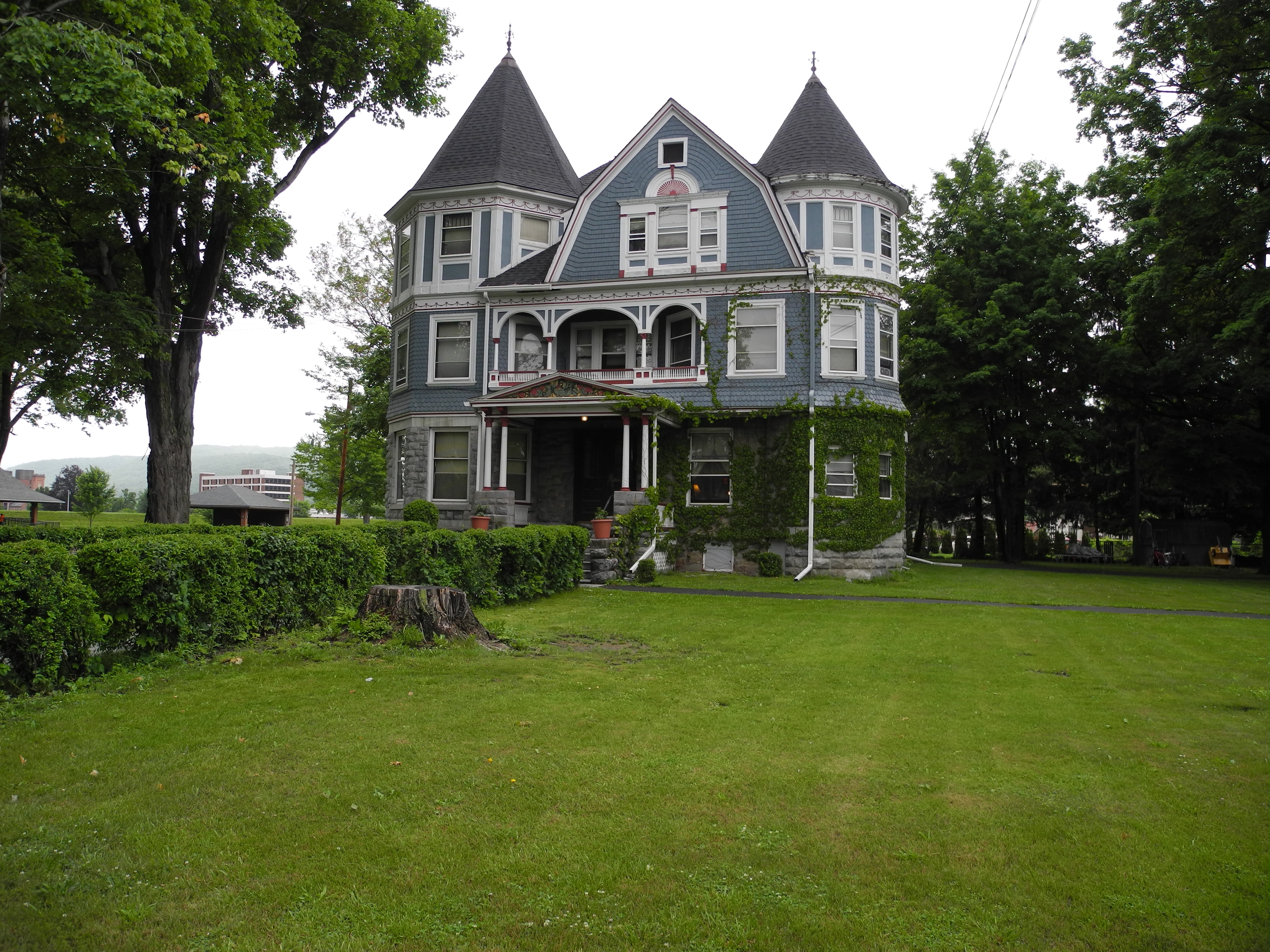

- Location within New York Location within the United States
- Location: 351 Maple Ave., Elmira, New York
- Coordinates: 42°5′5.94″N 76°47′49.39″W
- Area: 0.82 acres (0.33 ha)
- Built: 1890
- Architect: Otis Dockstader; Joseph H. Considine
- Architectural style: Queen Anne
- NRHP reference No.: 10000024
- Added to NRHP: February 22, 2010

The John Brand Jr. House is a historic house located at 351 Maple Avenue in Elmira, Chemung County, New York.

== Description and history ==
It was built in 1890, and is a large 2 1/2-story, Queen Anne–style dwelling. It features a large scale Palladian window on the west gable end. The house was designed by Elmira architect Otis Dockstader and his associate Joseph H. Considine.

It was listed on the National Register of Historic Places on February 22, 2010. It is located in the Maple Avenue Historic District.
