= 30th Separate Company Armory =

Coordinates: 42.091627°N 76.80358°W

Elmira Armory

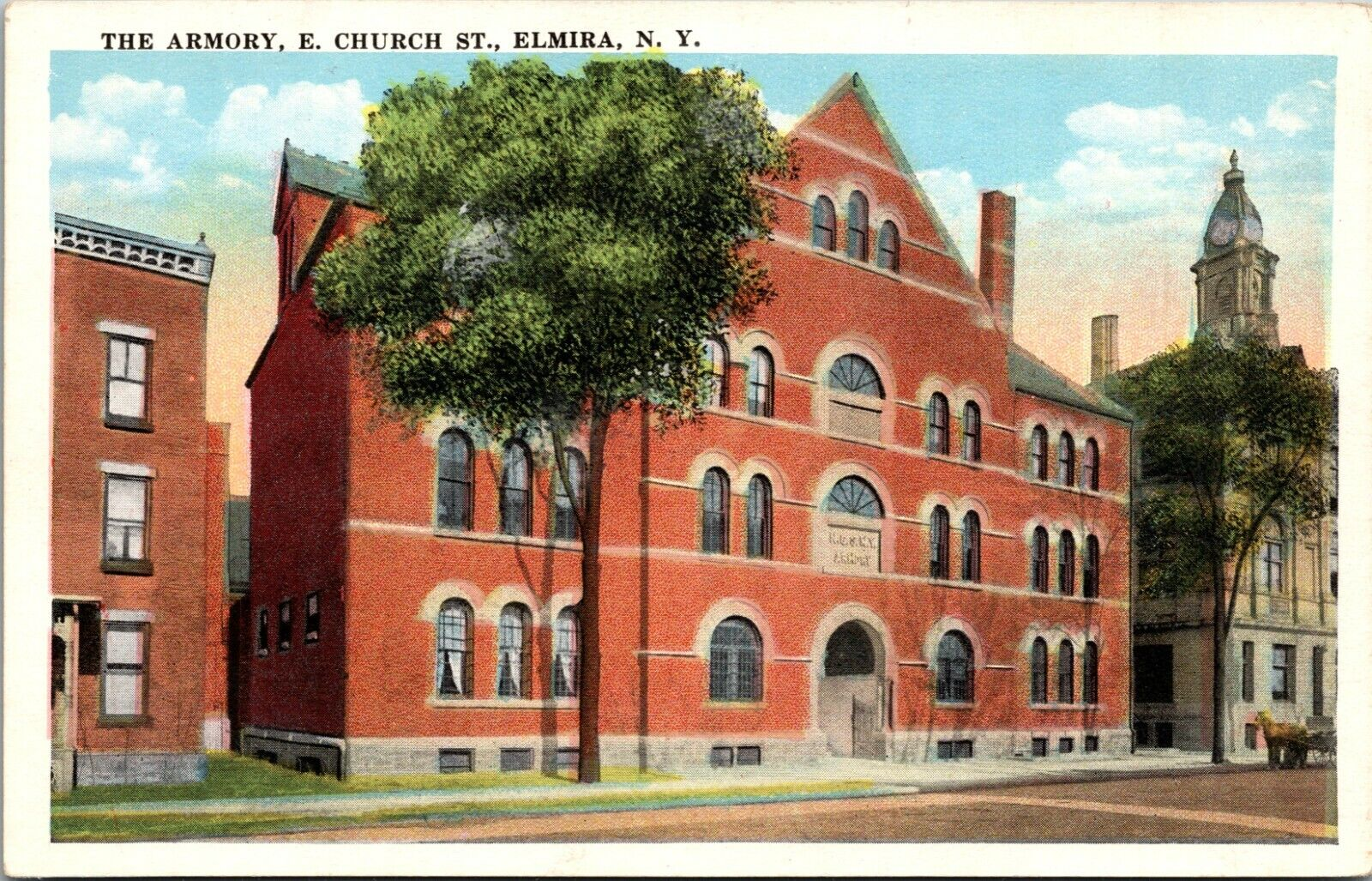
ca 1910

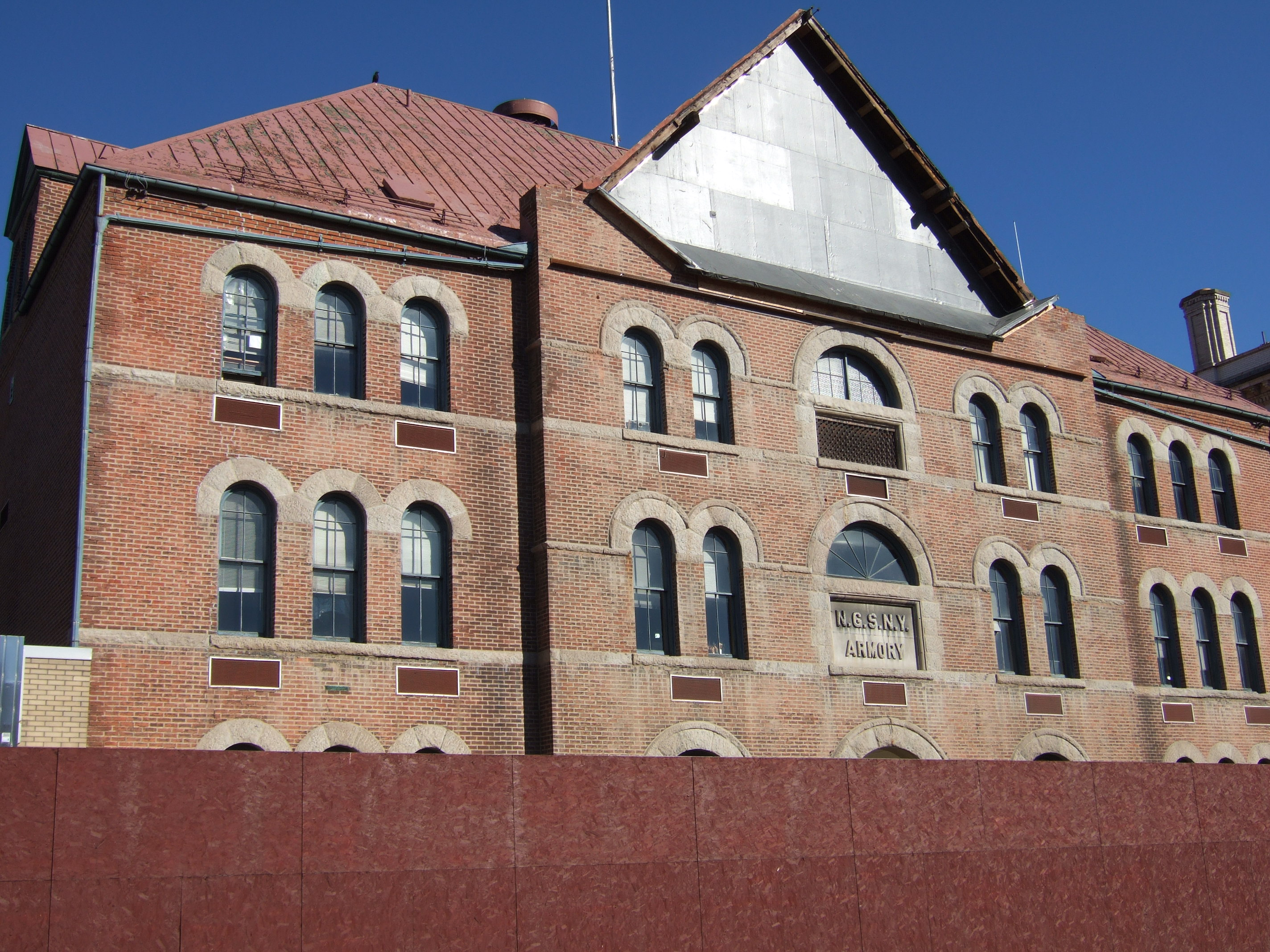
2007

The 30th Separate Company Armory, also known as the Elmira Armory, formerly located at 307 East Church Street in Elmira, New York, was built from 1886 to 1888. It was a contributing property of the Elmira Civic Historic District. The structure was designed by J. H. Pierce of the firm of Pierce & Bickford. Following decommissioning by the New York National Guard in the 1970s it was acquired by Chemung County and used as for offices and storage.

== Collapse of facade and demolition ==
The building was used as an annex to Elmira City Hall until March 10, 2006, when the facade of the Armory building collapsed, during a major windstorm. In December 2010, a project to demolish the building was completed.
