= Elmira Civic Historic District =

Historic district in New York, United States

- U.S. National Register of Historic Places
- U.S. Historic district
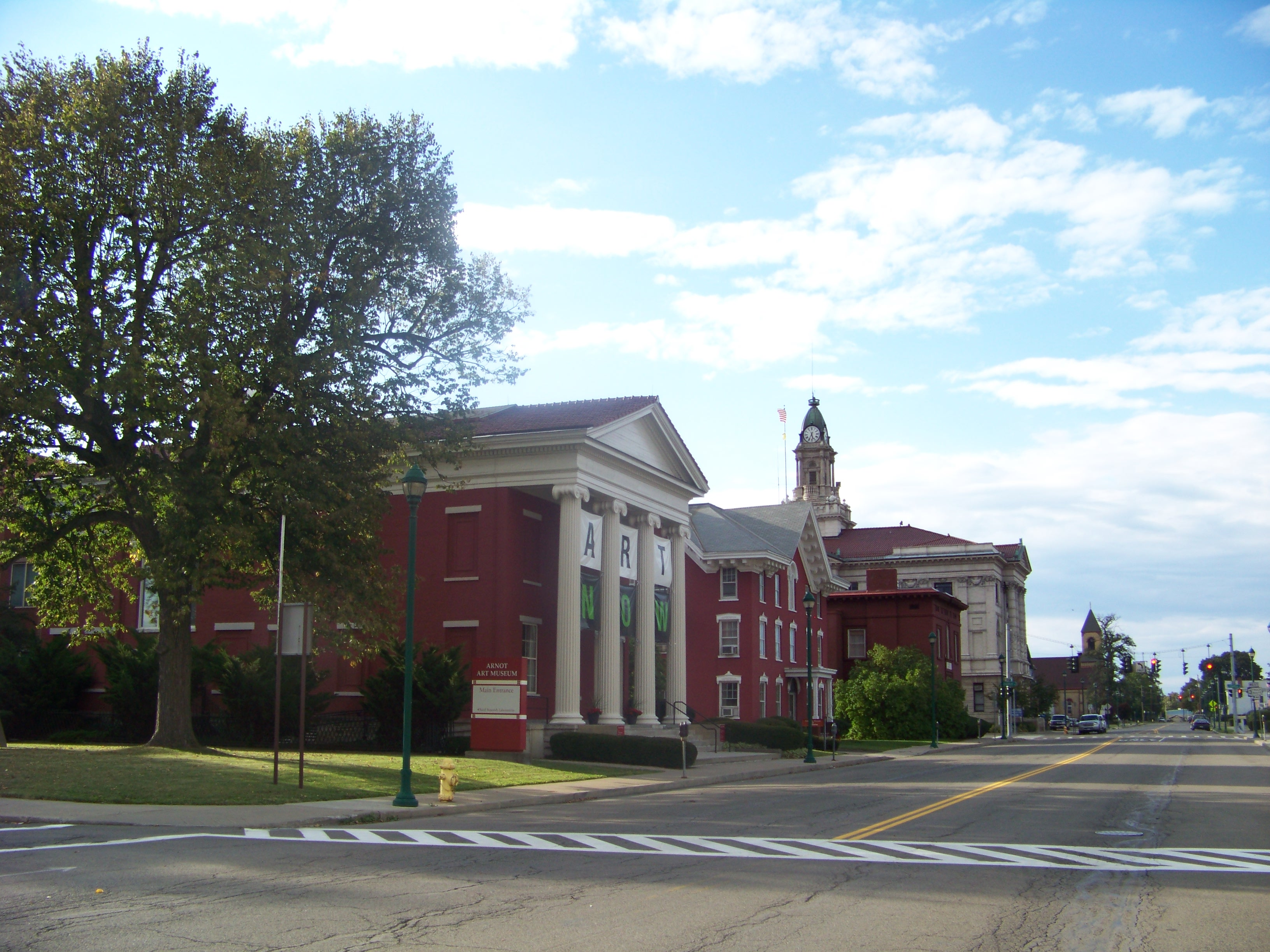
- Looking north on Lake Street, Arnot Art Museum in foreground

- Location within New York Location within the United States
- Interactive map showing the location for Elmira Civic Historic District
- Location: Elmira, New York
- Coordinates: 42°5′26″N 76°48′9″W
- Built: 1835
- Architect: Pierce & Bickford et al.
- Architectural style: Mid 19th Century Revival, Late 19th And 20th Century Revivals, Late Victorian
- NRHP reference No.: 80002596 (original); 100004956 (increase)

Significant dates
- Added to NRHP: July 30, 1980
- Boundary increase: January 20, 2020

The Elmira Civic Historic District is the area of downtown Elmira, New York where the governmental center developed in the town's early history. It includes the Chemung County Courthouse Complex, John Hazlett Office Building and the Arnot Art Museum/Icehouse, all on Lake Street. Among the contributing buildings on Church Street are the Richardson Romanesque style Armory Building, the Beaux Arts-style City Hall, designed by Pierce & Bickford, and the U. S. Post Office. Other buildings are on nearby Baldwin Street, Market Street and Carroll Street. The district was added to the National Register of Historic Places in 1980; four decades later its boundaries were revised.
