= Lowman, New York =

- Hamlet
- Location within New York Location within the United States
- Coordinates: 42°01′47″N 076°43′14″W
- Country: United States
- State: New York
- County: Chemung
- Towns: Ashland and Chemung
- ZIP Code: 14861
- GNIS feature ID: 956121

Lowman is a hamlet of the towns of Ashland and Chemung in Chemung County, New York, United States. The zipcode is: 14861.

The Riverside Cemetery was listed on the National Register of Historic Places in 2012.
