= Eugene Zimmerman =

American cartoonist

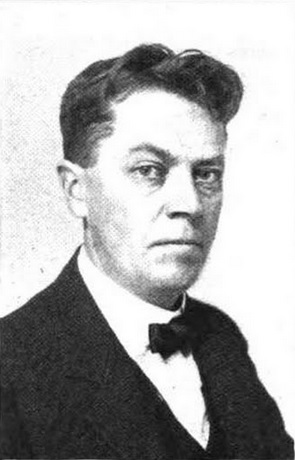
- Born: May 26, 1862 Basel, Switzerland
- Died: March 26, 1935 (aged 72)
- Area: Cartoonist

Eugene "Zim" Zimmerman (May 26, 1862 – March 26, 1935) was a Swiss-American cartoonist. Much of his work appeared in the magazines Puck and, later, Judge.

== Early life ==
Cartoons and Caricatures, or, Making the World Laugh, 1910 book

He was born in Basel, Switzerland. His mother died and he was sent to live with relatives in Alsace. In 1867 his father, who was a baker, and an older brother emigrated to the United States. In 1868 Zimmerman was placed on a ship and followed them.

Poverty and restricted circumstances characterized his early years as he moved from relatives to working in different jobs. In 1877 he became an apprentice sign painter and continued in this line of work for several years, nurturing a desire to become a professional cartoonist. By copying the work of cartoonists, he acquired the skills necessary to gather a portfolio, which gained him an interview in May 1883 with Joseph Keppler, the director of Puck magazine. He was hired and began work at one of the most remarkable satirical magazines of the late 19th century. While he worked at Puck, he supplemented his income with lucrative freelance work. In 1885 he dropped the last portion of his signature and became known as Zim.

== Career ==
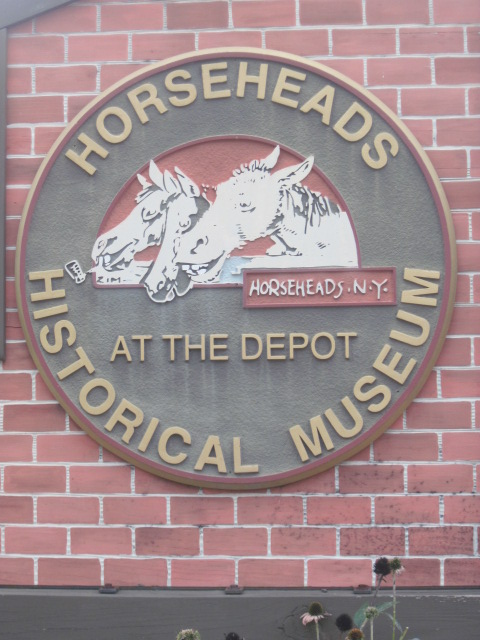
This sign, found at the Chemung Railway Depot-Horseheads features a visual caricature of Horseheads's name

After two and a half years at Puck (from May 1883 to December 1885), Zim moved to Judge magazine, directed by Bernhard Gillam. Here he was better paid and enjoyed greater freedom in his selection of subjects. The following year he married Mabel Alice Beard of Horseheads, New York. In 1888, in search of a more gentle pace of life, he and Mabel moved to Horseheads. Zim then traveled to New York on alternate weeks to fulfill his commitments at the magazine. Like many contemporary cartoonists, Zim generated cartoons of all varieties, including some which could be considered offensive for their ethnic stereotypes. He remained at Judge until his retirement in 1912.

Becoming one of America's best-known cartoonists, he published more than 40,000 sketches in his lifetime. The illustrious painter William Merritt Chase, on a visit to the offices of Judge in 1897, voiced his praise for Zim's artistry and related that the artist Edwin Austin Abbey pasted his work in a book.

After his retirement from Judge, Zim was founder and first president of the American Association of Cartoonists and Caricaturists.

In Horseheads, Zim participated actively in the life of the community. He eventually designed the small town's Teal Park Bandstand, which happened to be located next to his house.

He died on March 26, 1935.

== Legacy ==
Horseheads preserves the artist's residence, known as Zim House, that possesses papers, sketches, and correspondence.

== Works ==
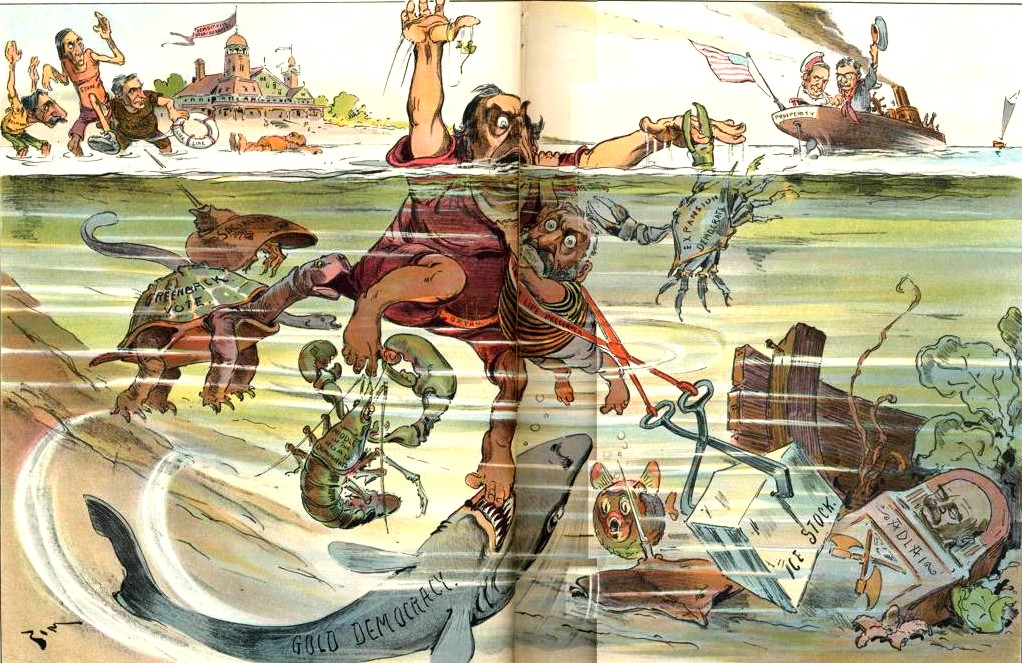
"Down Goes McGinty", a cartoon featuring William Jennings Bryan, Democratic presidential nominee of 1900

- This and That About Caricature. New York: Syndicate Press, 1905.
- Cartoons and Caricatures. Scranton, PA: Correspondence Institute of America, 1910.
- ZIM's Foolish History of Elmira and its Tributaries. Horseheads, NY: Chemung Valley Reporter, 1911.
- ZIM's Foolish History of Horseheads. Horseheads, NY: Eugene Zimmerman, 1911.
- In Dairyland. Horseheads, NY: Eugene Zimmerman, 1914.
- Language and Etticket of Poker. Horseheads, NY: Eugene Zimmerman, 1916.
- A Jug Full of Wisdom; Homespun Phoolosophy. Horseheads, NY: Eugene Zimmerman, 1916.
- Fire; Heroic Deeds for the Dingville Fire Department. Buffalo, NY: Holling Press, 1922.
- Foolish History of Horseheads. Horseheads, NY: Chemung Valley Reporter, 1927.
- Foolish History of Horseheads. Horseheads, NY: Eugene Zimmerman, 1929.
