= Teal Park =

- U.S. National Register of Historic Places
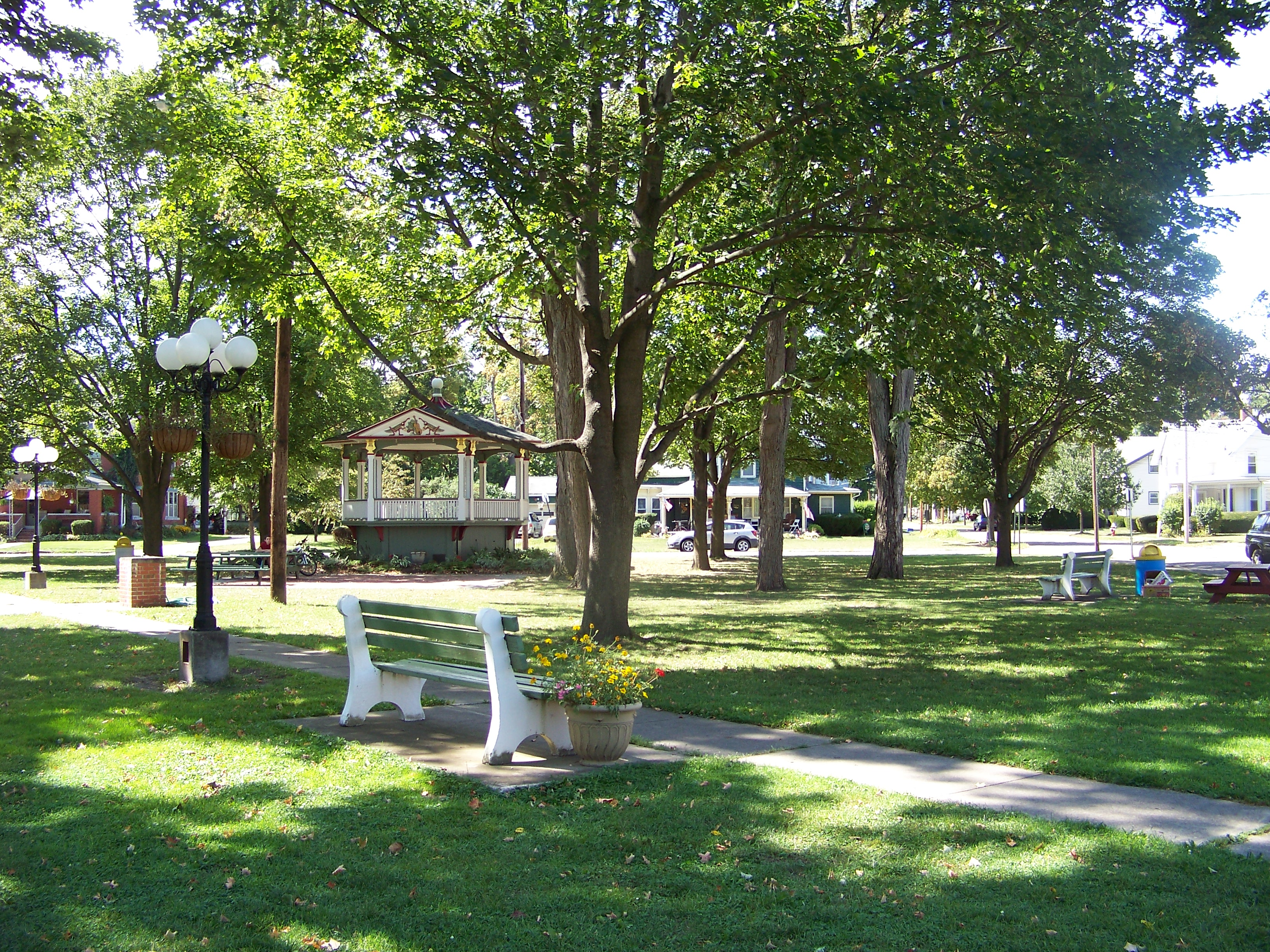

- Location within New York Location within the United States
- Location: Horseheads, New York
- Coordinates: 42°9′51″N 76°49′11″W
- Built: 1910
- Architect: Eugene Zimmerman, Alvah Beard
- MPS: Zim TR
- NRHP reference No.: 83003907
- Added to NRHP: October 7, 1983

Teal Park is a public greenspace in Horseheads, New York. The park was added to the National Register of Historic Places in 1983 and is contained within the Horseheads 1855 Extension Historic District.

== History ==
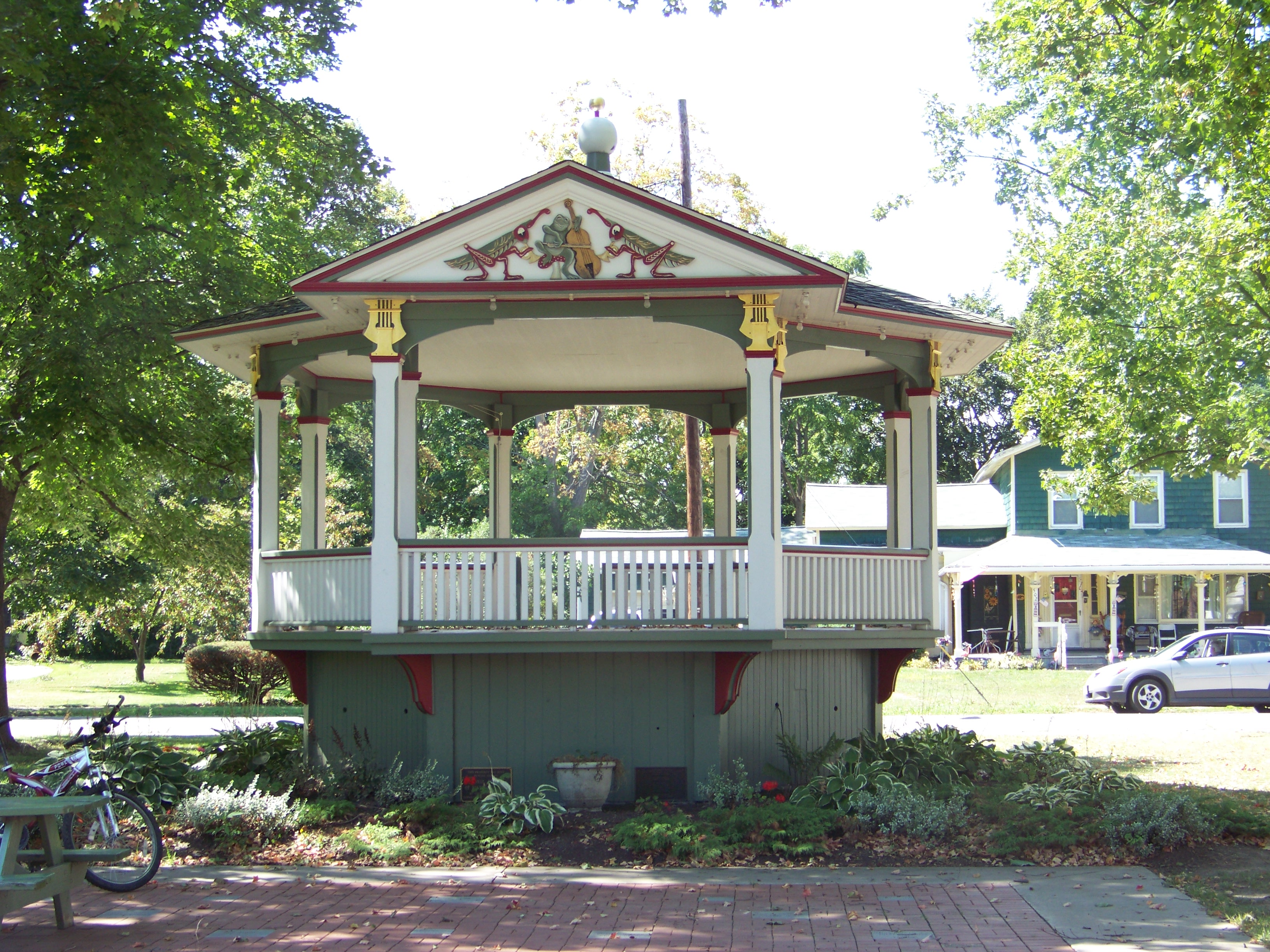
Zim Bandstand

The land for the park was donated to the town in 1807. In 1910, political cartoonist Eugene Zimmerman, a resident of the town, designed the bandstand still standing today, known as the Zim Bandstand. The park is adjacent to the Zimmerman House, which was Eugene's home.

== Usage ==
During the summer, Teal Park is home to the Horseheads farmer's market which meets on every Saturday from 10 a.m. to 2 p.m. A concert series is held in the park every Thursday starting on the last Thursday of June, and ending in August.
