= Hanover Square Historic District =

Hanover Square Historic District may refer to:

- Hanover Square Historic District (Horseheads, New York)
- Hanover Square Historic District, centered on Hanover Square, Syracuse, New York
