= Zimmerman House (Horseheads, New York) =

Historic house in New York, United States

- U.S. National Register of Historic Places
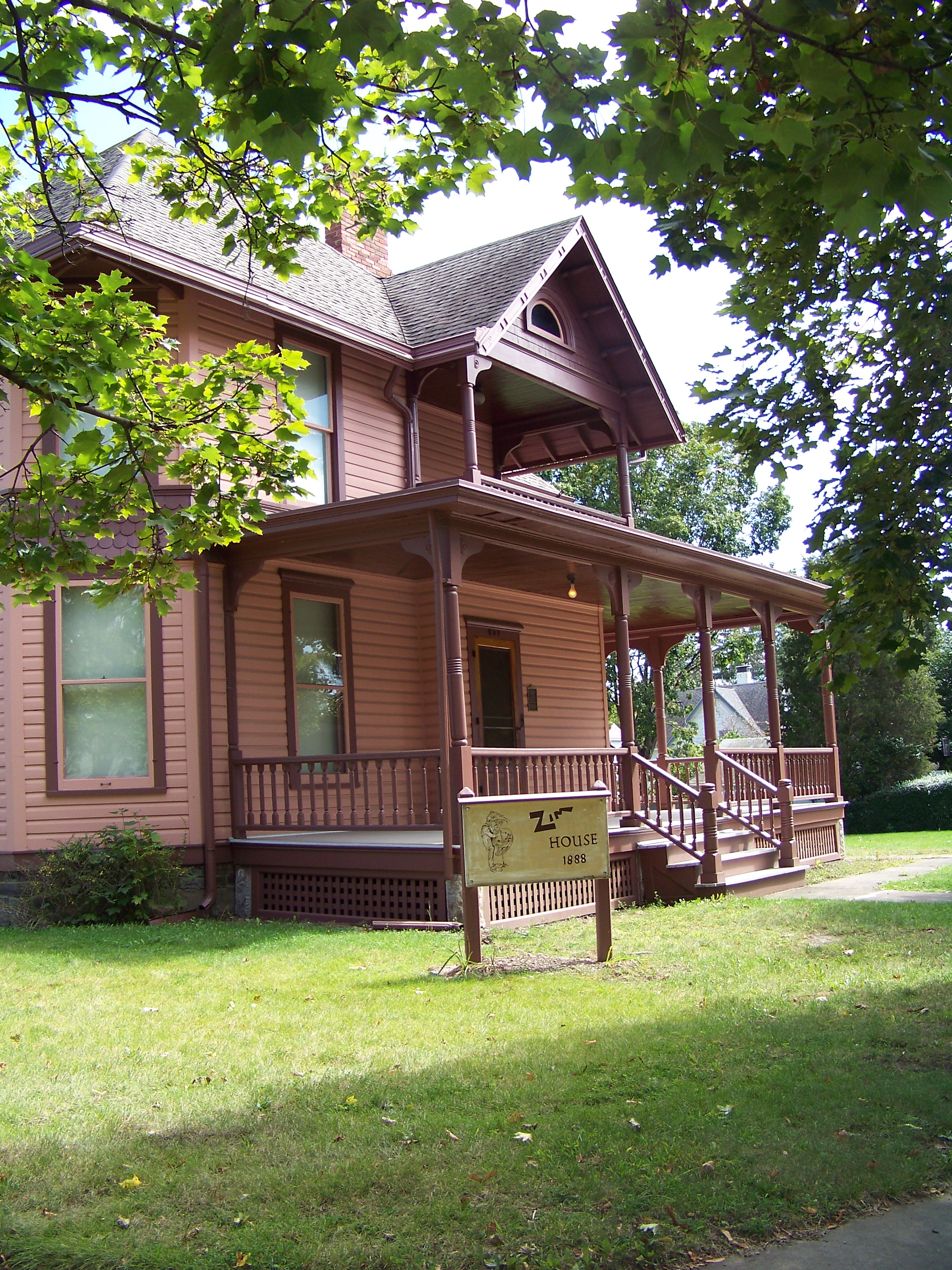

- Location within New York Location within the United States
- Location: Horseheads, New York
- Coordinates: 42°9′44″N 76°49′12″W
- Architect: Zimmerman, Eugene; Beard, Alvah
- Architectural style: Queen Anne
- MPS: Zim TR
- NRHP reference No.: 83003912
- Added to NRHP: October 07, 1983

Zimmerman House, also known as Zim House, is a historical structure located in Horseheads, New York. It was the home of cartoonist Eugene Zimmerman, also known as "Zim". The architectural and historic significance of the house led to its listing in the National Register of Historic Places in 1983.

Zimmerman designed the house in 1890 in a Queen Anne style. It was built by his father-in-law, Alvah Beard. Zimmerman also designed the Zim Bandstand in nearby Teal Park. Both are in Horseheads's1855 Extension Historic District.

The house is open for tour by appointment with the Horseheads Historical Society and features some of Zimmerman's works on display.

== Gallery ==
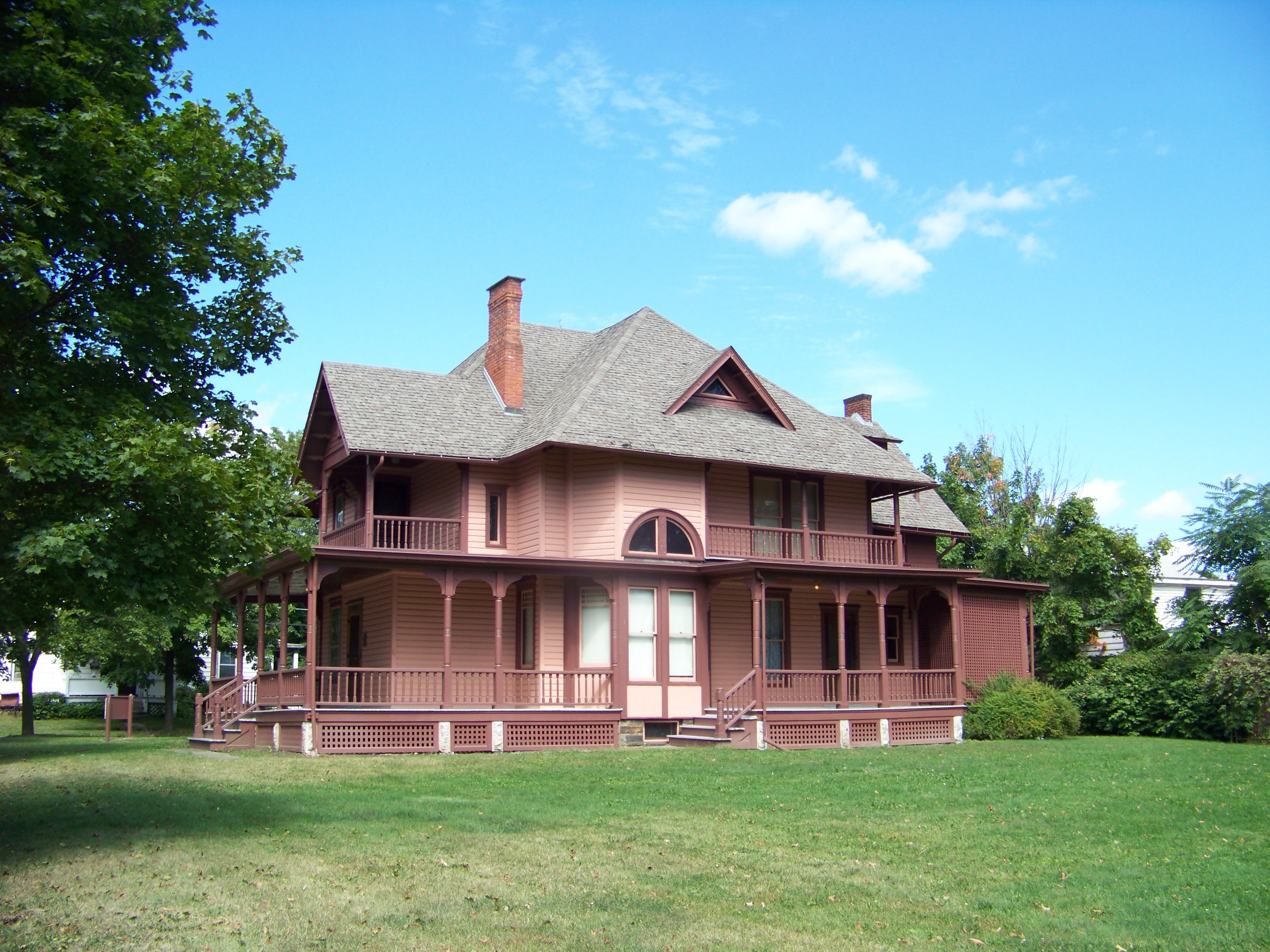
Zimmerman House
