= Horseheads (village), New York =

Horseheads, New York
- Village
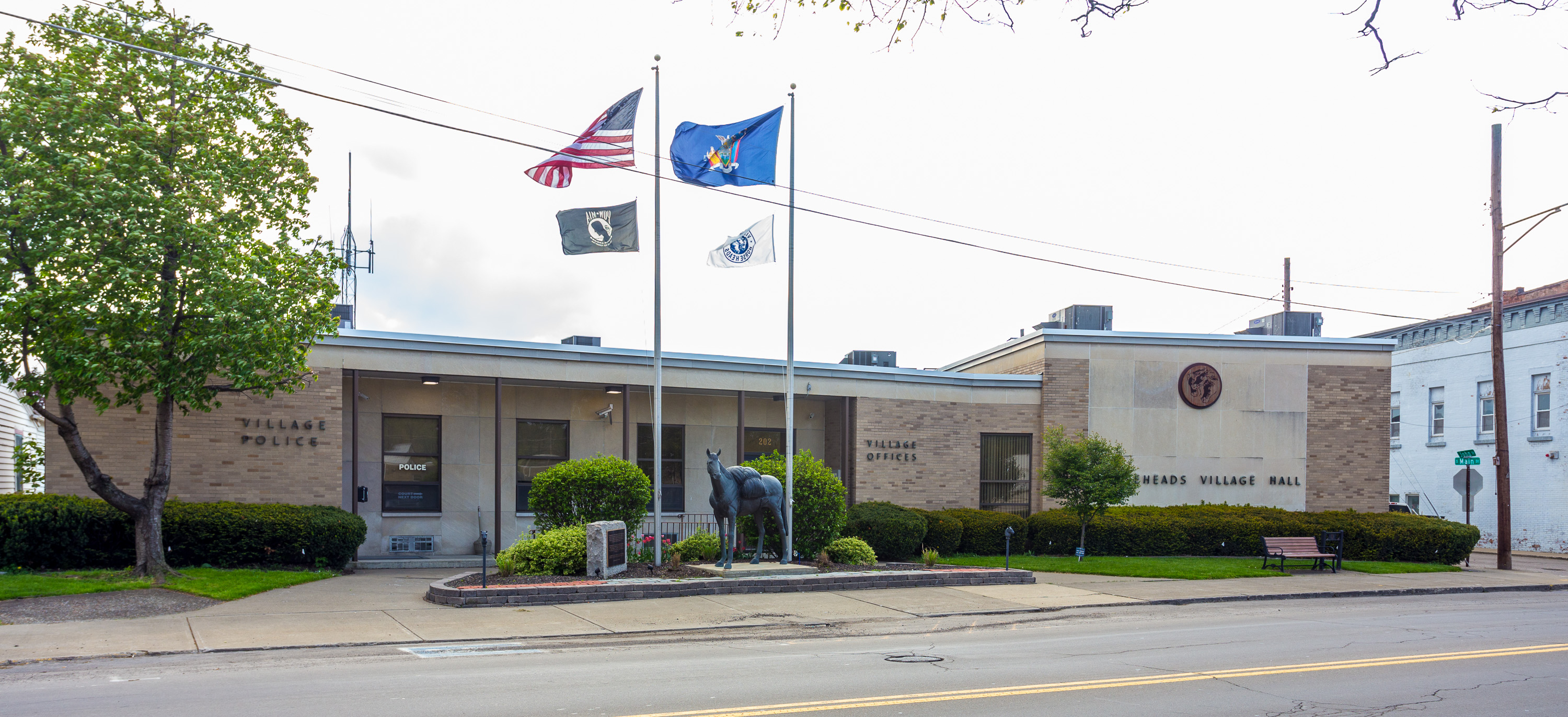
- Horseheads Village Hall and Police Station

- Location within New York Location within the United States
- Coordinates: 42°9′59″N 76°49′39″W
- Country: United States
- State: New York
- County: Chemung
- Town: Horseheads

Area
  - Total: 3.91 sq mi (10.12 km^{2})
  - Land: 3.89 sq mi (10.08 km^{2})
  - Water: 0.015 sq mi (0.04 km^{2})
- Elevation: 896 ft (273 m)

Population (2020)
  - Total: 6,606
  - Density: 1,696.7/sq mi (655.09/km^{2})
- Time zone: UTC-5 (Eastern (EST))
  - Summer (DST): UTC-4 (EDT)
- ZIP Code: 14845
- Area code: 607
- FIPS code: 36-35694
- GNIS feature ID: 0953232
- Website: www.villageofhorseheads.gov

Horseheads is a village in Chemung County, New York, United States. The population was 6,606 at the 2020 census. The name is derived from the number of bleached skulls of pack horses left behind by the Sullivan Expedition.

The village of Horseheads is located within the town of Horseheads. It is north of the city of Elmira and is part of the Elmira Metropolitan Statistical Area.

== History ==
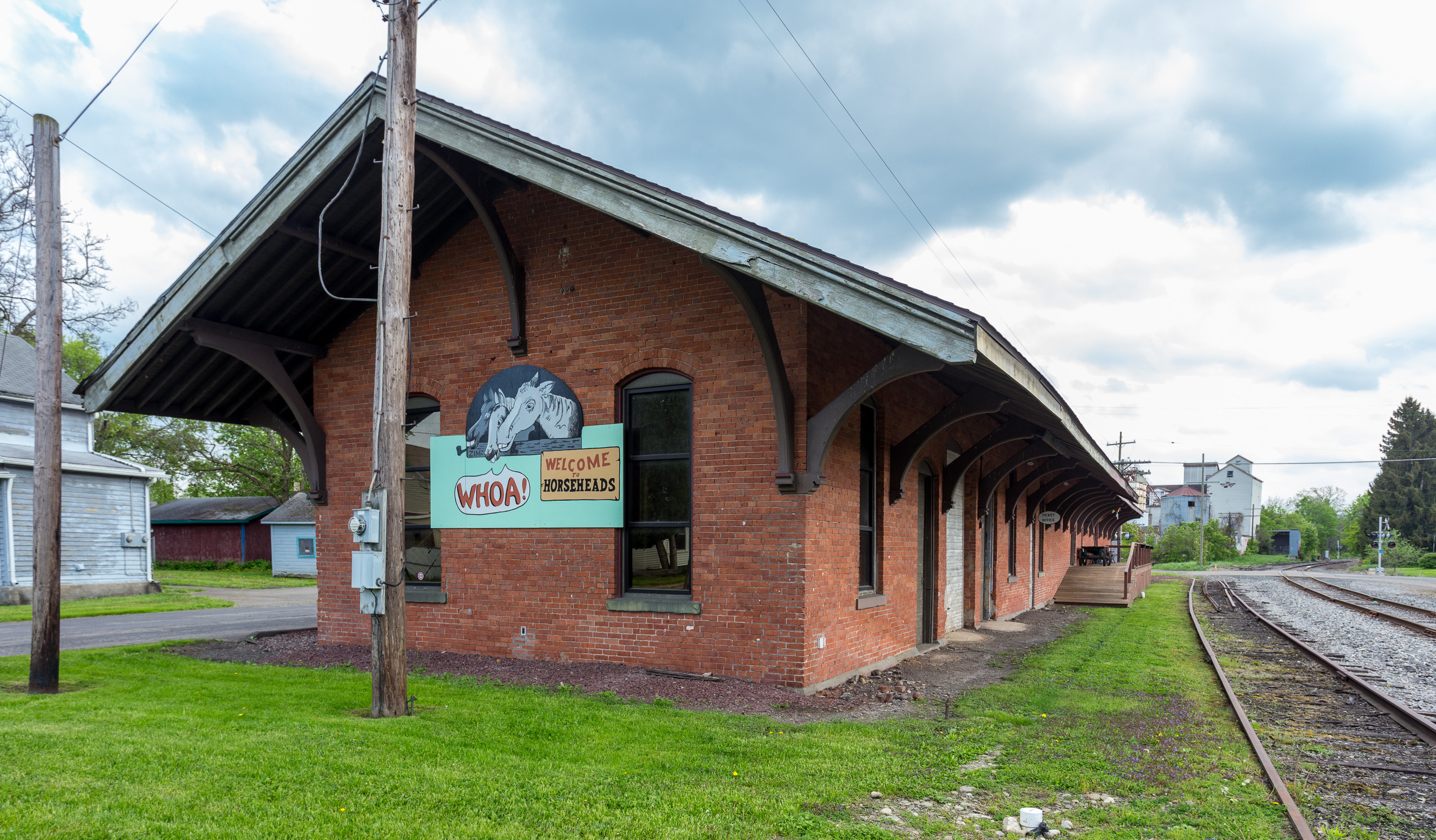
The former North Central Railway (later Pennsylvania Railroad) depot in Horseheads

In September 1779, forces under General John Sullivan marched north 450 miles (720 km) from Easton, Pennsylvania, over to Wyoming, Pennsylvania, and on up the Susquehanna River to Newtown (Elmira), then continued north through what is now known as Horseheads to the Finger Lakes region and west to Genesee, on a scorched-earth mission against Loyalists and more significantly against their Iroquois allies. They returned about three weeks later, largely on the same route.

The journey had been particularly severe and wearing upon the animals, and their food supply was found insufficient. Arriving about 6 miles (10 km) north of Fort Reid on September 24, 1779, they were obliged to dispose of a large number of sick and disabled horses. The number of horses was so great that they were quite noticeable, and the surviving Iroquois collected the skulls and arranged them in a line along the trail. From that time forward, that spot was referred to as the "Valley of the Horses' Heads" and is still known by the name given to it by the Iroquois. Today this area is part of the heartland of Upstate New York, across which thirty-five monoliths mark the path of Sullivan's troops and the locations of the Iroquois villages they razed dotting the region, erected by the New York State Education Department in 1929 to commemorate the 150th anniversary of the expedition.

The settlement of the village area began around 1830. The village was officially incorporated in 1839 as the "Village of Fairport," due to its location on the Chemung Canal, but changed its name back to "Horseheads" in 1845. In 1885, it was renamed "North Elmira" but the village resumed the original name, "Horseheads" in 1886.

The village was once a port on the Chemung Canal.

The Chemung Railway Depot-Horseheads, Hanover Square Historic District, Horseheads 1855 Extension Historic District, Teal Park, and Zimmerman House are listed on the National Register of Historic Places.

The village is where high speed rail cars will be built for the Brightline West train from Los Angeles to Las Vegas. Siemens Mobility has been selected to build the rail cars, and is building its factory there, announced in September 2024. A $60 million facility of about 300,000 square feet (28,000 m^{2}) will be built in Horseheads, and the rail line is planned to be in service by 2028, with rail cars from this plant. This constitutes the start of a new industry in the US.

== Geography ==
Horseheads village is in the Southern Tier Region of New York, 5 miles (8 km) north of downtown Elmira. It is located at a low point on the St. Lawrence Continental Divide separating the Susquehanna River watershed to the south and the Lake Ontario watershed to the north. Newtown Creek on the east side of the village flows south toward the Chemung River, a tributary of the Susquehanna, while the northernmost part of the village drains north to Catharine Creek, the main tributary of Seneca Lake, one of the Finger Lakes.

According to the United States Census Bureau, the village has a total area of 3.9 square miles (10.1 km^{2}), of which 0.02 square miles (0.04 km^{2}), or 0.38%, is water.

New York State Route 17 and Interstate 86 pass through the village, with access from exits 52 and 53. New York State Route 14, a north-south highway, intersects State Route 17 in the village. New York State Route 13 intersects State Route 17 east of the village.

== Demographics ==
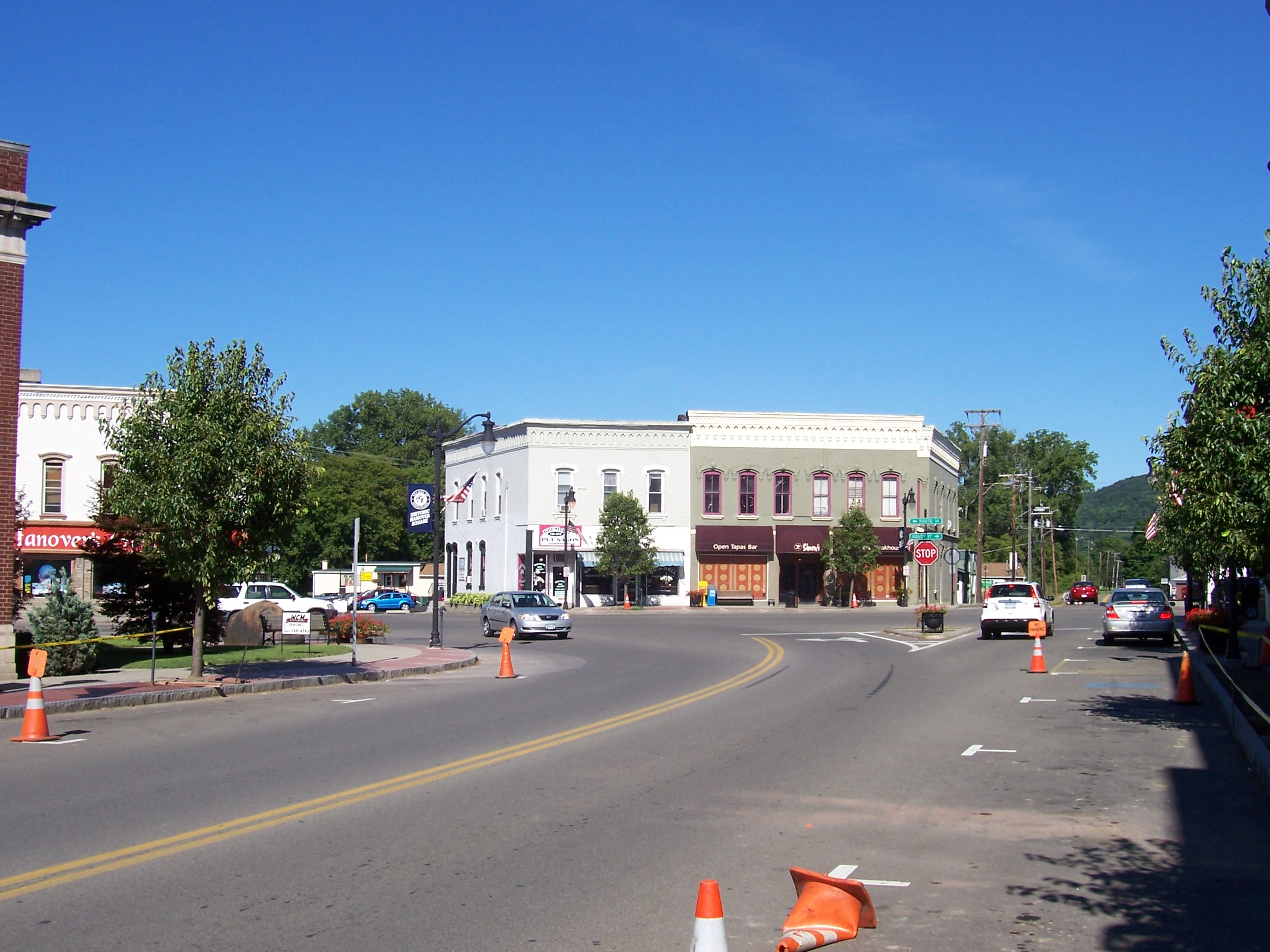
Hanover Square is the village's commercial focal point.

Historical population
| Census | Pop. | Note | %± |
|---|---|---|---|
| 1870 | 1,410 | | — |
| 1880 | 1,684 | | 19.4% |
| 1890 | 1,716 | | 1.9% |
| 1900 | 1,901 | | 10.8% |
| 1910 | 1,778 | | −6.5% |
| 1920 | 2,078 | | 16.9% |
| 1930 | 2,430 | | 16.9% |
| 1940 | 2,570 | | 5.8% |
| 1950 | 3,606 | | 40.3% |
| 1960 | 7,207 | | 99.9% |
| 1970 | 7,989 | | 10.9% |
| 1980 | 7,348 | | −8.0% |
| 1990 | 6,802 | | −7.4% |
| 2000 | 6,452 | | −5.1% |
| 2010 | 6,461 | | 0.1% |
| 2020 | 6,606 | | 2.2% |
U.S. Decennial Census

As of the census of 2000, there were 6,452 people, 2,862 households, and 1,800 families residing in the village. The population density was 1,666.4 inhabitants per square mile (643.4/km^{2}). There were 3,007 housing units at an average density of 776.6 per square mile (299.8/km^{2}). The racial makeup of the village was 95.57% White, 1.30% Black or African American, 0.12% Native American, 1.92% Asian, 0.02% Pacific Islander, 0.20% from other races, and 0.87% from two or more races. Hispanic or Latino of any race were 0.91% of the population.

There were 2,862 households, out of which 26.3% had children under the age of 18 living with them, 47.9% were married couples living together, 11.9% had a female householder with no husband present, and 37.1% were non-families. 32.3% of all households were made up of individuals, and 15.4% had someone living alone who was 65 years of age or older. The average household size was 2.24 and the average family size was 2.82.

In the village, the population was spread out, with 22.6% under the age of 18, 7.0% from 18 to 24, 26.3% from 25 to 44, 23.1% from 45 to 64, and 21.0% who were 65 years of age or older. The median age was 41 years. For every 100 females, there were 86.6 males. For every 100 females age 18 and over, there were 84.1 males.

The median income for a household in the village was $35,915, and the median income for a family was $44,971. Males had a median income of $36,774 versus $22,776 for females. The per capita income for the village was $20,779. About 4.6% of families and 8.8% of the population were below the poverty line, including 10.9% of those under age 18 and 5.6% of those age 65 or over.

== Education ==
The school district for Horseheads Village is Horseheads Central School District.
