= Hanover Square Historic District (Horseheads, New York) =

Historic district in New York, United States

- U.S. National Register of Historic Places
- U.S. Historic district
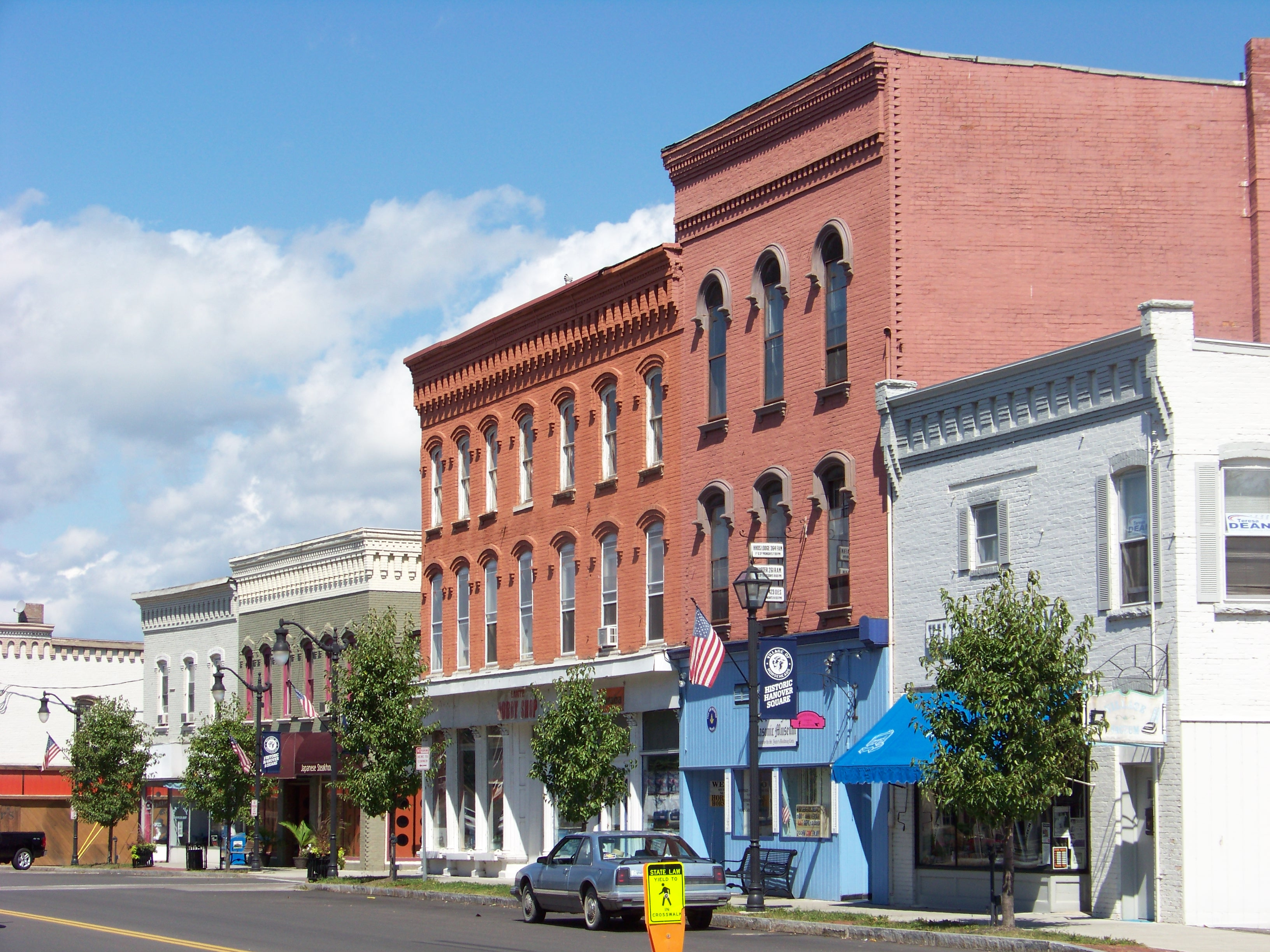

- Location within New York Location within the United States
- Location: Horseheads, New York
- Coordinates: 42°10′3″N 76°49′16″W
- Built: 1862
- Architect: Multiple
- Architectural style: Colonial Revival, Other, Romanesque
- NRHP reference No.: 82001094
- Added to NRHP: October 29, 1982

The Hanover Square Historic District is a downtown business district in Horseheads, New York. Most of the buildings in the district were built between 1862 and 1882 in the Romanesque Revival style. The homogeneity of the district is owed to the fact that a fire levelled the town in 1862, allowing for redevelopment in this manner. The brick buildings, with their decorative corbelling, are remarkably intact.

The district was added to the National Register of Historic Places in 1982.

== History ==
There was a small village built around a large rock deposited by a glacier by the time General John Sullivan came to the area during the Sullivan Expedition. The Town of Horseheads grew from this small settlement around the rock, into a larger town. Later expansions away from the square produced the 1855 Extension Historic District.

== Gallery ==
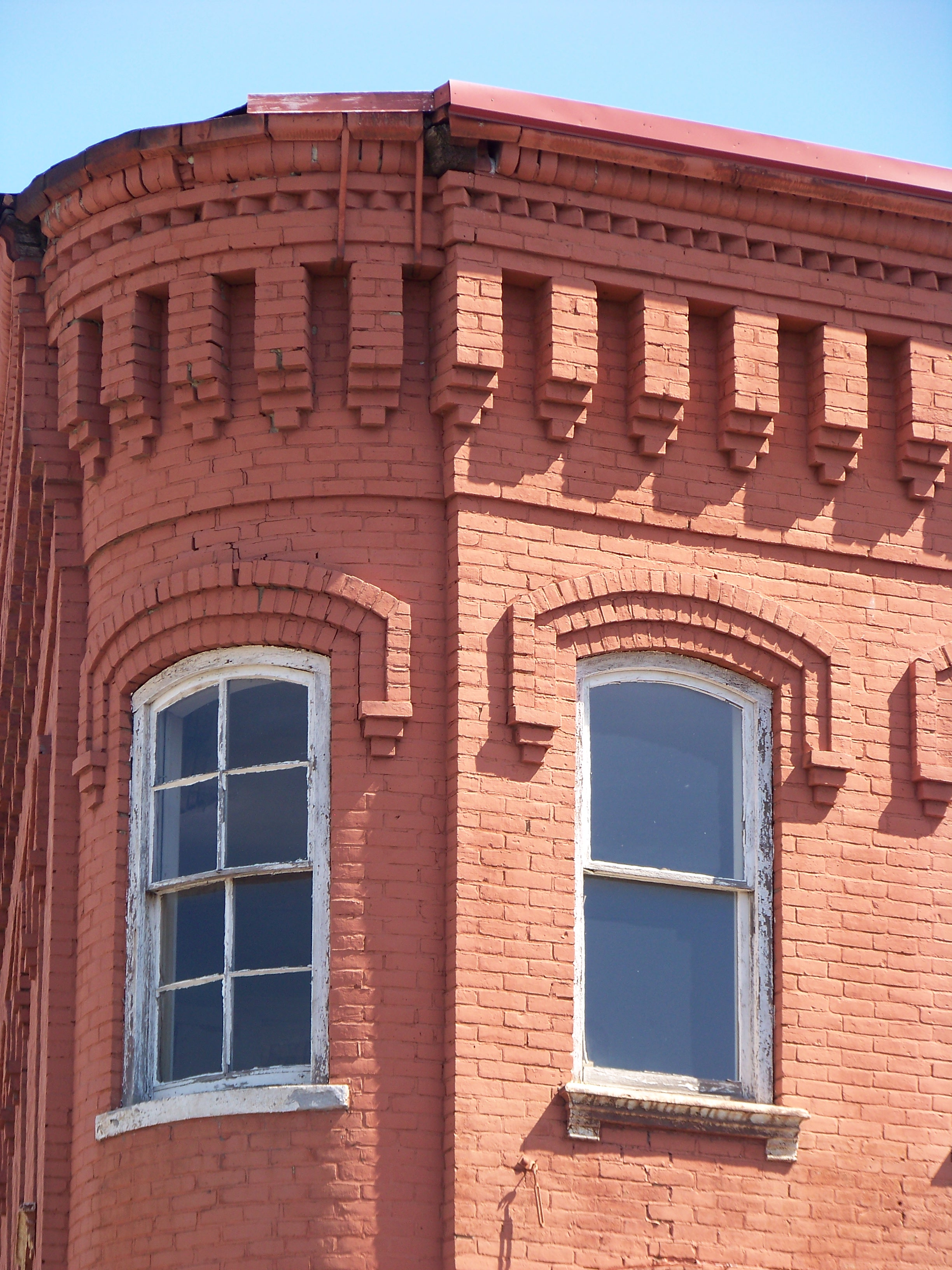
Decorative corbelling on a building in the district

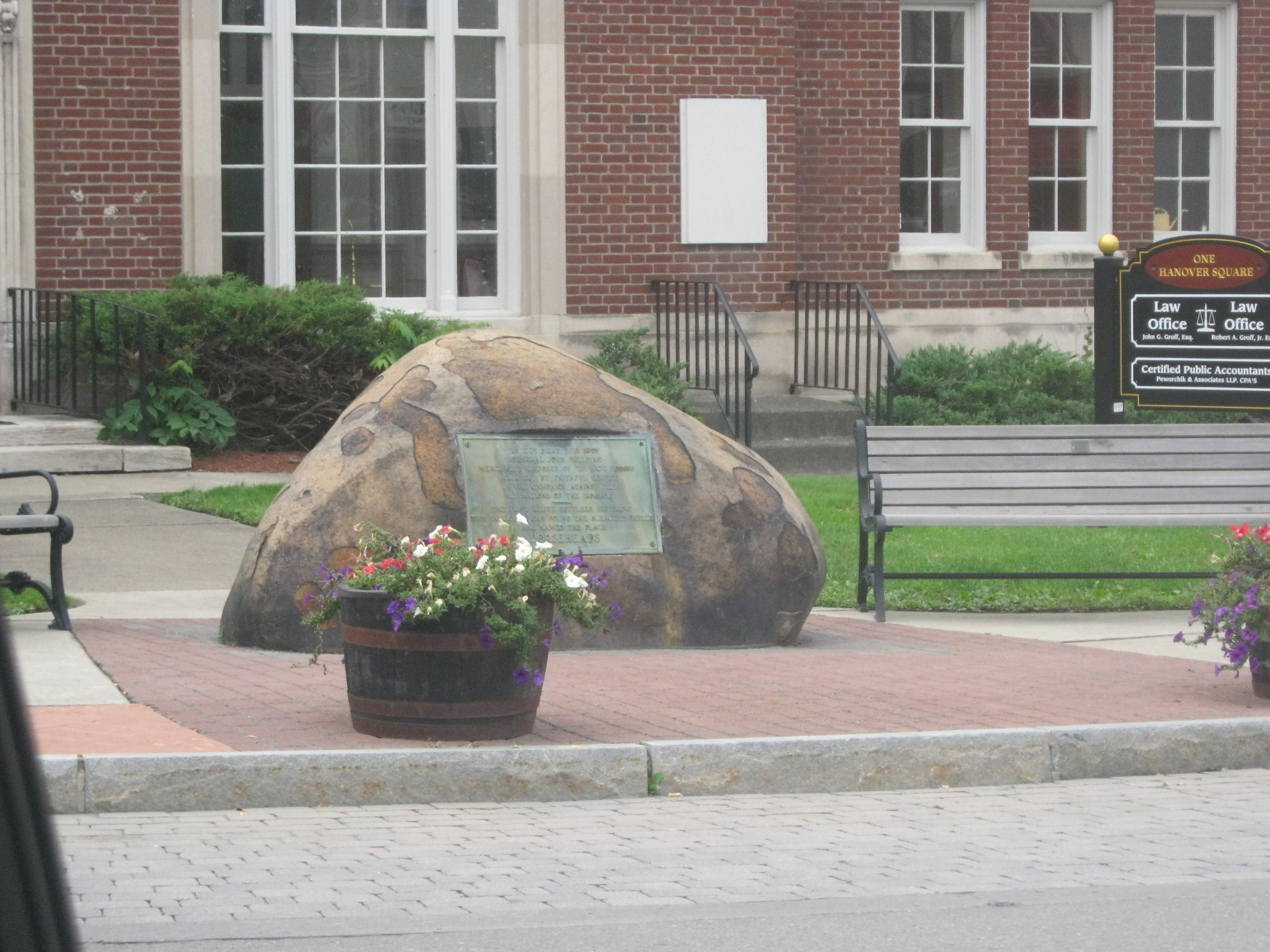
Rock deposited by glaciers in the center of the square
