= Horseheads station =

- Chemung Railway Depot--Horseheads
- U.S. National Register of Historic Places
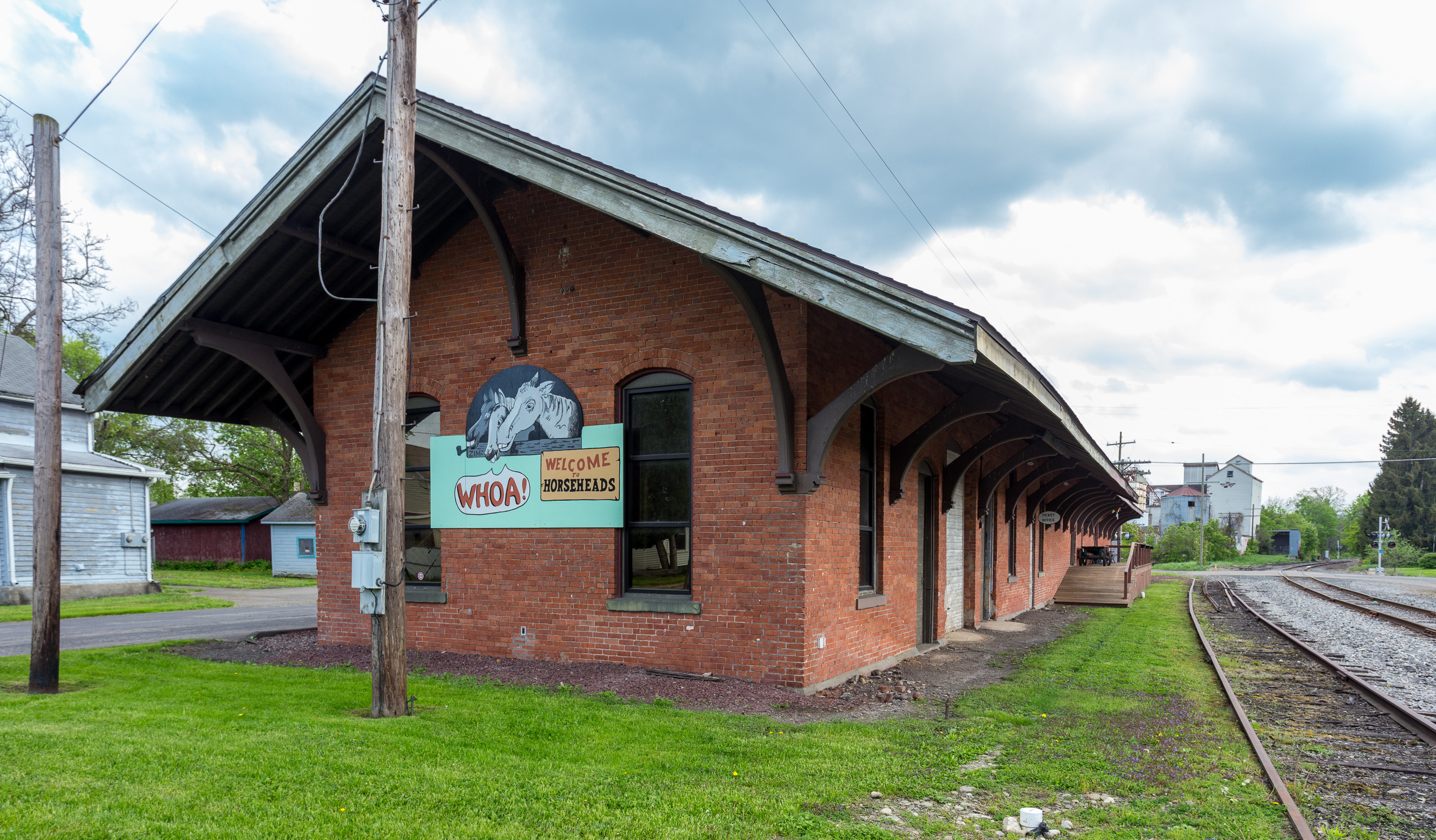

- Location within New York Location within the United States
- Location: 312 W. Broad St., Horseheads, New York
- Coordinates: 42.1666°N 76.8238°W
- Built: 1866
- Architectural style: Italianate
- NRHP reference No.: 96001442
- Added to NRHP: December 12, 1996

Horseheads is a historic railway depot located at Horseheads, Chemung County, New York. It was built in 1866 by the Northern Central Railway (NCRY). The train station was operated by the NCRY and its successor, the Pennsylvania Railroad, until 1956. The Italianate style building is significant architecturally and historically as a representative of a 19th-century railroad depot.

After being closed by the railroad, the depot was purchased by the local feed mill, where it was used for storage for many decades until it was sold to be used as a retail location in 1994. The interior space has been slightly modified and the original wood floors have been replaced by cement ones, but it remains mostly as built. The Horseheads Historical Society purchased the depot in 1995 and started the restoration process in 1997. The new depot museum officially opened on September 18, 1999. The Historical Society now operates a museum and small rental space in the station.

It was added to the National Register of Historic Places in 1996 as the Chemung Railway Depot--Horseheads.

== Gallery ==
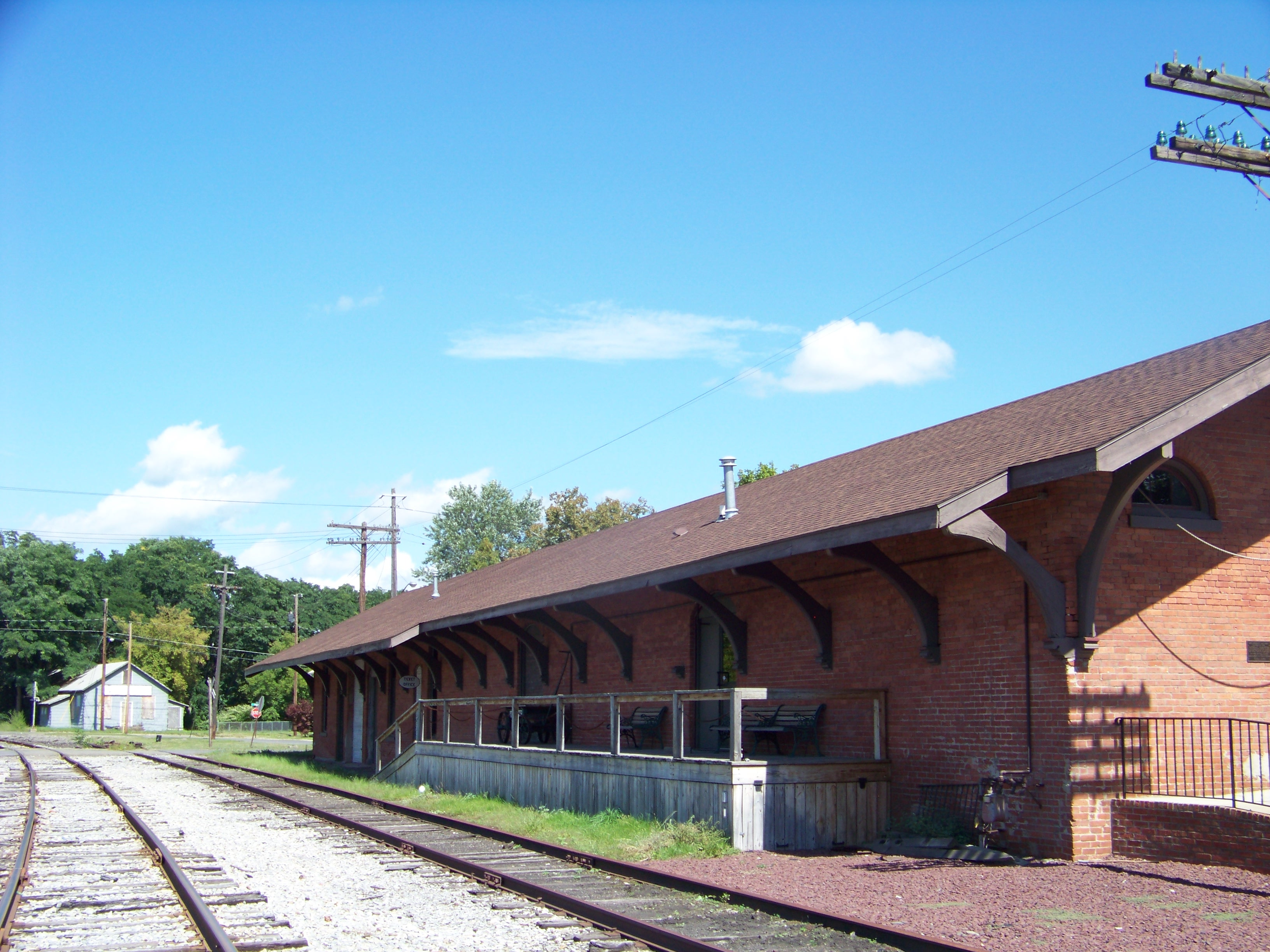
Track side

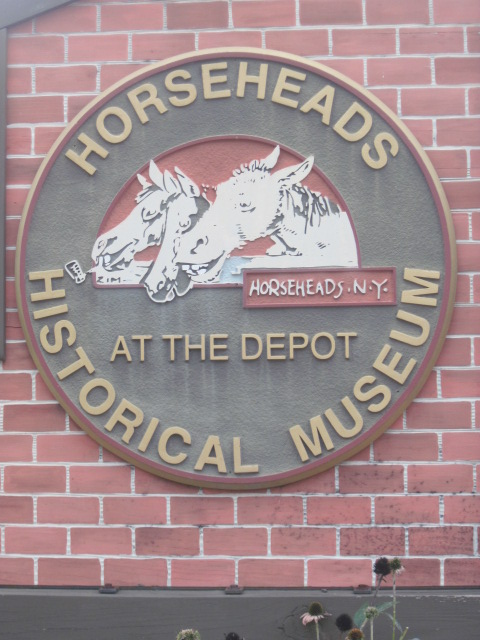
Museum sign

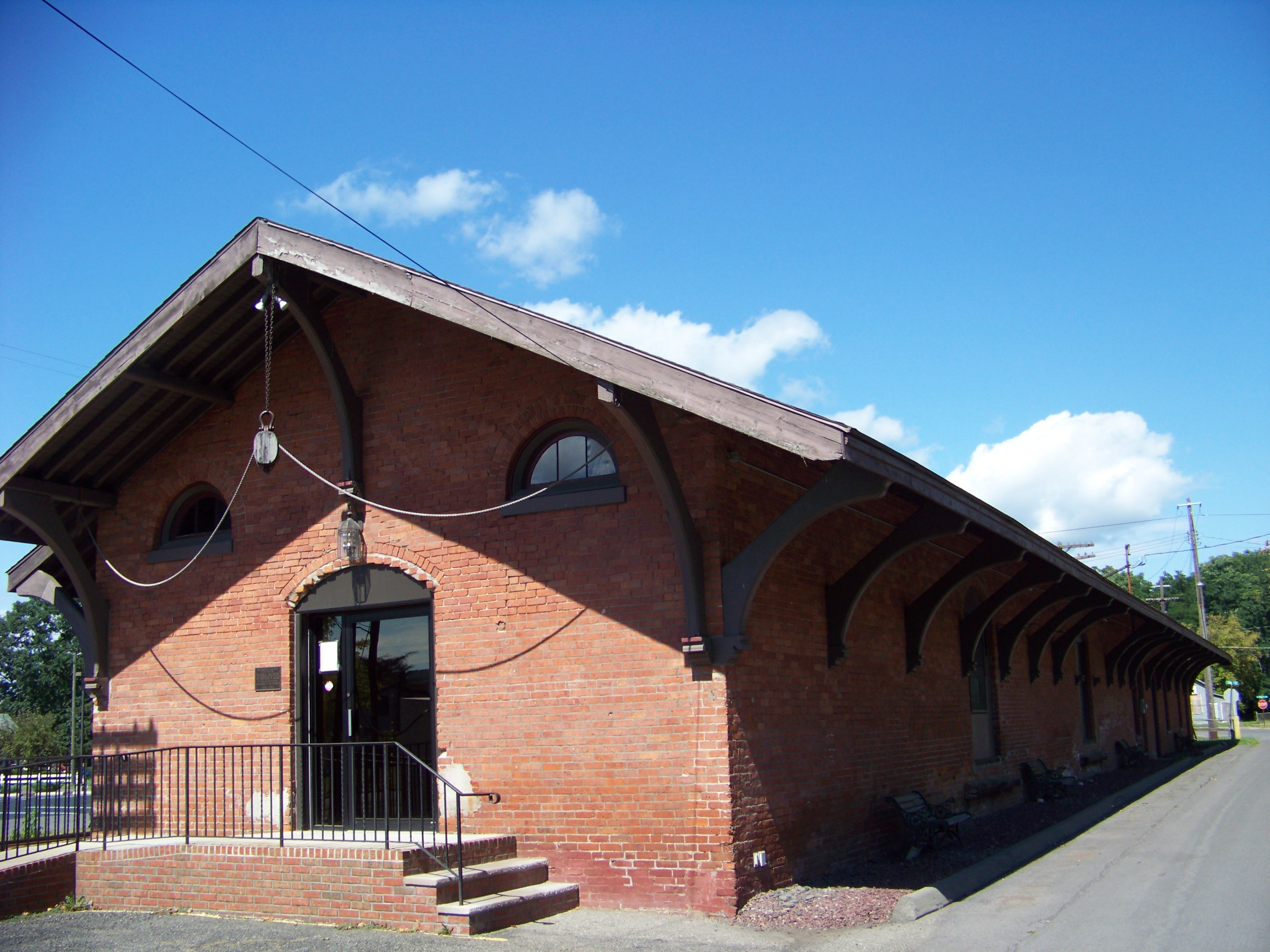

| Preceding station | Pennsylvania Railroad | Following station |
|---|---|---|
| Pine Valley toward Canandelaigua | Northern Central Railway; Susquehanna & Elmira Division | Elmira toward Harrisburg |
