= Horseheads 1855 Extension Historic District =

Historic district in New York, United States

- U.S. National Register of Historic Places
- U.S. Historic district
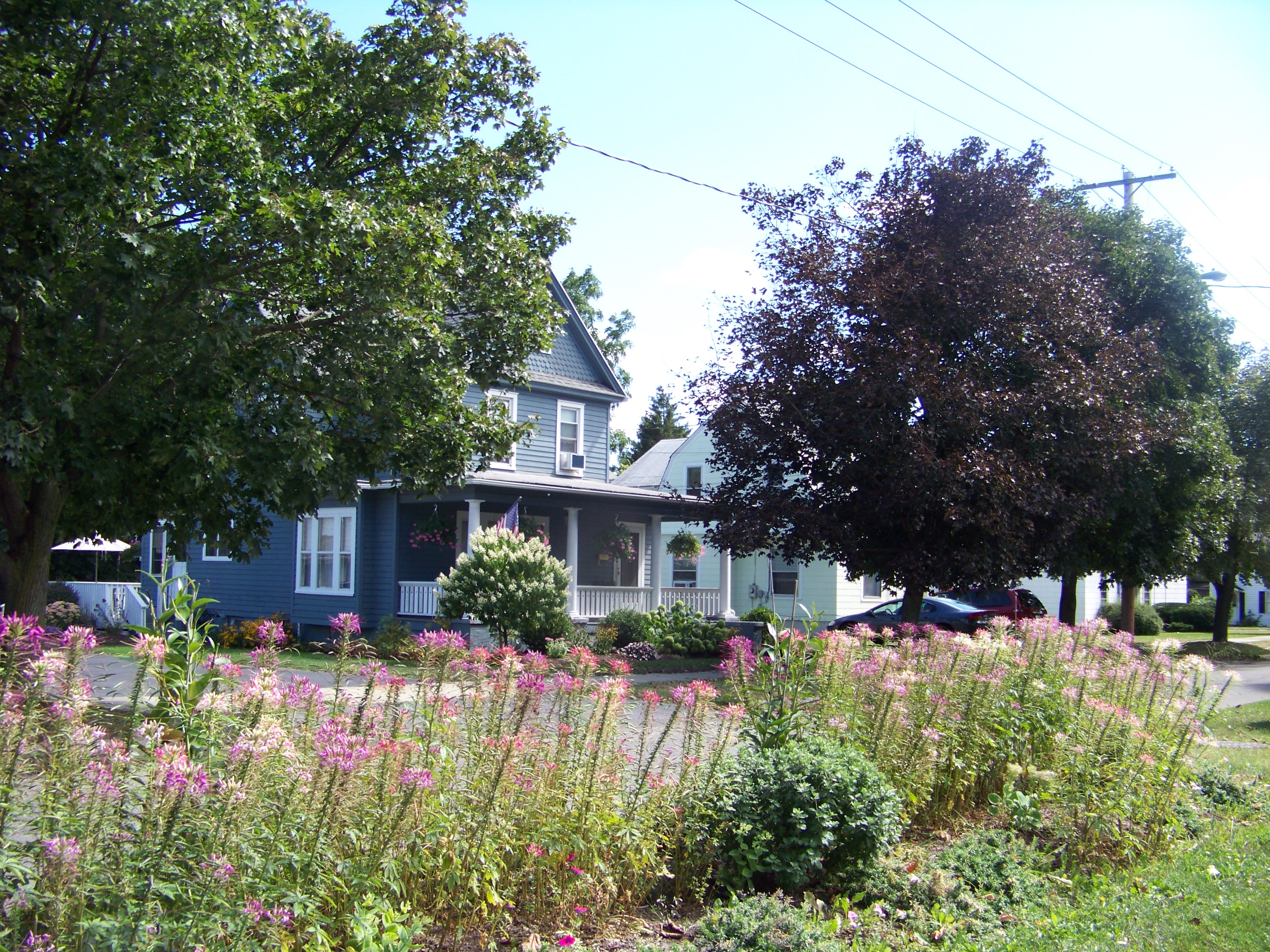

- Location within New York Location within the United States
- Location: Grand Central Ave., Fletcher, Sayre, W. Mill and Center Sts., Horseheads, New York
- Coordinates: 42°9′46″N 76°49′14″W
- Area: 11 acres (4.5 ha)
- Built: 1830
- Architect: Pierce & Bickford et al.
- Architectural style: Mid 19th Century Revival, Late 19th And Early 20th Century American Movements, Late Victorian
- NRHP reference No.: 80002597
- Added to NRHP: July 30, 1980

Horseheads 1855 Extension Historic District is a national historic district located at Horseheads in Chemung County, New York. The residential district includes a rich variety of exceptionally well preserved examples of the vernacular architectural styles once popular in such communities. The included structures reflect the diversity of architectural styles popular between 1860 and 1920.

It is adjacent to Hanover Square and Horseheads High School.

It was listed on the National Register of Historic Places in 1980.

== Gallery ==
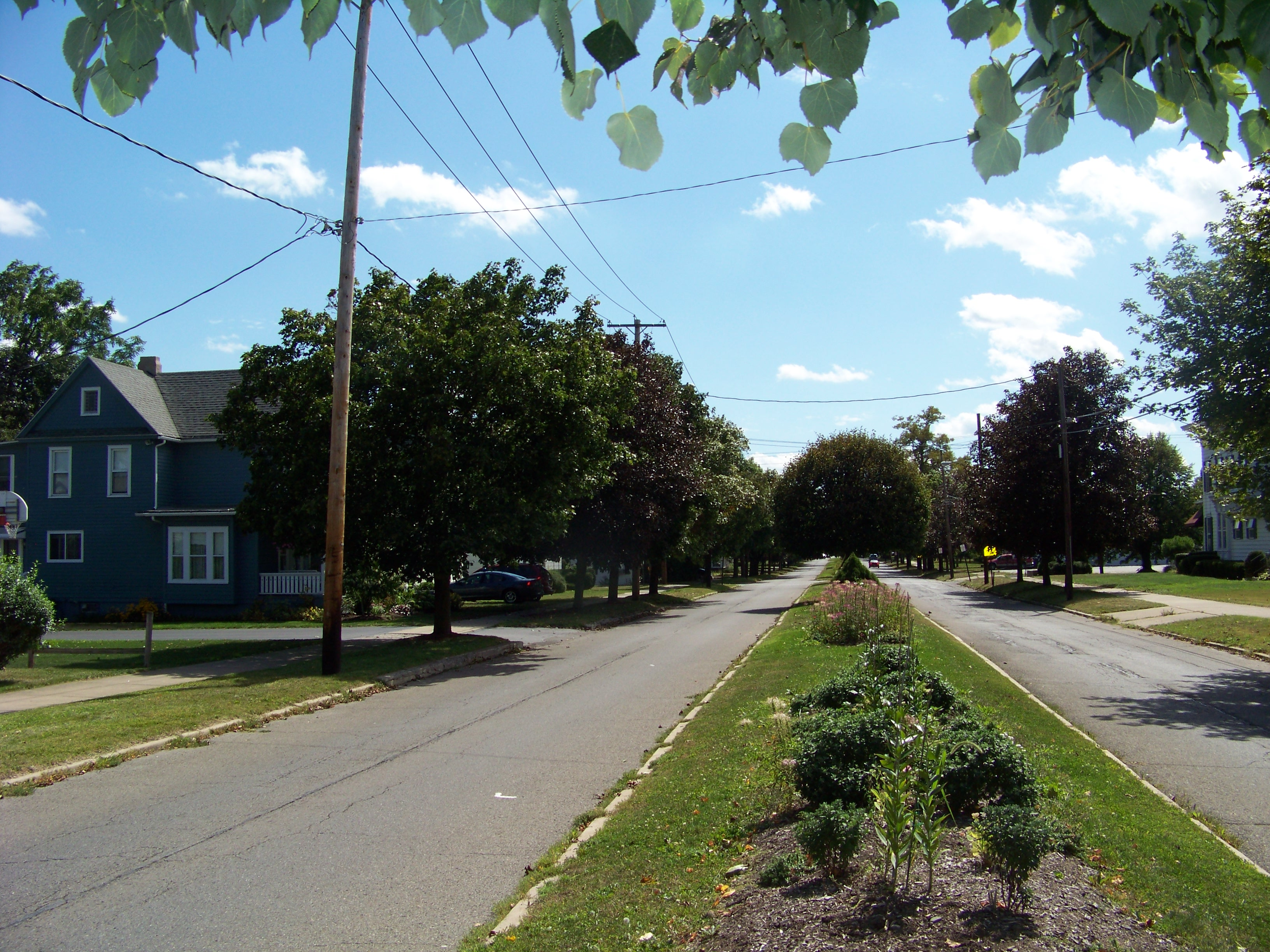

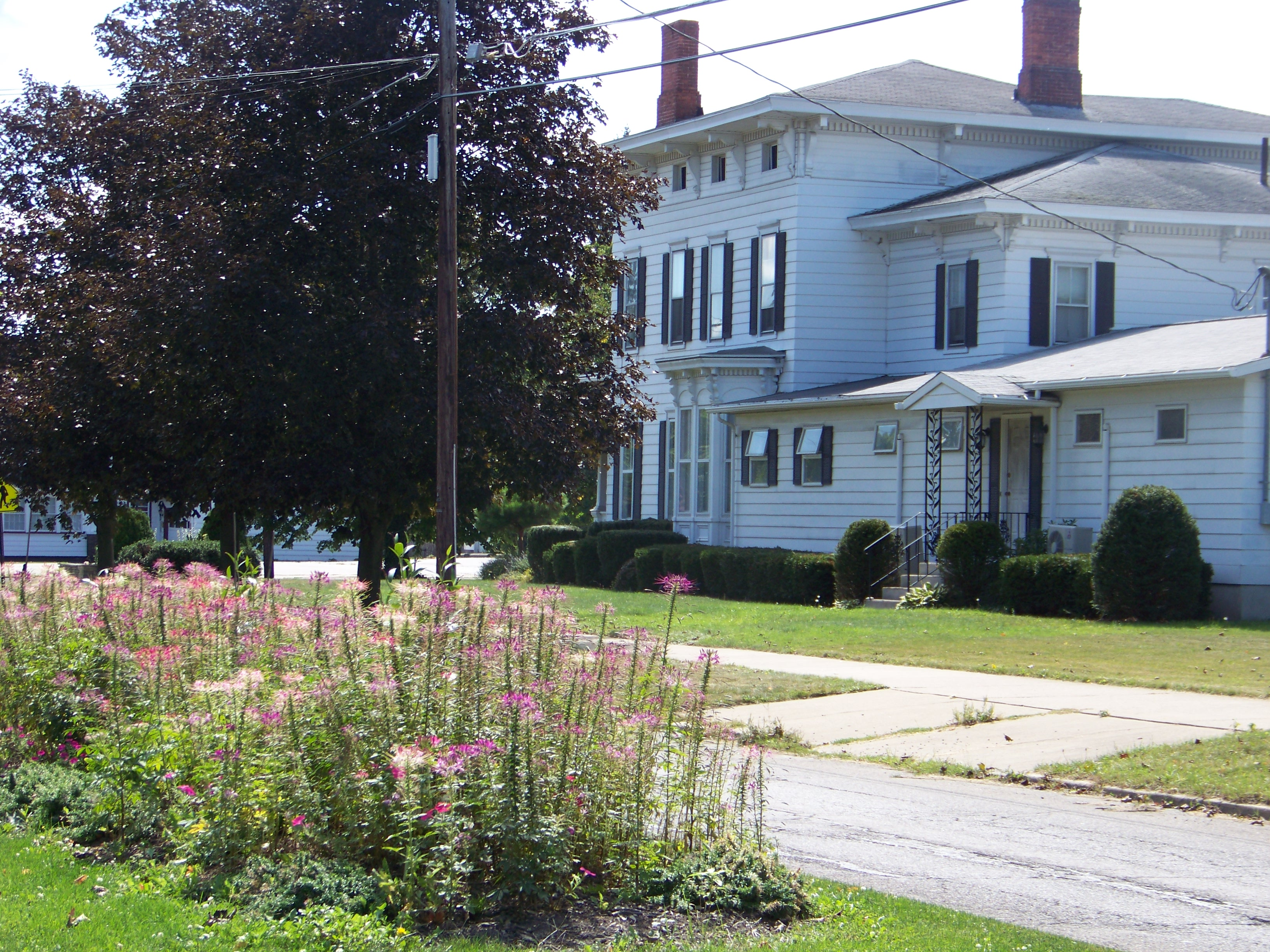
