= Hendrick Motorsports Car No. 24 =

Iconic NASCAR racecar

Hendrick Motorsports No. 24 car
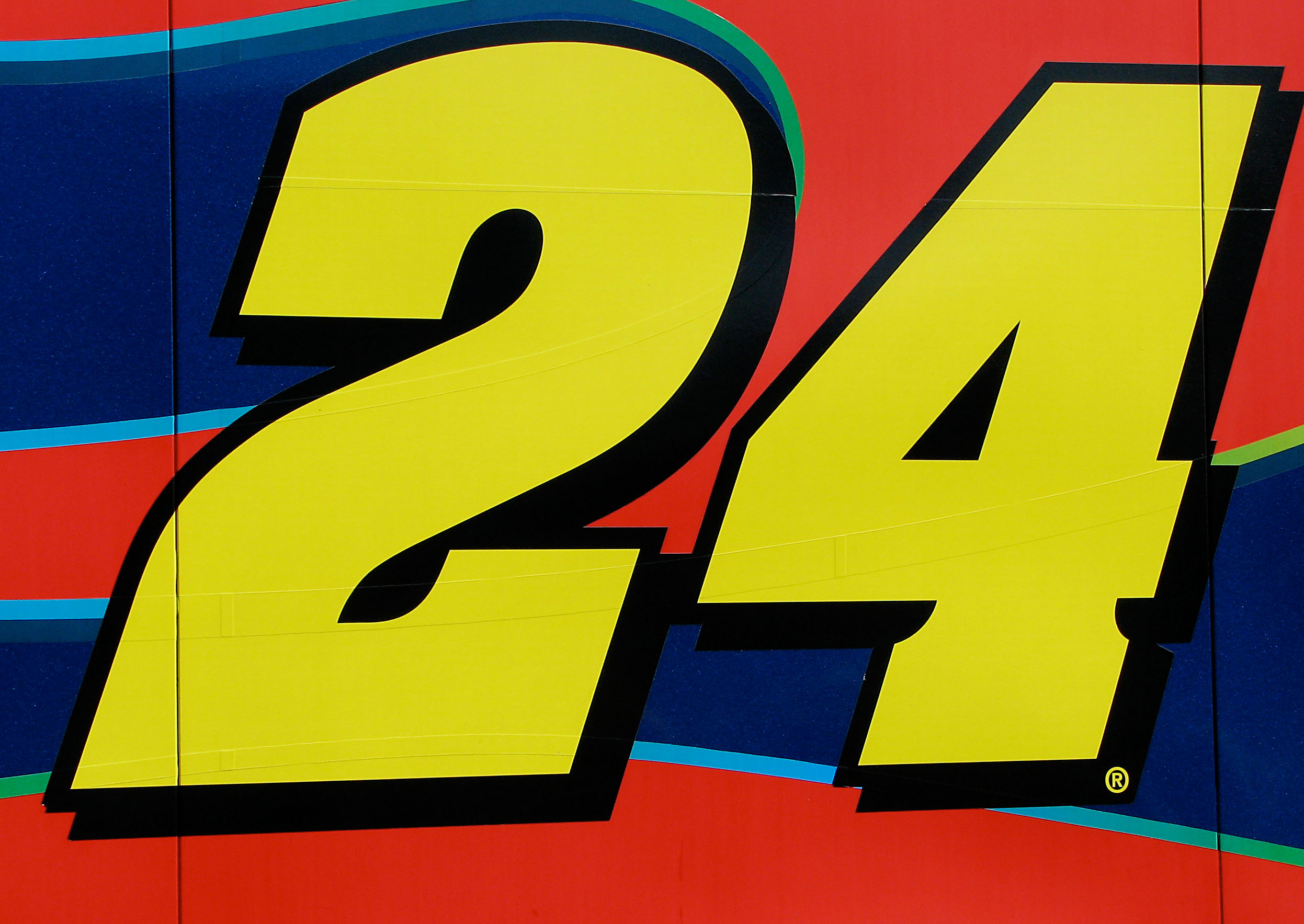
- Owners: Rick Hendrick; Linda Hendrick; Jeff Gordon
- Principal: Ray Evernham 1992-1999, Brian Whitesell 1999, Robbie Loomis 2000-2005, Steve Letarte 2005-2010, Alan Gustafson 2011-2017, Darian Grubb 2018, Chad Knaus 2019-2020, Rudy Fugle 2021-2026, Adam Wall 2027-present
- Base: 4400 Papa Joe Hendrick Blvd, Concord, North Carolina, 28262
- Series: NASCAR Cup Series
- Race drivers: Jeff Gordon (1992–2015); Chase Elliott (2016–2017); William Byron (2018–present)
- Manufacturer: Chevrolet
- Opened: 1992

Career
- Debut: 1992 Hooters 500 (Atlanta)
- Latest race: 2026 Season Finale 400 (Homestead)
- Drivers' Championships: 4
- Race victories: 110
- Pole positions: 100

The Hendrick Motorsports No. 24 car is a NASCAR Cup Series team that has been active since 1992. The team began with driver Jeff Gordon, who spent almost his entire full-time Cup Series career behind the wheel of the No. 24 between 1992 and 2015. Gordon won 93 points-paying races, the most of any driver in NASCAR's modern era, and four series championships before retiring from full-time racing in 2015. After Gordon's retirement the No. 24 was driven by Chase Elliott in 2016 and 2017. Elliott earned a spot in the NASCAR playoffs both seasons but failed to win a points-paying race. Since 2018, the No. 24 has been driven by William Byron after Kasey Khane left Hendrick Motorsports and Chase Elliott was moved to the No. 9 car. Gordon, Elliott, and Byron each earned Cup Series Rookie of the Year honors while using the No. 24.

== History ==
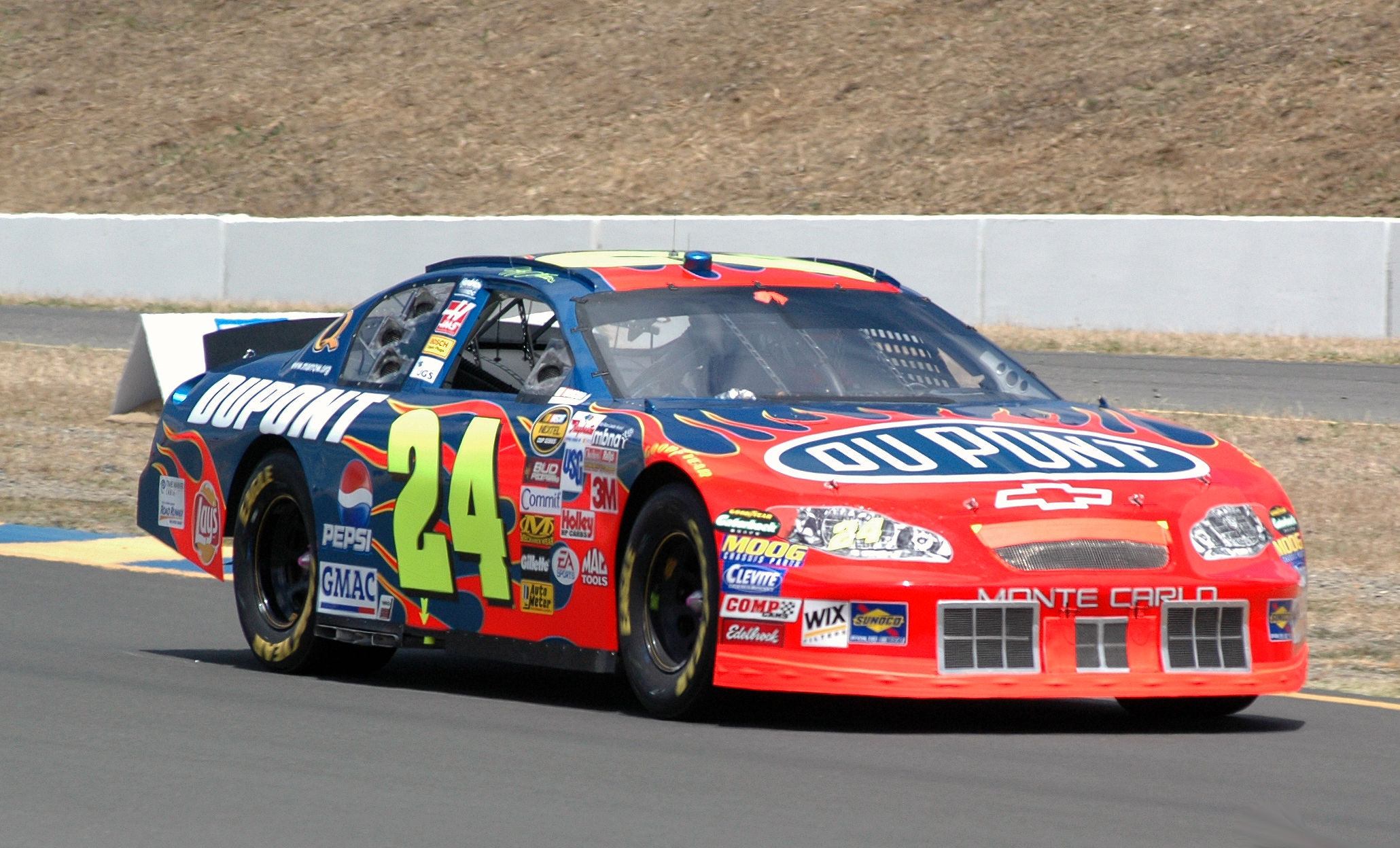
Jeff Gordon's No. 24 DuPont Chevrolet at Sonoma in 2005

=== Jeff Gordon (1992–2015) ===
Gordon and his crew chief, Ray Evernham, were signed away from Bill Davis Racing after Rick Hendrick watched Gordon drive BDR's No.1 Ford to his first Busch Series victory at Atlanta Motor Speedway in March 1992. The car number was originally intended to be No. 46, a Hendrick car driven by Greg Sacks for the filming of Days of Thunder in 1989 and 1990, but was changed after a licensing conflict with Paramount Pictures. No. 24 was selected due to its insignificance in NASCAR history prior to Gordon; at the time no driver had ever won a Cup race in the No. 24.

Gordon debuted in the 1992 Hooters 500, using his now-iconic DuPont rainbow paint scheme designed by Sam Bass, qualifying 21st and finishing 31st after a crash. The team went full-time in 1993 with Ray Evernham serving as crew chief. Gordon won his Twin 125 qualifying race at Daytona and finished fifth in the Daytona 500. He finished 14th in points and won Cup Series Rookie of the Year. In 1994, Gordon scored his first Winston Cup victory in the Coca-Cola 600, won the inaugural Brickyard 400 at Indianapolis, and finished the season eighth in points. Gordon won the 1995 Winston Cup championship, and finished second behind Hendrick teammate Terry Labonte in 1996.

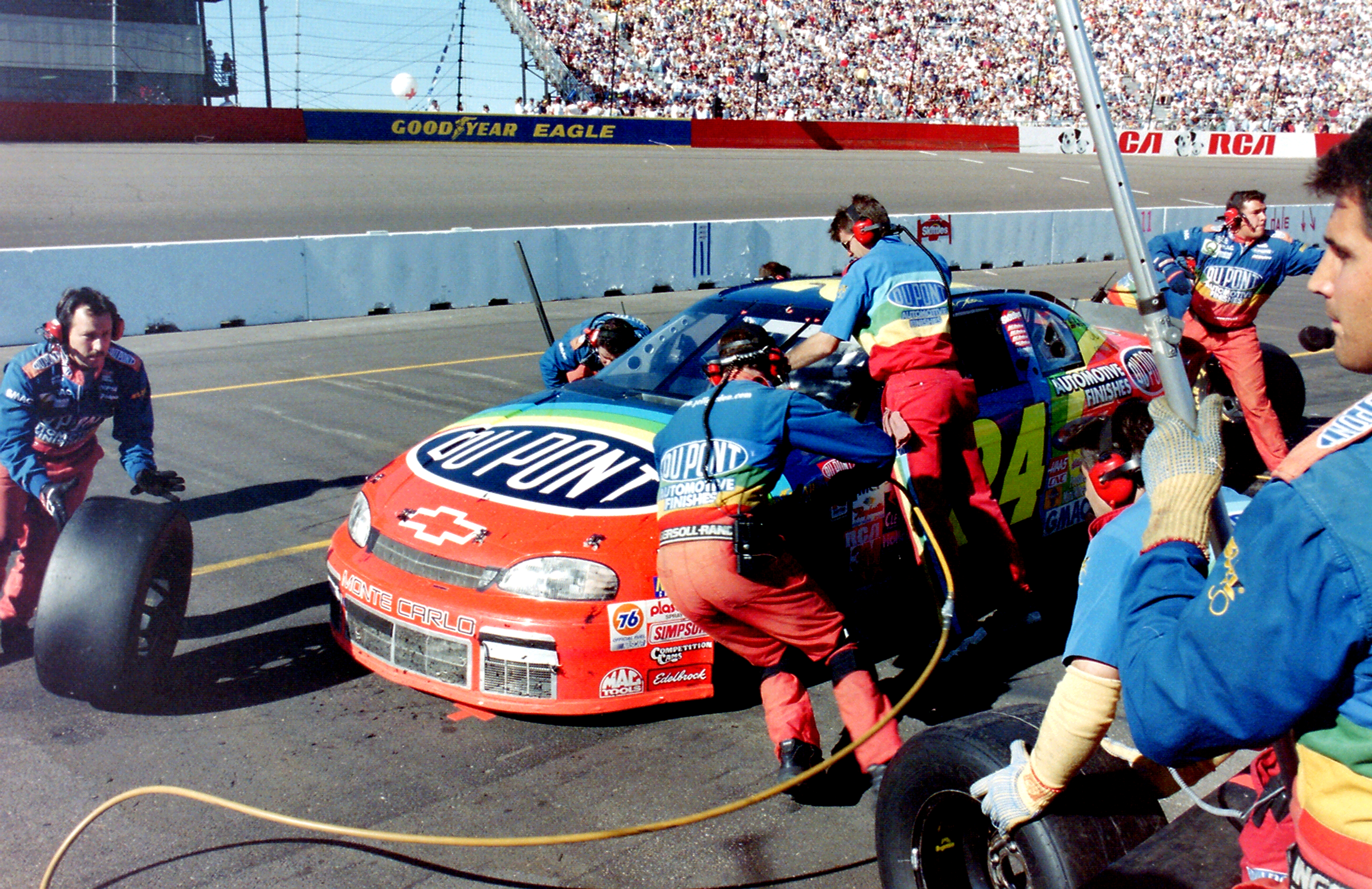
Ray Evernham's "Rainbow Warriors" in 1997

Throughout the mid-90s, Gordon and Evernham's team became known as the "Rainbow Warriors," a nickname derived from the No. 24's colorful paint scheme and the similarly bright jumpsuits worn by the team's pit crew. Evernham became famous for his innovation improving the duration and efficiency of pit stops. Instead of using team mechanics as his pit crew, as was customary at the time, Evernham created a group of specialists (often former athletes) who trained using choreography, agility exercises, and weight lifting. The team studied film between races to identify spots for improvement. Evernham is largely credited with reducing the expected duration of a four-tire pit stop from around 20 seconds to under 15.

Gordon won his second championship in 1997, winning three of NASCAR's crown jewel races (the Daytona 500, Coca-Cola 600, and Southern 500). He won his second consecutive and third overall title in 1998, tying Richard Petty's modern-era record for wins in a season with 13. The following season, Gordon again won the Daytona 500, but the No. 24 team struggled with consistency and failed to win a third straight title. Crew chief Ray Evernham left the team to assist in Dodge's pending return to NASCAR, and was replaced by Brian Whitesell, who guided Gordon to wins in his first two races as crew chief. At the end of the season, Gordon signed a "lifetime" contract with Hendrick Motorsports, giving him partial ownership of the team.

Robbie Loomis replaced Brian Whitesell (who was promoted to team manager) in 2000, a season which saw Gordon score his 50th career victory at Talladega and finish ninth in points. In 2001, the No. 24 car unveiled a new blue- and red-flamed paint scheme, also designed by Bass, as lead sponsor DuPont expanded its marketing beyond automotive finishes. Gordon bounced back with six wins, six poles, and 24 top 10 finishes, winning his fourth championship.

In 2002, Gordon became car owner for rookie Jimmie Johnson's No. 48 Lowe's Chevrolet, a team that has since tied a NASCAR record with seven Cup Series championships. After a pair of top-five points finishes in 2003 and 2004, Gordon won three of the first nine races in 2005, including his third Daytona 500 win. However, Gordon ultimately missed the Chase for the Nextel Cup and finished 11th in points, the first time since his rookie year he finished outside the top 10. The following season was more productive for Gordon and new crew chief Steve Letarte, returning to the Chase and finishing sixth in points. In 2007, despite winning six races and scoring a modern-era record 30 top-10 finishes, Gordon finished second in points to teammate Johnson. Gordon returned to the Chase in 2008, but failed to win a race for the first time since his rookie year. Following the 2008 season, Gordon appeared on The Today Show to unveil his new "Firestorm" paint scheme for 2009 and beyond, which expanded the car's red flames and replaced the blue trim with black. Gordon broke a 47-race winless drought on April 4, 2009 at Texas, his first win at the track.

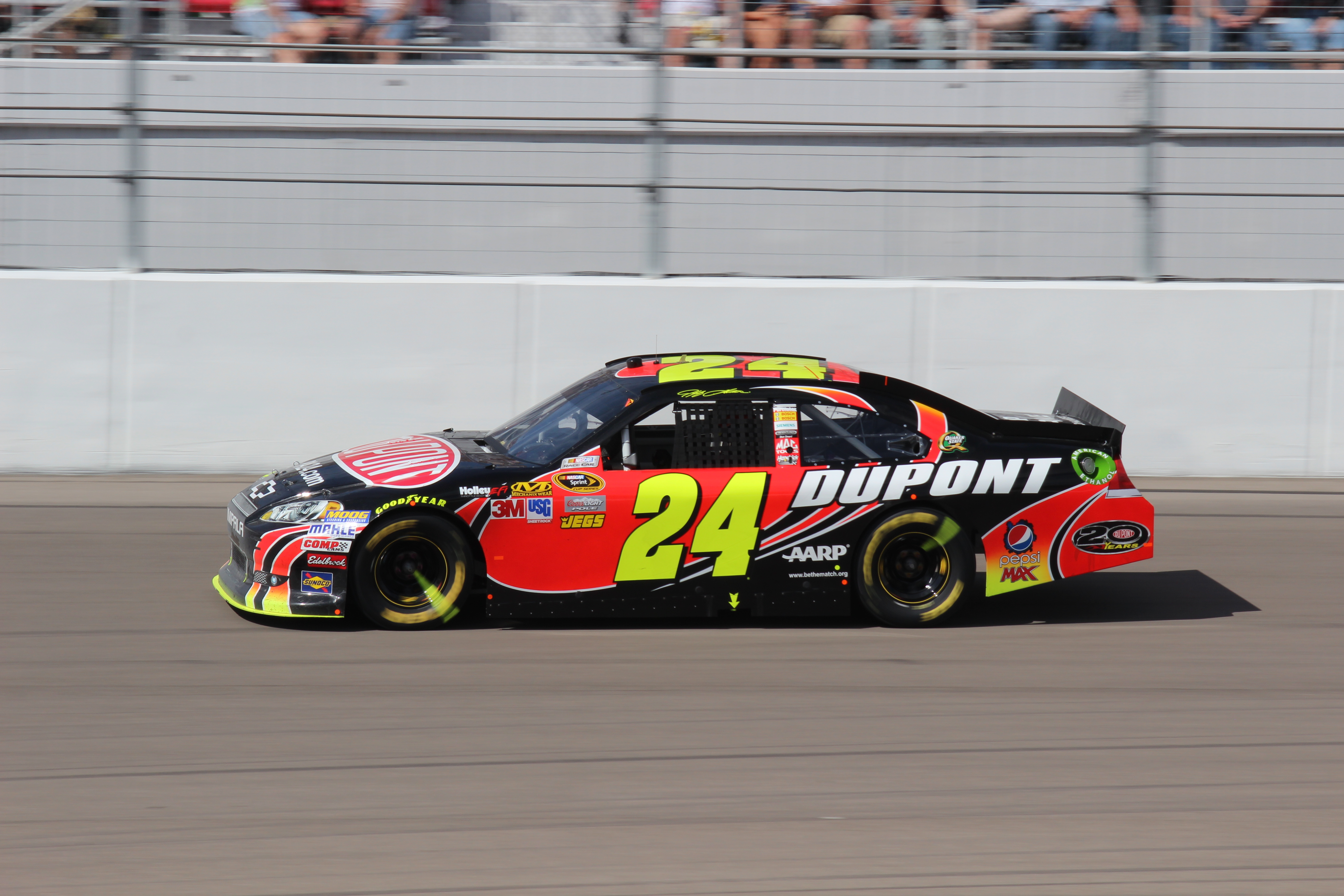
Jeff Gordon's No. 24 DuPont Chevrolet at Las Vegas in 2012, the No. 24's 20th and final season of DuPont sponsorship

At the start of the 2011 season, a HMS organizational shuffle saw Gordon, the No. 24 and his sponsors move to the 5/88 shop, with Mark Martin's former crew chief Alan Gustafson becoming crew chief of the No. 24 team. The same year, AARP became the team's primary sponsor, partnering with Gordon to form the "Drive to End Hunger" initiative. Pepsi continued its associate sponsor deal, and DuPont scaled back to 14 races as primary sponsor. Gordon won three races and finished eighth in points. An inconsistent 2012 season meant Gordon needed a late-season win at Pocono to sneak into the Chase. Weeks later, Gordon, upset about an earlier altercation, intentionally wrecked championship contender Clint Bowyer during the final laps of the AdvoCare 500 and was fined $100,000. Gordon ended the season with Hendrick Motorsports' first Cup Series win at Homestead-Miami Speedway. This was also the final race of a 20-year relationship between the No. 24 team and DuPont; Axalta Coating Systems replaced DuPont's 14-race sponsorship.

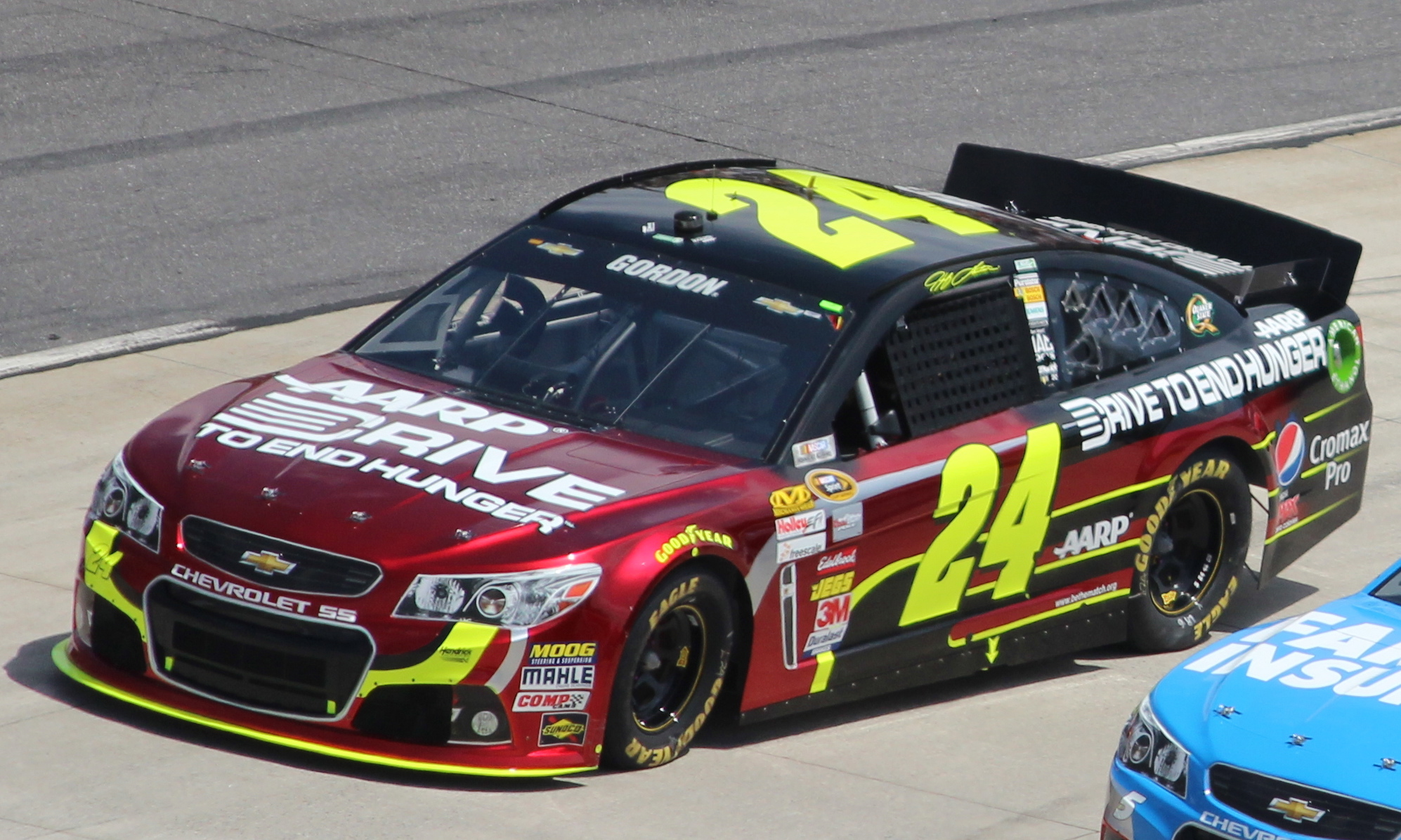
Jeff Gordon's No. 24 AARP Drive to End Hunger Chevrolet SS in 2013

Gordon was added to the 2013 Chase following "Spingate" at Richmond, but failed to win his fifth Cup title. The following season, Gordon was in position to reach the championship round until late-race shuffling at Phoenix left him just short.

On January 22, 2015, Gordon announced the upcoming season would be his final as a full-time Cup Series driver. 3M signed on to sponsor the No. 24 for 11 races over three seasons, joining AARP and Axalta as primary sponsors. Gordon raced his famous rainbow paint scheme for the final time in the 2015 Irwin Tools Night Race; a loose wheel resulted in a 26th-place finish. Gordon secured a spot in the championship round by winning at Martinsville, breaking a 39-race winless streak in what would be his final Cup Series victory. Axalta unveiled a special silver paint scheme to commemorate Gordon's career at Homestead, and Hendrick's other three cars raced with yellow number decals to honor Gordon. Gordon finished sixth in the race and third in the final points standings. Gordon returned as a part-time Cup Series driver in 2016, filling in for an injured Dale Earnhardt Jr. in the No. 88 car.

=== Chase Elliott (2016–2017) ===
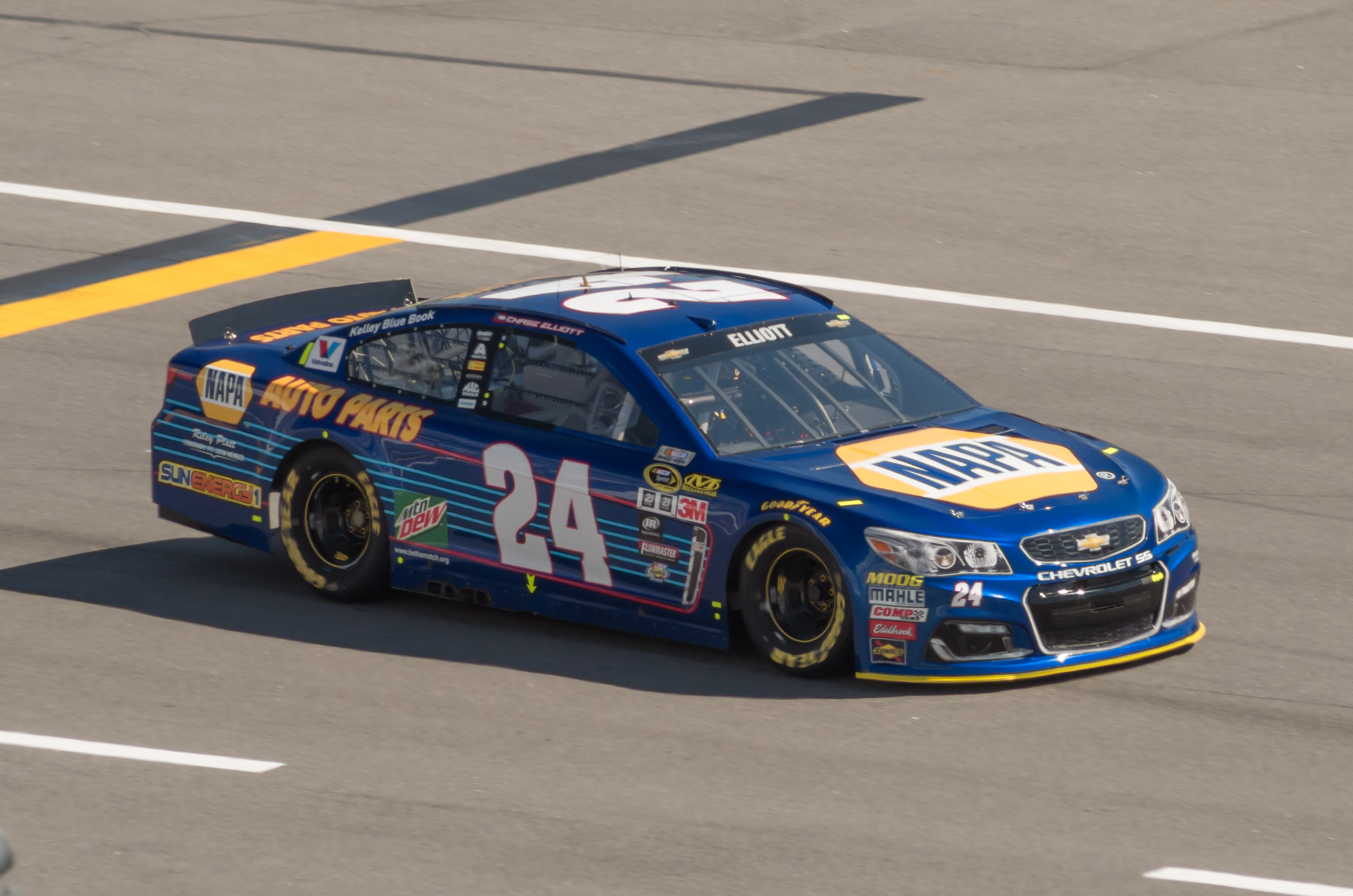
Chase Elliott at Daytona International Speedway in 2016

In 2016, Hendrick development driver Chase Elliott became the second driver to race the No. 24 car for Hendrick Motorsports. The team's primary sponsor became NAPA Auto Parts, which had previously sponsored Elliott in the Xfinity Series (3M scaled back its sponsorship and Axalta moved to the No. 88 team). Elliott won the pole in his first Daytona 500 start, but finished 37th after an early crash. Despite a winless season, Elliott made the Chase and won Cup Series Rookie of the Year.

After a fifth-place finish in 2017, Hendrick Motorsports announced the No. 24 would be renumbered to No. 9, allowing Elliott to drive the same car number his father Bill raced for 20 years. Instead of retiring the No. 24, Hendrick renumbered Kasey Kahne's No. 5 to No. 24, with rookie William Byron replacing Kahne as the team's driver.

=== William Byron (2018–present) ===
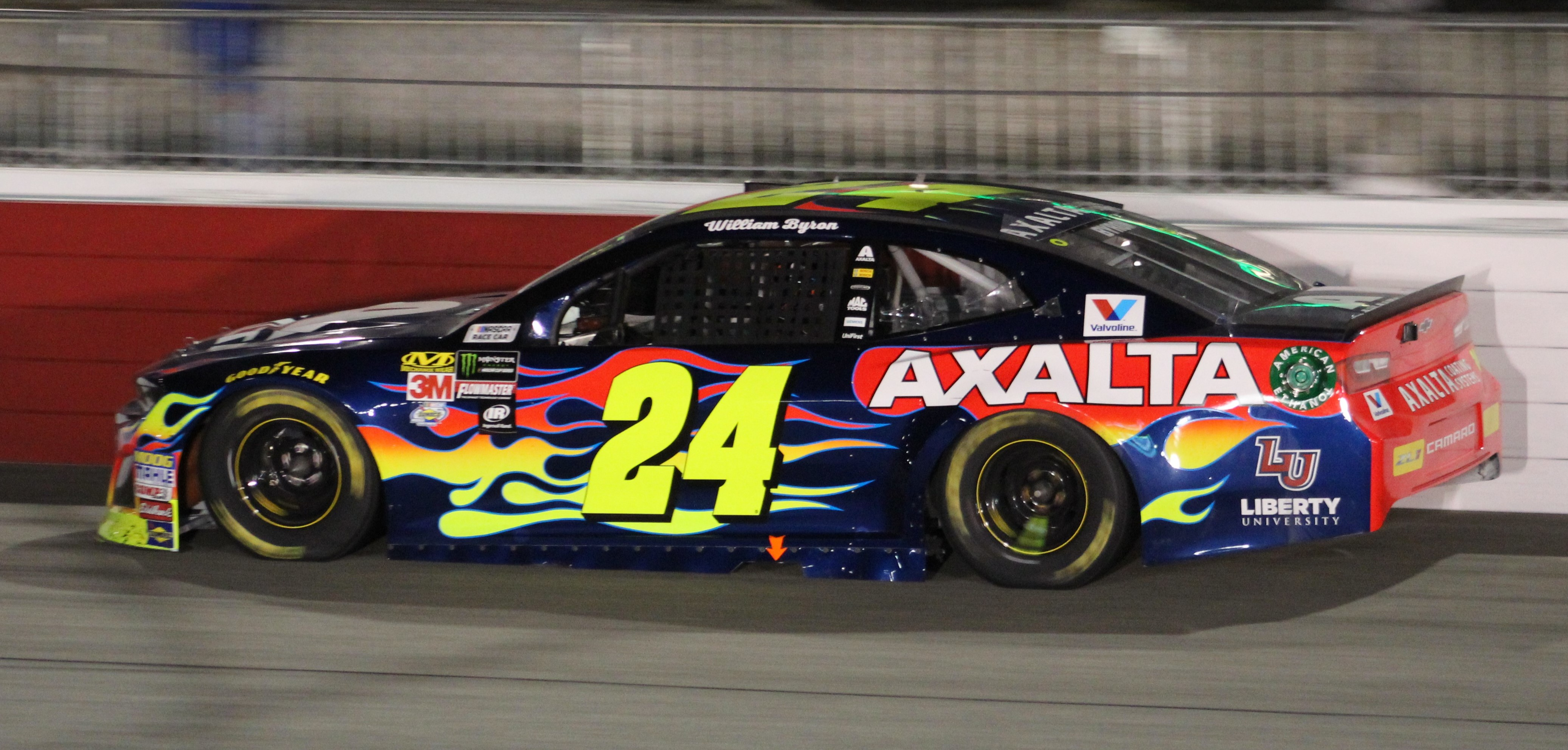
William Byron's No. 24 Chevrolet Camaro at Richmond in 2018

Byron and crew chief Darian Grubb struggled through the 2018 season, finishing in the top 10 only four times and ending the season 23rd in the standings. After just one season, Hendrick Motorsports replaced Grubb with Chad Knaus, who was crew chief for seven Cup Series championships for Hendrick's No. 48 team.

The pairing of Byron and Knaus immediately led to improved results, as Byron won the pole for the 2019 Daytona 500. The team won four more poles over the course of the 2019 season, making the Playoffs and finishing 11th. Despite not winning a race in 2019, on August 29, 2020, Byron won at Daytona, making it 94 wins overall.

Before the start of the 2021 season then Kyle Busch Motorsports crew chief Rudy Fugle would replace Knaus as the No. 24 with Knaus leaving his crew chief role to become to become the Vice President of Competition for Hendrick Motorsports. Fugle had previously been the crew chief for Byron when he competed in the Truck series for Kyle Busch Motorsports in 2016 during which he won 7 races and finished 5th in the championship before moving to Xfinity the following season.

The 2021 season opened with two finishes outside of the top 20, but in the third race of the year at Homestead-Miami, he took his second career win (the 95th for the 24) after dominating the second half of the race. Since winning at Homestead-Miami, Byron finished in the Top 10 in twelve of the next fourteen races. During the playoffs, Byron made it to the Round of 12, but struggled with poor finishes at Las Vegas and Talladega. Following the Charlotte Roval race, he was eliminated from the Round of 8. Byron finished 10th in the points standings.

During the 2022 season, Byron started with two DNFs at the 2022 Daytona 500 and Fontana, but rebounded with wins at Atlanta and Martinsville. On July 28, three days prior to the Indianapolis road race, the generator of the No. 24's hauler caught fire. The car was not damaged by the blaze. At the Texas playoff race, Byron spun Denny Hamlin towards the infield grass during a late-caution period; he was subsequently fined US$50,000 and the No. 24 was docked 25 driver and owner points. On October 6, the National Motorsports Appeals Panel rescinded the points penalty and instead amended the fine to US$100,000, placing Byron back to seventh in the playoff standings. Byron was eliminated following the Round of 8 after finishing eighth at Martinsville (Byron would be credited a 7th-place finish after 4th-place finisher Brad Keselowski was disqualified when his car failed to meet minimum-weight requirements).

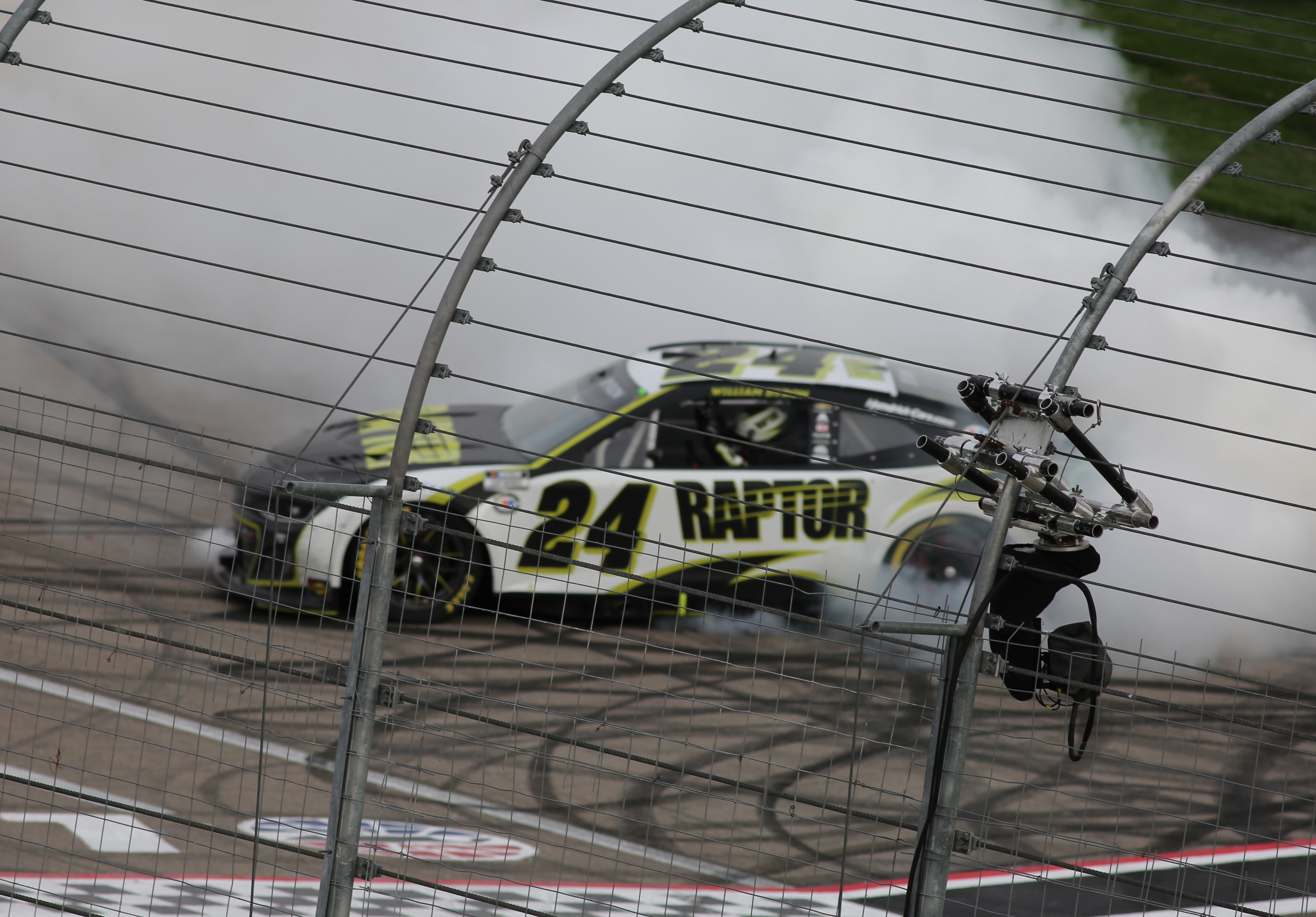
William Byron doing a burnout in his No. 24 Chevrolet Camaro at Las Vegas in 2023

Byron started the 2023 season with a 34th place DNF at the 2023 Daytona 500. He later scored back-to-back wins at Las Vegas and Phoenix. On March 15, the No. 24 was served an L2 penalty after unapproved hood louvers were found installed on the car during pre-race inspection at Phoenix; as a result, the team was docked 100 driver and owner points and 10 playoff points. In addition, Fugle was suspended for four races and fined US$100,000. On March 29, the National Motorsports Appeals Panel amended the penalty, upholding the fine and Fugle's suspension but restoring the owner, driver, and playoff points. On April 6, the No. 24 was served an L1 penalty after alterations to the car's greenhouse were discovered during post-race inspection following the Richmond race; as a result, the team was docked 60 driver and owner points and five playoff points. In addition, interim crew chief Brian Campe was suspended for two races and fined US$75,000. At Darlington, Byron scored his seventh career win and the overall 100th win for the No. 24. He scored his fourth win of the season at Atlanta after the race was shortened by rain. Byron claimed his fifth victory at Watkins Glen. Byron's sixth win of the season came in the Round of 12 opener at Texas. The win also marked Hendrick Motorsports' 300th victory in the Cup Series. Following the season finale at Phoenix, Byron finished the 2023 season third in the points standings.

Byron started the 2024 season by winning the 2024 Daytona 500. A month later, he scored his second win of the season at the Circuit of the Americas. On April 7, Byron won his third race of the season, as he and his teammates Kyle Larson and Chase Elliott took the top three spots at Martinsville on Hendrick Motorsports' 40th anniversary. Despite not winning a race during the playoffs, Byron made the Championship 4 following Martinsville after Christopher Bell was penalized for using the "Hail Melon" maneuver, which was banned by NASCAR after 2022.

Byron started the 2025 season with his second consecutive Daytona 500 win. After staying consistent, he picked up his second win of the season at Iowa. During the playoffs, Byron won at Martinsville to make the Championship 4. After a blown tire caused Byron to hit the wall late in the race, he would finished fourth in the championship.

Byron started the 2026 season with a 12th place finish at the 2026 Daytona 500. After making "The Chase" without a win in the regular season, Byron won at fall Martinsville race.

== Car No. 24 results ==
Year	Driver	No.	Make	1	2	3	4	5	6	7	8	9	10	11	12	13	14	15	16	17	18	19	20	21	22	23	24	25	26	27	28	29	30	31	32	33	34	35	36	Owners	Pts
1992	Jeff Gordon	24	Chevy	DAY	CAR	RCH	ATL	DAR	BRI	NWS	MAR	TAL	CLT	DOV	SON	POC	MCH	DAY	POC	TAL	GLN	MCH	BRI	DAR	RCH	DOV	MAR	NWS	CLT	CAR	PHO	ATL; 31								79th	70
1993	Jeff Gordon	24	Chevy	DAY; 5	CAR; 34	RCH; 6	ATL; 4	DAR; 24	BRI; 17	NWS; 34	MAR; 8	TAL; 11	SON; 11	CLT; 2	DOV; 18	POC; 28	MCH; 2	DAY; 5	NHA; 7	POC; 37	TAL; 31	GLN; 31	MCH; 3	BRI; 20	DAR; 22	RCH; 10	DOV; 24	MAR; 11	NWS; 34	CLT; 5	CAR; 21	PHO; 35	ATL; 31							15th	3447
1994	Jeff Gordon	24	Chevy	DAY; 4	CAR; 32	RCH; 3	ATL; 8	DAR; 31	BRI; 22	NWS; 15	MAR; 33	TAL; 24	SON; 37	CLT; 1	DOV; 5	POC; 6	MCH; 12	DAY; 8	NHA; 39	POC; 8	TAL; 31	IND; 1*	GLN; 9	MCH; 15	BRI; 32	DAR; 6	RCH; 2	DOV; 11	MAR; 11	NWS; 8	CLT; 28	CAR; 29	PHO; 4	ATL; 15						9th	3776
1995	Jeff Gordon	24	Chevy	DAY; 22	CAR; 1*	RCH; 36	ATL; 1*	DAR; 32*	BRI; 1*	NWS; 2	MAR; 3	TAL; 2	SON; 3	CLT; 33	DOV; 6	POC; 16*	MCH; 2*	DAY; 1*	NHA; 1*	POC; 2	TAL; 8*	IND; 6	GLN; 3	MCH; 3*	BRI; 6	DAR; 1	RCH; 6	DOV; 1*	MAR; 7	NWS; 3	CLT; 30	CAR; 20	PHO; 5	ATL; 32						1st	4614
1996	Jeff Gordon	24	Chevy	DAY; 42	CAR; 40	RCH; 1	ATL; 3	DAR; 1*	BRI; 1*	NWS; 2	MAR; 3*	TAL; 33	SON; 6	CLT; 4	DOV; 1*	POC; 1*	MCH; 6	DAY; 3	NHA; 34*	POC; 7	TAL; 1	IND; 37	GLN; 4	MCH; 5	BRI; 2	DAR; 1	RCH; 2*	DOV; 1*	MAR; 1	NWS; 1*	CLT; 31	CAR; 12	PHO; 5	ATL; 3						2nd	4620
1997	Jeff Gordon	24	Chevy	DAY; 1	CAR; 1	RCH; 4	ATL; 42	DAR; 3	TEX; 30	BRI; 1	MAR; 1*	SON; 2	TAL; 5	CLT; 1	DOV; 26	POC; 1	MCH; 5	CAL; 1*	DAY; 21	NHA; 23	POC; 2	IND; 4	GLN; 1*	MCH; 2	BRI; 35	DAR; 1	RCH; 3	NHA; 1*	DOV; 7	MAR; 4	CLT; 5	TAL; 35	CAR; 4	PHO; 17	ATL; 17					1st	4710
1998	Jeff Gordon	24	Chevy	DAY; 16	CAR; 1	LVS; 17	ATL; 19	DAR; 2	BRI; 1	TEX; 31	MAR; 8	TAL; 5	CAL; 4	CLT; 1	DOV; 3*	RCH; 37	MCH; 3*	POC; 2	SON; 1*	NHA; 3	POC; 1*	IND; 1*	GLN; 1*	MCH; 1	BRI; 5	NHA; 1	DAR; 1	RCH; 2	DOV; 2	MAR; 2	CLT; 5	TAL; 2	DAY; 1*	PHO; 7	CAR; 1	ATL; 1*				1st	5328
1999	Jeff Gordon	24	Chevy	DAY; 1	CAR; 39	LVS; 3	ATL; 1*	DAR; 3	TEX; 43	BRI; 6	MAR; 3	TAL; 38	CAL; 1*	RCH; 31	CLT; 39	DOV; 2	MCH; 2	POC; 2	SON; 1*	DAY; 21	NHA; 3	POC; 32	IND; 3	GLN; 1*	MCH; 2*	BRI; 4	DAR; 13	RCH; 40	NHA; 5	DOV; 17	MAR; 1	CLT; 1	TAL; 12*	CAR; 11	PHO; 10	HOM; 10	ATL; 38			6th	4620
2000	Jeff Gordon	24	Chevy	DAY; 34	CAR; 10	LVS; 28	ATL; 9	DAR; 8	BRI; 8*	TEX; 25	MAR; 4	TAL; 1	CAL; 11	RCH; 14	CLT; 10	DOV; 32	MCH; 14	POC; 8	SON; 1*	DAY; 10	NHA; 5	POC; 3	IND; 33	GLN; 23	MCH; 36	BRI; 23	DAR; 4	RCH; 1	NHA; 6	DOV; 9	MAR; 5	CLT; 39	TAL; 4	CAR; 2	PHO; 7	HOM; 7	ATL; 4			9th	4361
2001	Jeff Gordon	24	Chevy	DAY; 30	CAR; 3*	LVS; 1	ATL; 2*	DAR; 40	BRI; 4	TEX; 5	MAR; 12	TAL; 27	CAL; 2	RCH; 2	CLT; 29	DOV; 1*	MCH; 1*	POC; 2*	SON; 3*	DAY; 37	CHI; 17	NHA; 2*	POC; 8*	IND; 1	GLN; 1	MCH; 7	BRI; 3*	DAR; 2*	RCH; 36	DOV; 4	KAN; 1	CLT; 16	MAR; 9	TAL; 7	PHO; 6	CAR; 25	HOM; 28	ATL; 6	NHA; 15*	1st	5112
2002	Jeff Gordon	24	Chevy	DAY; 9	CAR; 7	LVS; 17	ATL; 16	DAR; 9*	BRI; 31	TEX; 2	MAR; 23	TAL; 4	CAL; 16	RCH; 7	CLT; 5	DOV; 6	POC; 5	MCH; 5	SON; 37*	DAY; 22	CHI; 2	NHA; 29	POC; 12	IND; 6	GLN; 22	MCH; 19	BRI; 1*	DAR; 1*	RCH; 40	NHA; 14	DOV; 37	KAN; 1*	TAL; 42	CLT; 4	MAR; 36	ATL; 6	CAR; 5	PHO; 3	HOM; 5	4th	4607
2003	Jeff Gordon	24	Chevy	DAY; 12	CAR; 15	LVS; 37	ATL; 2	DAR; 33	BRI; 9*	TEX; 3	TAL; 8	MAR; 1	CAL; 11	RCH; 16	CLT; 8	DOV; 2	POC; 13	MCH; 3	SON; 2	DAY; 14	CHI; 4	NHA; 24*	POC; 36	IND; 4	GLN; 33	MCH; 30	BRI; 28*	DAR; 32	RCH; 10*	NHA; 19	DOV; 5	TAL; 5*	KAN; 5	CLT; 5	MAR; 1*	ATL; 1	PHO; 7	CAR; 22	HOM; 5	4th	4785
2004	Jeff Gordon	24	Chevy	DAY; 8	CAR; 10	LVS; 15	ATL; 10	DAR; 41	BRI; 9	TEX; 3	MAR; 6*	TAL; 1	CAL; 1*	RCH; 6	CLT; 30	DOV; 36	POC; 4	MCH; 38*	SON; 1*	DAY; 1*	CHI; 4	NHA; 2	POC; 5	IND; 1*	GLN; 21	MCH; 7	BRI; 14	CAL; 37	RCH; 3	NHA; 7	DOV; 3	TAL; 19	KAN; 13	CLT; 2	MAR; 9	ATL; 34	PHO; 3	DAR; 3*	HOM; 3	3rd	6490
2005	Jeff Gordon	24	Chevy	DAY; 1	CAL; 30	LVS; 4	ATL; 39	BRI; 15	MAR; 1	TEX; 15	PHO; 12	TAL; 1*	DAR; 2	RCH; 39	CLT; 30	DOV; 39	POC; 9	MCH; 32	SON; 33	DAY; 7	CHI; 33	NHA; 25	POC; 13	IND; 8	GLN; 14	MCH; 15	BRI; 6	CAL; 21	RCH; 30	NHA; 14	DOV; 37	TAL; 37	KAN; 10	CLT; 38	MAR; 1	ATL; 2	TEX; 14	PHO; 3	HOM; 9	11th	4174
2006	Jeff Gordon	24	Chevy	DAY; 26	CAL; 13	LVS; 5	ATL; 4	BRI; 21	MAR; 2	TEX; 22	PHO; 10	TAL; 15*	RCH; 40	DAR; 2	CLT; 36	DOV; 12	POC; 34	MCH; 8*	SON; 1*	DAY; 40	CHI; 1	NHA; 15	POC; 3	IND; 16	GLN; 13	MCH; 2	BRI; 5	CAL; 5	RCH; 31	NHA; 3	DOV; 3	KAN; 39	TAL; 36	CLT; 24	MAR; 5	ATL; 6	TEX; 9	PHO; 4	HOM; 24	6th	6256
2007	Jeff Gordon	24	Chevy	DAY; 10	CAL; 2	LVS; 2*	ATL; 12	BRI; 3	MAR; 2	TEX; 4*	PHO; 1	TAL; 1*	RCH; 4*	DAR; 1	CLT; 41	DOV; 9	POC; 1	MCH; 9	SON; 7	NHA; 2	DAY; 5	CHI; 9	IND; 3	POC; 4	GLN; 9*	MCH; 27	BRI; 19	CAL; 22	RCH; 4*	NHA; 2	DOV; 11	KAN; 5	TAL; 1	CLT; 1	MAR; 3*	ATL; 7	TEX; 7	PHO; 10	HOM; 4	2nd	6646
2008	Jeff Gordon	24	Chevy	DAY; 39	CAL; 3	LVS; 35	ATL; 5	BRI; 11	MAR; 2	TEX; 43	PHO; 13	TAL; 19	RCH; 9	DAR; 3	CLT; 4	DOV; 5	POC; 14	MCH; 18	SON; 3	NHA; 11	DAY; 30	CHI; 11	IND; 5	POC; 10	GLN; 29	MCH; 42	BRI; 5	CAL; 15	RCH; 8	NHA; 14	DOV; 7	KAN; 4	TAL; 38	CLT; 8	MAR; 4	ATL; 9	TEX; 2	PHO; 41	HOM; 4	7th	6316
2009	Jeff Gordon	24	Chevy	DAY; 13	CAL; 2	LVS; 6	ATL; 2	BRI; 4	MAR; 4	TEX; 1*	PHO; 25	TAL; 37	RCH; 8	DAR; 5	CLT; 14	DOV; 26	POC; 4	MCH; 2	SON; 9	NHA; 2	DAY; 28	CHI; 2	IND; 9	POC; 8	GLN; 37	MCH; 2	BRI; 23	ATL; 8	RCH; 3	NHA; 15	DOV; 6	KAN; 2	CAL; 2	CLT; 4	MAR; 5	TAL; 20	TEX; 13	PHO; 9	HOM; 6	3rd	6473
2010	Jeff Gordon	24	Chevy	DAY; 26	CAL; 20	LVS; 3*	ATL; 18	BRI; 14	MAR; 3	PHO; 2	TEX; 31	TAL; 22	RCH; 2	DAR; 4*	DOV; 11	CLT; 6	POC; 32	MCH; 4	SON; 5	NHA; 4	DAY; 3	CHI; 3	IND; 23	POC; 6	GLN; 10	MCH; 27	BRI; 11	ATL; 13	RCH; 12	NHA; 6	DOV; 11	KAN; 5	CAL; 9	CLT; 23	MAR; 20	TAL; 8	TEX; 37	PHO; 11	HOM; 37	9th	6176
2011	Jeff Gordon	24	Chevy	DAY; 28	PHO; 1*	LVS; 36	BRI; 14	CAL; 18	MAR; 5	TEX; 23	TAL; 3	RCH; 39	DAR; 12	DOV; 17	CLT; 20	KAN; 4	POC; 1	MCH; 17	SON; 2	DAY; 6	KEN; 10	NHA; 11	IND; 2	POC; 6	GLN; 13	MCH; 6	BRI; 3*	ATL; 1*	RCH; 3	CHI; 24	NHA; 4*	DOV; 12	KAN; 34	CLT; 21	TAL; 27	MAR; 3	TEX; 6	PHO; 32	HOM; 5	8th	2287
2012	Jeff Gordon	24	Chevy	DAY; 40	PHO; 8	LVS; 12	BRI; 35	CAL; 26	MAR; 14*	TEX; 4	KAN; 21	RCH; 23	TAL; 33	DAR; 35	CLT; 7	DOV; 13	POC; 19	MCH; 6	SON; 6	KEN; 5	DAY; 12	NHA; 6	IND; 5	POC; 1	GLN; 21	MCH; 28	BRI; 3	ATL; 2	RCH; 2	CHI; 35	NHA; 3	DOV; 2	TAL; 2	CLT; 18	KAN; 10	MAR; 7	TEX; 14	PHO; 30	HOM; 1	10th	2303
2013	Jeff Gordon	24	Chevy	DAY; 20	PHO; 9	LVS; 25	BRI; 34	CAL; 11	MAR; 3	TEX; 38	KAN; 13	RCH; 11	TAL; 11	DAR; 3	CLT; 35	DOV; 3	POC; 12	MCH; 39	SON; 2	KEN; 8	DAY; 34	NHA; 10	IND; 7	POC; 2	GLN; 36	MCH; 17	BRI; 7	ATL; 6	RCH; 8	CHI; 6	NHA; 15	DOV; 4	KAN; 3	CLT; 7	TAL; 14	MAR; 1	TEX; 38	PHO; 14	HOM; 11	6th	2337
2014	Jeff Gordon	24	Chevy	DAY; 4	PHO; 5	LVS; 9	BRI; 7	CAL; 13	MAR; 12	TEX; 2	DAR; 7	RCH; 2*	TAL; 39	KAN; 1	CLT; 7	DOV; 15	POC; 8	MCH; 6	SON; 2	KEN; 6	DAY; 12	NHA; 26	IND; 1	POC; 6*	GLN; 34*	MCH; 1	BRI; 16	ATL; 17	RCH; 2	CHI; 2	NHA; 26	DOV; 1	KAN; 14	CLT; 2	TAL; 26	MAR; 2*	TEX; 29	PHO; 2	HOM; 10*	6th	2348
2015	Jeff Gordon	24	Chevy	DAY; 33*	ATL; 41	LVS; 18	PHO; 9	CAL; 10	MAR; 9	TEX; 7	BRI; 3	RCH; 8	TAL; 31	KAN; 4	CLT; 15	DOV; 10	POC; 14	MCH; 21	SON; 16	DAY; 6	KEN; 7	NHA; 9	IND; 42	POC; 3	GLN; 41	MCH; 17	BRI; 20	DAR; 16	RCH; 7	CHI; 14	NHA; 7	DOV; 12	CLT; 8	KAN; 10	TAL; 3	MAR; 1	TEX; 9	PHO; 6	HOM; 6	3rd	5038
2016	Chase Elliott	24	Chevy	DAY; 37	ATL; 8	LVS; 38	PHO; 8	CAL; 6	MAR; 20	TEX; 5	BRI; 4	RCH; 12	TAL; 5	KAN; 9	DOV; 3	CLT; 8	POC; 4*	MCH; 2	SON; 21	DAY; 32	KEN; 31	NHA; 34	IND; 15	POC; 33	GLN; 13	BRI; 15	MCH; 2	DAR; 10	RCH; 19	CHI; 3	NHA; 13	DOV; 3	CLT; 33	KAN; 31	TAL; 12	MAR; 12	TEX; 4	PHO; 9	HOM; 11	10th	2285
2017	Chase Elliott	24	Chevy	DAY; 14	ATL; 5	LVS; 3	PHO; 12	CAL; 10	MAR; 3	TEX; 9	BRI; 7	RCH; 24	TAL; 30	KAN; 29	CLT; 38	DOV; 5	POC; 8	MCH; 2	SON; 8	DAY; 22	KEN; 3	NHA; 11	IND; 39	POC; 10	GLN; 13	MCH; 8	BRI; 18	DAR; 11	RCH; 10	CHI; 2	NHA; 11	DOV; 2*	CLT; 2	TAL; 16	KAN; 4	MAR; 27	TEX; 8	PHO; 2	HOM; 5	5th	2377
2018	William Byron	24	Chevy	DAY; 23	ATL; 18	LVS; 27	PHO; 12	CAL; 15	MAR; 20	TEX; 10	BRI; 18	RCH; 12	TAL; 29	DOV; 14	KAN; 33	CLT; 39	POC; 18	MCH; 13	SON; 25	CHI; 20	DAY; 32	KEN; 20	NHA; 14	POC; 6	GLN; 8	MCH; 36	BRI; 23	DAR; 35	IND; 19	LVS; 37	RCH; 20	ROV; 34	DOV; 19	TAL; 20	KAN; 38	MAR; 39	TEX; 16	PHO; 9	HOM; 24	23rd	587
2019	William Byron	24	Chevy	DAY; 21	ATL; 17	LVS; 16	PHO; 24	CAL; 15	MAR; 22	TEX; 6	BRI; 16	RCH; 13	TAL; 21	DOV; 8	KAN; 20	CLT; 9	POC; 9	MCH; 18	SON; 19	CHI; 8	DAY; 2	KEN; 18	NHA; 12	POC; 4	GLN; 21	MCH; 8	BRI; 21	DAR; 21	IND; 4	LVS; 7	RCH; 24	ROV; 6	DOV; 13	TAL; 33	KAN; 5	MAR; 2	TEX; 17	PHO; 17	HOM; 39	11th	2274
2020	William Byron	24	Chevy	DAY; 40	LVS; 22	CAL; 15	PHO; 10	DAR; 35	DAR; 12	CLT; 20	CLT; 12	BRI; 8	ATL; 33	MAR; 8	HOM; 9	TAL; 11	POC; 14	POC; 7	IND; 27	KEN; 11	TEX; 37	KAN; 10	NHA; 11	MCH; 14	MCH; 12	DRC; 8	DOV; 28	DOV; 4	DAY; 1	DAR; 5	RCH; 21	BRI; 38	LVS; 25	TAL; 4	ROV; 6*	KAN; 8	TEX; 13	MAR; 35	PHO; 9	14th	2247
2021	William Byron	24	Chevy	DAY; 26	DRC; 33	HOM; 1*	LVS; 8	PHO; 8	ATL; 8	BRD; 6	MAR; 4	RCH; 7	TAL; 2	KAN; 9	DAR; 4	DOV; 4	COA; 11	CLT; 4	SON; 35	NSS; 3	POC; 3	POC; 12	ROA; 33	ATL; 20	NHA; 21	GLN; 6	IRC; 33	MCH; 2	DAY; 37	DAR; 34	RCH; 19	BRI; 3	LVS; 18	TAL; 36	ROV; 11*	TEX; 2	KAN; 6	MAR; 5	PHO; 17	10th	2306
2022	William Byron	24	Chevy	DAY; 38	CAL; 34	LVS; 5	PHO; 18	ATL; 1*	COA; 12	RCH; 3	MAR; 1*	BRD; 18	TAL; 15	DOV; 22	DAR; 13	KAN; 16	CLT; 32	GTW; 19	SON; 9	NSS; 35	ROA; 16	ATL; 30	NHA; 11	POC; 12	IRC; 31	MCH; 12	RCH; 11	GLN; 22	DAY; 34	DAR; 8	KAN; 6	BRI; 3	TEX; 7	TAL; 12	ROV; 16	LVS; 13	HOM; 13	MAR; 7	PHO; 6	6th	2378
2023	William Byron	24	Chevy	DAY; 34	CAL; 25	LVS; 1*	PHO; 1	ATL; 32	COA; 5	RCH; 24*	BRD; 13	MAR; 23	TAL; 7	DOV; 4*	KAN; 3	DAR; 1	CLT; 2	GTW; 8	SON; 14	NSS; 6	CSC; 13	ATL; 1	NHA; 24	POC; 14*	RCH; 21	MCH; 35	IRC; 14	GLN; 1*	DAY; 8	DAR; 4	KAN; 15	BRI; 9	TEX; 1	TAL; 2	ROV; 2	LVS; 6	HOM; 4	MAR; 13	PHO; 4	3rd	5033
2024	William Byron	24	Chevy	DAY; 1	ATL; 17	LVS; 10	PHO; 18	BRI; 35	COA; 1*	RCH; 7	MAR; 1*	TEX; 3	TAL; 7	DOV; 33	KAN; 23	DAR; 6	CLT; 3	GTW; 15	SON; 30	IOW; 2	NHA; 26	NSS; 19	CSC; 8	POC; 4	IND; 38	RCH; 13	MCH; 2	DAY; 27	DAR; 30	ATL; 9	GLN; 34	BRI; 17	KAN; 2	TAL; 3	ROV; 3	LVS; 4	HOM; 6	MAR; 6	PHO; 3	3rd	5034
2025	William Byron	24	Chevy	DAY; 1	ATL; 27	COA; 2	PHO; 6	LVS; 4	HOM; 12	MAR; 22	DAR; 2*	BRI; 6	TAL; 3	TEX; 13	KAN; 24	CLT; 2*	NSS; 5	MCH; 28*	MXC; 9	POC; 27	ATL; 37	CSC; 40	SON; 8	DOV; 32	IND; 16	IOW; 1*	GLN; 4	RCH; 12	DAY; 19	DAR; 21	GTW; 11	BRI; 12	NHA; 3	KAN; 9	ROV; 11	LVS; 36	TAL; 25	MAR; 1*	PHO; 33	4th	5004
2026	William Byron	24	Chevy	DAY; 12	ATL; 28	COA; 13	PHO; 7	LVS; 3	DAR; 8	MAR; 5	BRI; 30	KAN; 7	TAL; 35	TEX; 8	GLN; 36	CLT; 9	NSS; 30	MCH; 18	POC; 3	COR; 32	SON; 12	CHI; 4*	ATL; 16	NWS; 12	IND; 21	IOW; 9	RCH; 9	NHA; 30	DAY; 22	DAR; 37	GTW; 4	BRI; 9	KAN; 7	LVS; 6	CLT; 39	PHO; 21	TAL; 2	MAR; 1*	HOM; 2	8th	2344
