= Lakeville, New York =

- Census-designated place
- Location within New York Location within the United States
- Coordinates: 42°50′11″N 77°42′18″W
- Country: United States
- State: New York
- County: Livingston
- Town: Livonia

Area
  - Total: 0.67 sq mi (1.73 km^{2})
  - Land: 0.67 sq mi (1.73 km^{2})
  - Water: 0 sq mi (0.00 km^{2})
- Elevation: 825 ft (251 m)

Population (2020)
  - Total: 694
  - Density: 1,039.9/sq mi (401.51/km^{2})
- Time zone: UTC-5 (Eastern (EST))
  - Summer (DST): UTC-4 (EDT)
- ZIP Code: 14480
- Area code: 585
- GNIS feature ID: 954991
- FIPS code: 36-41036

Lakeville is a hamlet and census-designated place (CDP) in the town of Livonia, Livingston County, New York, United States. As of the 2020 census, Lakeville had a population of 694.

== Geography ==
Lakeville is in northeastern Livingston County, in the northwestern part of the town of Livonia. It sits at the northern end of Conesus Lake, the westernmost of New York's Finger Lakes, where the lake flows out into Conesus Creek, a northward-flowing tributary of the Genesee River. Lakeville is bordered to the south by the Conesus Lake CDP.

U.S. Route 20A passes through the center of Lakeville, leading east 2 miles (3 km) to Livonia village and west 6 miles (10 km) to Geneseo, the Livingston county seat. New York State Route 15 also passes through the community, leading east to Livonia village with US 20A but turning north up Rochester Road to lead 2 miles (3 km) to Interstate 390 and 23 miles (37 km) to Rochester.

According to the U.S. Census Bureau, the Lakeville CDP has an area of 0.66 square miles (1.7 km^{2}), all land.

== Demographics ==
Historical population
Census	Pop.	Note	%±
2020	694		—
U.S. Decennial Census
