= South Lima, New York =

- Census-designated place
- Location within New York Location within the United States
- Coordinates: 42°51′19″N 77°40′31″W
- Country: United States
- State: New York
- County: Livingston
- Towns: Lima, Avon, Livonia

Area
  - Total: 0.88 sq mi (2.29 km^{2})
  - Land: 0.88 sq mi (2.29 km^{2})
  - Water: 0 sq mi (0.00 km^{2})
- Elevation: 905 ft (276 m)

Population (2020)
  - Total: 269
  - Density: 304.3/sq mi (117.48/km^{2})
- Time zone: UTC-5 (Eastern (EST))
  - Summer (DST): UTC-4 (EDT)
- ZIP Codes: 14558 (South Lima); 14487 (Livonia); 14414 (Avon)
- Area code: 585
- GNIS feature ID: 965807
- FIPS code: 36-69364

South Lima is a hamlet and census-designated place (CDP) in Livingston County, New York, United States. As of the 2020 census, South Lima had a population of 269. South Lima had a post office from January 10, 1854, until April 17, 2010; it still has its own ZIP code, 14558.

== Geography ==
South Lima is in northeastern Livingston County, along the boundaries between the towns of Lima, Livonia, and Avon. South Lima Road, the main street through the community, forms the Lima/Livonia town line, and Garden Street, which enters from the north, forms the Lima/Avon line. The South Lima CDP extends west to Bronson Hill Road and east to Poplar Hill Road. The community is 6 miles (10 km) southwest of the village of Lima, 7 miles (11 km) southeast of the village of Avon, and 3 miles (5 km) north of the village of Livonia. It is 23 miles (37 km) south of the city of Rochester.

According to the U.S. Census Bureau, the South Lima CDP has an area of 0.883 square miles (2.29 km^{2}), all land. It is in the valley of Little Conesus Creek, which flows north and west to Conesus Creek and is part of the Genesee River watershed.

== Demographics ==
Historical population
Census	Pop.	Note	%±
2020	269		—
U.S. Decennial Census
