= Conesus Lake, New York =

- Census-designated place
- Location within New York Location within the United States
- Coordinates: 42°46′32″N 77°42′49″W
- Country: United States
- State: New York
- County: Livingston
- Towns: Conesus, Geneseo, Groveland, Livonia

Area
  - Total: 9.41 sq mi (24.38 km^{2})
  - Land: 4.36 sq mi (11.30 km^{2})
  - Water: 5.05 sq mi (13.08 km^{2})
- Elevation: 817 ft (249 m)

Population (2020)
  - Total: 2,270
  - Density: 520.5/sq mi (200.95/km^{2})
- Time zone: UTC-5 (Eastern (EST))
  - Summer (DST): UTC-4 (EDT)
- ZIP Codes: 14480 (Lakeville); 14487 (Livonia); 14454 (Geneseo); 14435 (Conesus)
- Area code: 585
- GNIS feature ID: 2584248
- FIPS code: 36-17622

Conesus Lake is a hamlet and census-designated place (CDP) in Livingston County, New York, United States. As of the 2020 census, Conesus Lake had a population of 2,270. The community is located in the towns of Geneseo, Livonia, Groveland, and Conesus and covers Conesus Lake, the westernmost of New York's Finger Lakes, and nearly all of the lake's shoreline communities.

== Geography ==
According to the U.S. Census Bureau, the community has an area of 9.4 square miles (24 km^{2}); 4.4 square miles (11 km^{2}) of its area is land, and 5.1 square miles (13 km^{2}) are water. It is bordered to the north by the hamlet of Lakeville at the lake's outlet in the town of Livonia.

New York State Route 256 (West Lake Road) follows the western shore of the lake, and East Lake Road runs along the eastern side. The lake is 7.6 miles (12.2 km) long from north to south, with an east-west width of about 0.6 miles (1.0 km), while the CDP measures slightly over 8 miles (13 km) from north to south and about 1 mile (1.6 km) from east to west.

Geneseo, the Livingston county seat, is 5 miles (8 km) west of the center of the CDP.

== Demographics ==
Historical population
| Census | Pop. | Note | %± |
|---|---|---|---|
| 2020 | 2,270 | | — |
U.S. Decennial Census

=== 2020 census ===
As of the 2020 census, Conesus Lake had a population of 2,270. The median age was 54.6 years. 13.2% of residents were under the age of 18 and 27.3% of residents were 65 years of age or older. For every 100 females there were 95.5 males, and for every 100 females age 18 and over there were 97.5 males age 18 and over.

83.1% of residents lived in urban areas, while 16.9% lived in rural areas.

There were 1,199 households in Conesus Lake, of which 18.3% had children under the age of 18 living in them. Of all households, 54.5% were married-couple households, 18.2% were households with a male householder and no spouse or partner present, and 17.9% were households with a female householder and no spouse or partner present. About 29.8% of all households were made up of individuals and 15.9% had someone living alone who was 65 years of age or older.

There were 1,958 housing units, of which 38.8% were vacant. The homeowner vacancy rate was 0.2% and the rental vacancy rate was 10.7%.

Racial composition as of the 2020 census
| Race | Number | Percent |
|---|---|---|
| White | 2,126 | 93.7% |
| Black or African American | 9 | 0.4% |
| American Indian and Alaska Native | 4 | 0.2% |
| Asian | 15 | 0.7% |
| Native Hawaiian and Other Pacific Islander | 0 | 0.0% |
| Some other race | 6 | 0.3% |
| Two or more races | 110 | 4.8% |
| Hispanic or Latino (of any race) | 45 | 2.0% |
