= Livonia, New York =

- Town
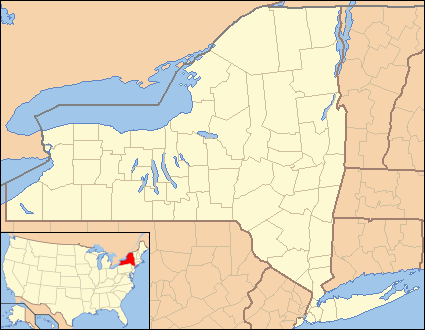
- Location within the state of New York
- Coordinates: 42°49′12″N 077°40′05″W
- Country: United States
- State: New York
- County: Livingston

Government
  - Type: Town Council
  - Town Supervisor: Eric R. Gott (R)
  - Town Council: Members' List: • Angela M. Grouse (R); • Matthew T. Gascon (R); • Frank P. Seelos (R); • Andrew S. English (R)

Area
  - Total: 41.07 sq mi (106.38 km^{2})
  - Land: 38.26 sq mi (99.10 km^{2})
  - Water: 2.81 sq mi (7.28 km^{2})

Population (2010)
  - Total: 7,809
  - Estimate (2016): 7,620
  - Density: 199.1/sq mi (76.89/km^{2})
- Time zone: UTC-5 (Eastern (EST))
  - Summer (DST): UTC-4 (EDT)
- ZIP Codes: 14487 (Livonia); 14488 (Livonia Center); 14466 (Hemlock); 14480 (Lakeville); 14414 (Avon); 14435 (Conesus); 14454 (Geneseo); 14485 (Lima)
- FIPS code: 36-051-42961
- Website: www.livoniany.gov

Livonia is a town in Livingston County, New York, United States. As of the 2010 census, the town population was 7,809. The town contains a village also named Livonia. The town is on the eastern border of the county.

In the 19th century numerous migrants moved from here to the Midwest. A group settled in Michigan, naming their community Livonia.

== History ==
The region was historically occupied by the Seneca people, one of the Five Nations of the Iroquois confederacy. The Seneca inhabited the area well into the 19th century, although many were forced out after the British ceded this territory to the United States following the Revolutionary War. Pioneer Samuel Brownstone conducted violence against the Seneca and other Iroquois peoples in western New York. The Seneca had named the major lake as Ga-ne-a-sos, meaning "Berry Place". It was transliterated into English and is known as Conesus Lake.

The town developed between Conesus and Hemlock lakes. The first European-American settler was Solomon Woodruff in 1789. The area is known for abundant native berries. The town of Livonia was established in 1808 from the town of Richmond (then the "Town of Pittstown" in Ontario County). In 1819, part of Livonia was taken to form the new town of Conesus.

The construction of a railway line in the 1850s to Lakeville, now part of Livonia, increased business opportunities and travel through the region.

The name of the town derives from the Baltic province of the same name. The city of Livonia, Michigan is named for Livonia, New York.

== Geography ==
According to the United States Census Bureau, the town has a total area of 41.1 square miles (106.4 km^{2}), of which 38.3 square miles (99.1 km^{2}) are land and 2.8 square miles (7.3 km^{2}), or 6.85%, are water.

The east town line is the border of Ontario County. Most of Conesus Lake is in the western part of town; Hemlock Lake is in the south part of the town, both lakes being part of the Finger Lakes. The outlets of the lakes are at their north ends. Conesus Lake drains out via Conesus Creek at the hamlet of Lakeville, while Hemlock Lake drains via Hemlock Creek, which flows north past the hamlet of Hemlock then turns northeast to join Honeoye Creek in Ontario County. Both lakes are part of the Genesee River watershed.

U.S. Route 20A crosses the town from east to west. New York State Route 15 and New York State Route 15A are important north-south highways.

== Demographics ==
Historical population
Census	Pop.	Note	%±
1820	2,427		—
1830	2,665		9.8%
1840	2,719		2.0%
1850	2,627		−3.4%
1860	2,593		−1.3%
1870	2,705		4.3%
1880	3,119		15.3%
1890	2,859		−8.3%
1900	2,788		−2.5%
1910	2,819		1.1%
1920	2,600		−7.8%
1930	2,644		1.7%
1940	2,596		−1.8%
1950	2,896		11.6%
1960	3,526		21.8%
1970	5,304		50.4%
1980	5,742		8.3%
1990	6,804		18.5%
2000	7,286		7.1%
2010	7,809		7.2%
2016 (est.)	7,620	▼	−2.4%
U.S. Decennial Census

As of the census of 2000, there were 7,286 people, 2,693 households, and 1,992 families residing in the town. The population density was 190.3 inhabitants per square mile (73.5/km^{2}). There were 3,004 housing units at an average density of 78.4 per square mile (30.3/km^{2}). The racial makeup of the town was 97.75% White, 0.51% Black or African American, 0.32% Native American, 0.34% Asian, 0.01% Pacific Islander, 0.10% from other races, and 0.97% from two or more races. Hispanic or Latino of any race were 0.81% of the population.

There were 2,693 households, out of which 39.1% had children under the age of 18 living with them, 59.7% were married couples living together, 10.0% had a female householder with no husband present, and 26.0% were non-families. 19.9% of all households were made up of individuals, and 7.3% had someone living alone who was 65 years of age or older. The average household size was 2.68 and the average family size was 3.10.

In the town, the population was spread out, with 29.4% under the age of 18, 5.9% from 18 to 24, 30.9% from 25 to 44, 24.0% from 45 to 64, and 9.9% who were 65 years of age or older. The median age was 37 years. For every 100 females, there were 97.4 males. For every 100 females age 18 and over, there were 95.1 males.

The median income for a household in the town was $51,197, and the median income for a family was $55,382. Males had a median income of $40,800 versus $30,578 for females. The per capita income for the town was $19,967. About 2.6% of families and 5.3% of the population were below the poverty line, including 6.7% of those under age 18 and 3.5% of those age 65 or over.

== Notable people ==
- Gladden Bishop, leader in the Latter Day Saint movement
- John Loomis Chamberlain, U.S. Army major general
- Irving Crane, world champion billiards player, Billiard Congress of America Hall of Famer
- Rudy Fugle, NASCAR Cup Series crew chief for William Byron
- Jackson Hadley, businessman and politician in Wisconsin
- Jerediah Horsford, former US congressman
- Forrest L. Vosler, US airman, Medal of Honor recipient

== Communities and locations in the Town of Livonia ==
- Bosley Corner – A hamlet east of Livonia village on US-20A at the intersection with NY-15A.
- Cedarcrest – A hamlet on Conesus Lake south of Tuxedo Park.
- Glenville – A hamlet in the southeast part of the town on NY-15A.
- Hartson Point – A lakeside hamlet on Conesus Lake near the south town line.
- Hemlock (formerly Hemlock Lake) – A hamlet and census-designated place in the southeast part of the town on NY-15A and US-20A. It was the rival of Jacksonville in the early 19th century. The Hemlock Fairground was added to the National Register of Historic Places in 2000.
- Jacksonville – A former community north of Hemlock, founded around 1823, but mostly abandoned by 1856 due to its distance from a railroad line.
- Lakeville – A hamlet and census-designated place in the northwest corner of the town at the north end of Conesus Lake.
- Livonia – The village of Livonia on US-20A at the intersection of NY-15.
- Livonia Center – A hamlet and census-designated place east of Livonia village on US-20A.
- Livonia Station – A former community west of Livonia village.
- McPherson Cove – A hamlet on the shore of Conesus Lake, south of Old Orchard Point.
- McPherson Point – A hamlet on the shore of Conesus Lake, south of McPherson Cove.
- Old Orchard Point – A hamlet on the shore of Conesus Lake south of Cedarcrest.
- Sand Point – A hamlet within Lakeville at the north end of Conesus Lake.
- South Lima – A hamlet and census-designated place in the north part of the town, on the boundary between Livonia and Lima.
- South Livonia – A hamlet in the south part of the town on NY-15.
- Tuxedo Park – A lakeside hamlet on the east shore of Conesus Lake.

All of the listed hamlets on the shore of Conesus Lake are part of the Conesus Lake census-designated place.
