= Livonia Center, New York =

- Census-designated place
- Location within New York Location within the United States
- Coordinates: 42°49′17″N 77°38′19″W
- Country: United States
- State: New York
- County: Livingston
- Town: Livonia

Area
  - Total: 0.82 sq mi (2.12 km^{2})
  - Land: 0.82 sq mi (2.12 km^{2})
  - Water: 0 sq mi (0.00 km^{2})
- Elevation: 1,086 ft (331 m)

Population (2020)
  - Total: 417
  - Density: 510.6/sq mi (197.13/km^{2})
- Time zone: UTC-5 (Eastern (EST))
  - Summer (DST): UTC-4 (EDT)
- ZIP Codes: 14488 (Livonia Center); 14487 (Livonia)
- Area code: 585
- GNIS feature ID: 955755
- FIPS code: 36-42972

Livonia Center is a hamlet and census-designated place (CDP) in the town of Livonia, Livingston County, New York, United States. As of the 2020 census, Livonia Center had a population of 417. Livonia Center has a post office with ZIP code 14488, which opened on April 9, 1811.

== Geography ==
Livonia Center is in northeastern Livingston County, slightly north of the geographic center of the town of Livonia. U.S. Route 20A passes through the community, leading west 1.5 miles (2.4 km) to the village of Livonia and southeast 3.5 miles (5.6 km) to Hemlock. It is 25 miles (40 km) south of Rochester and 10 miles (16 km) east of Geneseo, the Livingston county seat.

According to the U.S. Census Bureau, the Livonia Center CDP has an area of 0.8 square miles (2.1 km^{2}), all land. The community is drained by Kinney Creek, a southeast-flowing tributary of Hemlock Outlet and part of the Genesee River watershed.

== Demographics ==
Historical population
Census	Pop.	Note	%±
2020	417		—
U.S. Decennial Census
