= A. I. Adams =

American lawyer and politician from Washington

Member of the Washington House of Representatives from the 40th district
- In office 1891–1893

Personal details
- Born: September 21, 1865 Livonia, New York, U.S.
- Died: February 5, 1906 (aged 40) Seward, Alaska, U.S.
- Party: Republican
- Education: University of Rochester
- Occupation: Lawyer, Politician
- Other name: Albert Isaac Adams

Albert Isaac Adams (September 21, 1865 – February 5, 1906) was an American politician in the state of Washington. He served in the Washington House of Representatives from 1891 to 1893. He was born in Livonia, New York on September 21, 1865, attended the University of Rochester, and moved to Seattle in 1887. A real estate lawyer, he was the youngest member of the legislature during his term.
