= Rudy Fugle =

American crew chief

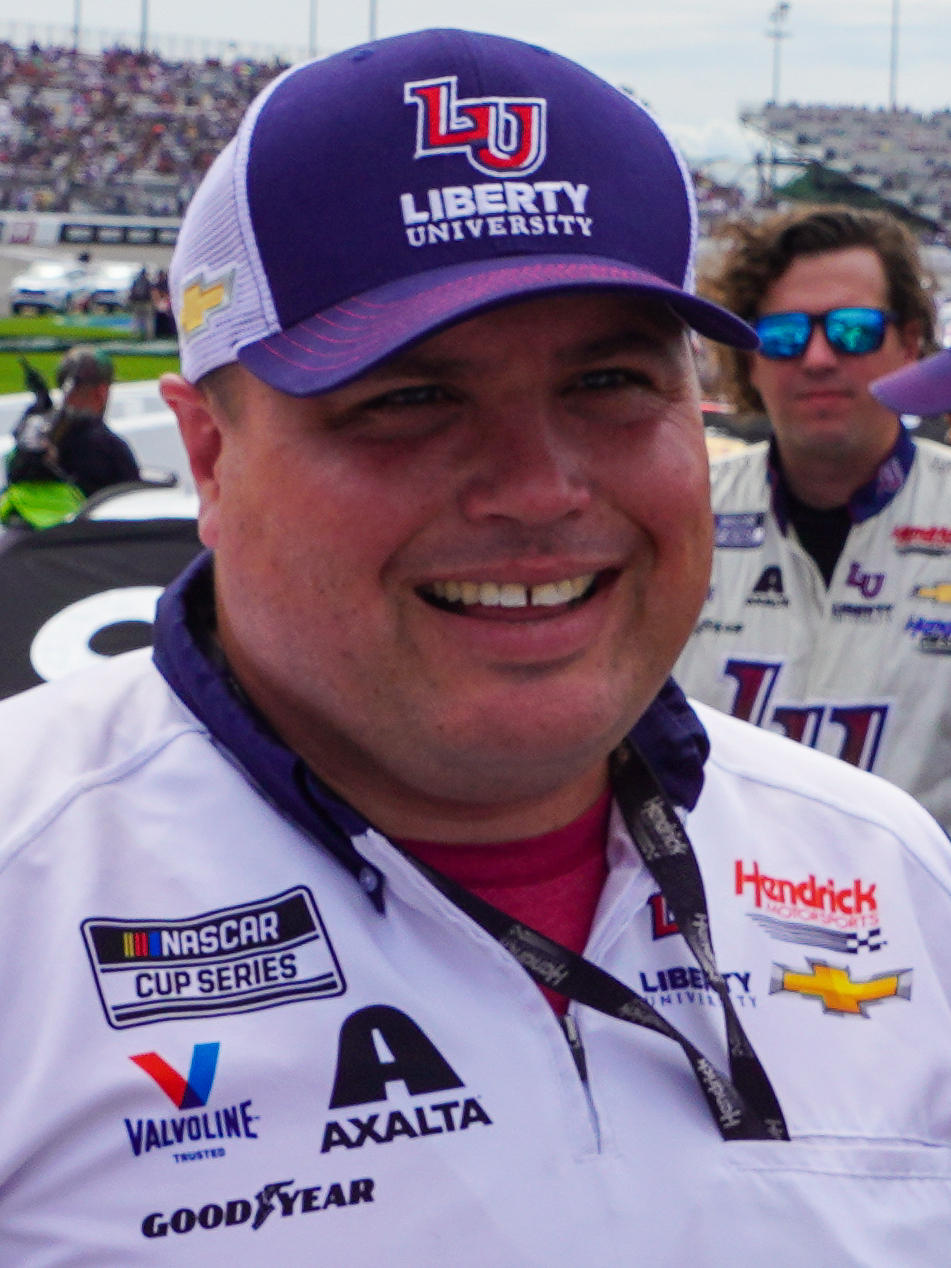
- Fugle at Richmond Raceway in 2022

Personal information
- Born: Ryan Scott Fugle; April 11, 1984 (age 42) Livonia, New York, U.S.
- Occupation: Crew chief
- Years active: 2009–present

Sport
- Sport: Auto racing
- League: NASCAR Cup Series
- Team: 48. Hendrick Motorsports

Ryan Scott "Rudy" Fugle (born April 11, 1984) is an American NASCAR crew chief who works for Hendrick Motorsports as the crew chief of their No. 48 Chevrolet Camaro ZL1 in the NASCAR Cup Series driven by Alex Bowman. He previously was the crew chief of the No. 24 car driven by William Byron. He worked for Kyle Busch Motorsports as a crew chief in the NASCAR Truck Series, where he won 28 races, two drivers' championships and five owners' championships. Prior to that, he crew chiefed for Germain Racing in the Truck Series as well as what is now the NASCAR O'Reilly Auto Parts Series.

== Racing career ==
=== 2007–2012: Early career ===
Fugle, a native of Livonia, New York, graduated from UNC Charlotte in 2007 with a degree in mechanical engineering. He got his first job in racing as an engineering intern at Robert Yates Racing. In 2009, he would join Germain Racing as an engineer before being promoted as crew chief for their No. 15 car driven by Michael Annett in what was then known as the NASCAR Nationwide Series. After seven races together in 2009, Fugle and Annett would team up for the full 2010 season. Together, the two would only get two top-ten finishes and finish 13th in the final standings.

Germain closed down their Nationwide Series team in 2011 and Fugle moved over to Germain's Truck Series team for the 2011 season, crew chiefing their No. 77 truck driven by Justin Lofton for the first 9 races of the season.

=== 2013–2020: Kyle Busch Motorsports ===
Fugle would then move to Kyle Busch Motorsports in 2013, becoming the crew chief for drivers such as Denny Hamlin, Erik Jones, and team owner Kyle Busch. Fugle would get his first win as a crew chief at Charlotte, where Kyle Busch would win. Fugle would end the season with six wins, five with Busch and one with Jones.

In 2015, Fugle would return to the Truck Series with Erik Jones full time. The pair would start the season strong, getting the pole four times in the first ten races and winning the race at Iowa. Before seasons end, the team would get two more wins and ended up winning the championship.

In 2016, Jones would move up to the Xfinity Series full-time driving Joe Gibbs Racing's No. 20 car. Fugle moved over to KBM's No. 9 truck (previously the No. 54) driven by defending East Series champion William Byron. They had an impressive season, winning a whopping seven races and nearly the championship (Byron failed to advance to the championship round in the playoffs due to engine issues at Phoenix).

After his impressive rookie season, Byron would move up to the Xfinity Series in 2017 driving for JR Motorsports. Fugle moved over to KBM's No. 4 truck driven by Christopher Bell and would have another impressive year, as he and Bell won five races and the championship together that year. Like Jones after his championship season with KBM, Bell would also move up to the Xfinity Series full-time the next year driving for JGR, and Fugle was the crew chief for KBM's No. 18 truck driven by Noah Gragson in 2018. Although they only won one race that year, they finished second in the final standings. Gragson would move up to the Xfinity Series driving for JR Motorsports full-time in 2019 like Byron did after his year with Fugle.

In 2019, Fugle would crew chief KBM's No. 51 truck driven by multiple drivers including team owner Kyle Busch and win the owners' championship. In 2020, he returned to the No. 18 truck and was the crew chief for defending ARCA Menards Series champion Christian Eckes in his rookie season in the Truck Series. Although he did make the playoffs, Eckes would only finish eighth in the final standings and not win any races and was released at the end of the season in favor of Chandler Smith. It would was Fugle's worst statistical year as a KBM crew chief.

=== 2021–present: Hendrick Motorsports ===
In 2021, Fugle would reunite with William Byron and be his crew chief in the Cup Series for Hendrick Motorsports, replacing Chad Knaus, who ended his legendary crew chiefing career to become the Vice President of Competition for Hendrick. The two would start the season strong, as Byron went on to win the race at Homestead. It was their only win that year. They would finish tenth in the final standings. In 2022, Fugle and Byron would win two races and finish sixth in the final standings.

In 2023, Byron and Fugle won two of the three races of the West Coast swing at Las Vegas and Phoenix. However, after the race at Phoenix, each of the Hendrick cars would receive an L2 penalty (a four-race crew chief suspension and the loss of 100 driver and owner points) after NASCAR discovered illegally modified hood louvers on the cars during practice for the race. Brian Campe, a technical director for Hendrick, would fill in for Fugle for four races as the interim crew chief for Byron's No. 24 car. At the 2023 Goodyear 400, Byron and Fugle would lead the 24 team to their 100th win in NASCAR history, making the 24 team one of five teams with at least 100 wins.

In 2024, Byron and Fugle started the season by winning the 2024 Daytona 500. The win was the first Daytona 500 win for the No. 24 since 2005 by Jeff Gordon and the first Daytona 500 win for Hendrick Motorsports since 2014. They would win a month later at Circuit of the Americas and at Martinsville on Hendrick Motorsports' 40th anniversary.

In 2025, Byron and Fugle started the season with their second consecutive Daytona 500 win.
