= Hemlock, New York =

- Census-designated place
- Location within New York Location within the United States
- Coordinates: 42°47′38″N 77°36′23″W
- Country: United States
- State: New York
- County: Livingston
- Town: Livonia

Area
  - Total: 1.86 sq mi (4.82 km^{2})
  - Land: 1.86 sq mi (4.82 km^{2})
  - Water: 0 sq mi (0.00 km^{2})
- Elevation: 633 ft (193 m)

Population (2020)
  - Total: 455
  - Density: 244.3/sq mi (94.31/km^{2})
- Time zone: UTC-5 (Eastern (EST))
  - Summer (DST): UTC-4 (EDT)
- ZIP Code: 14466
- Area code: 585
- GNIS feature ID: 952553
- FIPS code: 36-33128

Hemlock is a hamlet and census-designated place (CDP) in the town of Livonia, Livingston County, New York, United States. As of the 2020 census, Hemlock had a population of 455.

The Hemlock post office has a ZIP Code of 14466 and serves the southeast part of the town of Livonia as well as parts of the towns of Richmond and Canadice in Ontario County.

== Geography ==
The Hemlock CDP is in eastern Livingston County. U.S. Route 20A passes through the hamlet, leading north and then west 5 miles (8 km) to Livonia village, and east the same distance to Honeoye. New York State Route 15A joins US 20A in Hemlock, running north out of the hamlet with it but leading north 7.5 miles (12.1 km) to Lima. To the south NY 15A leads 11 miles (18 km) to Springwater.

The CDP extends south to include the hamlet of Glenville, near the north end of Hemlock Lake, one of the Finger Lakes of New York.

According to the U.S. Census Bureau, the CDP has an area of 1.9 square miles (4.8 km^{2}), all land. Hemlock Outlet, flowing north from Hemlock Lake, passes through the center of the CDP and leads northeast to Honeoye Creek, part of the Genesee River watershed.

The Hemlock Fairground is on the western side of the hamlet and is the site of the Hemlock "Little World's" Fair. The fairground buildings and racetrack were added to the National Register of Historic Places in 2000.

== Demographics ==
Historical population
Census	Pop.	Note	%±
2020	455		—
U.S. Decennial Census

== Climate ==
Hemlock has a humid continental climate (Köppen Dfb).

Climate data for Hemlock, New York, 1991–2020 normals, extremes 1898–present
Month	Jan	Feb	Mar	Apr	May	Jun	Jul	Aug	Sep	Oct	Nov	Dec	Year
Record high °F (°C)	70 (21)	74 (23)	79 (26)	89 (32)	92 (33)	95 (35)	100 (38)	98 (37)	97 (36)	88 (31)	79 (26)	70 (21)	100 (38)
Mean maximum °F (°C)	56.7 (13.7)	55.0 (12.8)	65.4 (18.6)	78.3 (25.7)	85.2 (29.6)	88.5 (31.4)	89.6 (32.0)	88.0 (31.1)	85.7 (29.8)	78.2 (25.7)	67.8 (19.9)	57.2 (14.0)	91.3 (32.9)
Mean daily maximum °F (°C)	32.7 (0.4)	34.9 (1.6)	43.4 (6.3)	56.6 (13.7)	68.9 (20.5)	76.7 (24.8)	80.5 (26.9)	78.9 (26.1)	72.5 (22.5)	60.4 (15.8)	48.5 (9.2)	37.8 (3.2)	57.7 (14.2)
Daily mean °F (°C)	24.6 (−4.1)	25.8 (−3.4)	33.5 (0.8)	45.8 (7.7)	57.6 (14.2)	66.2 (19.0)	70.5 (21.4)	68.9 (20.5)	62.6 (17.0)	51.3 (10.7)	40.4 (4.7)	30.8 (−0.7)	48.2 (9.0)
Mean daily minimum °F (°C)	16.5 (−8.6)	16.8 (−8.4)	23.6 (−4.7)	34.9 (1.6)	46.2 (7.9)	55.7 (13.2)	60.4 (15.8)	59.0 (15.0)	52.6 (11.4)	42.2 (5.7)	32.3 (0.2)	23.8 (−4.6)	38.7 (3.7)
Mean minimum °F (°C)	−4.4 (−20.2)	−3.7 (−19.8)	2.7 (−16.3)	21.5 (−5.8)	32.4 (0.2)	42.0 (5.6)	49.2 (9.6)	47.7 (8.7)	39.0 (3.9)	28.6 (−1.9)	17.0 (−8.3)	6.6 (−14.1)	−7.8 (−22.1)
Record low °F (°C)	−28 (−33)	−27 (−33)	−15 (−26)	4 (−16)	16 (−9)	30 (−1)	40 (4)	32 (0)	25 (−4)	17 (−8)	2 (−17)	−22 (−30)	−28 (−33)
Average precipitation inches (mm)	2.15 (55)	1.82 (46)	2.63 (67)	3.03 (77)	3.30 (84)	3.88 (99)	4.19 (106)	3.77 (96)	3.43 (87)	3.72 (94)	2.84 (72)	2.55 (65)	37.31 (948)
Average precipitation days (≥ 0.01 in)	18.4	14.1	14.5	14.1	13.8	13.5	13.4	12.5	12.6	16.4	14.4	16.4	174.1
Source 1: NOAA
Source 2: National Weather Service
