= Livonia Baptist Church =

Historic church in New York, United States

- U.S. National Register of Historic Places
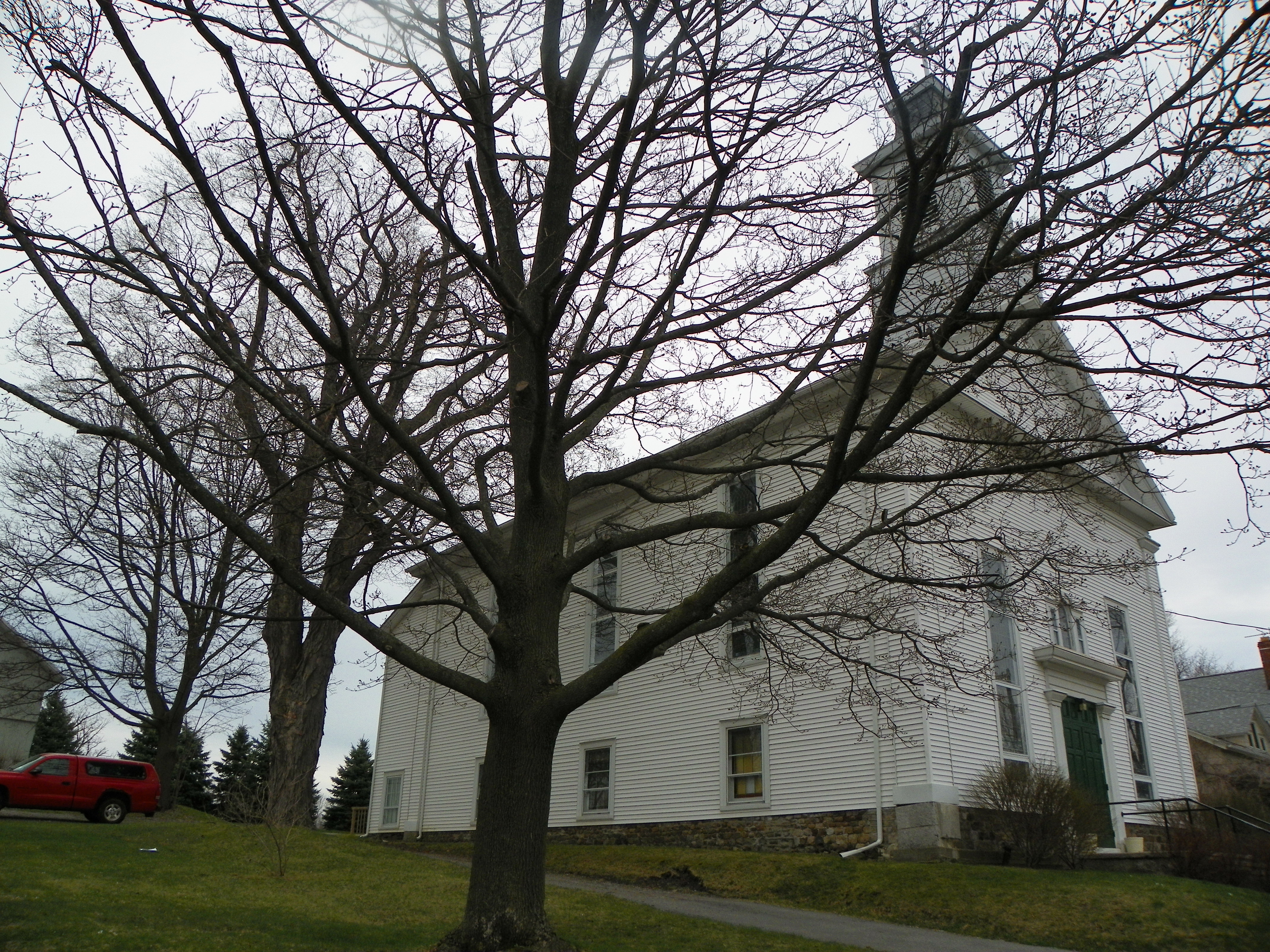

- Location within New York Location within the United States
- Location: 9 High St., Livonia, New York
- Coordinates: 42°49′13″N 77°39′57″W
- Area: 0.1 acres (0.040 ha)
- Built: 1870
- Architect: Gray, Rev.
- Architectural style: Vernacular Greek Revival
- NRHP reference No.: 77000949
- Added to NRHP: March 25, 1977

Livonia Baptist Church, also known as the Livonia Congregational Church and Livonia United Church of Christ, is a historic Baptist church located at Livonia in Livingston County, New York. The building is typical of the vernacular interpretation of the Greek Revival style in 19th century western New York.

It was built by a Baptist congregation in 1870. By the early 20th century, the people changed and in 1924 the church was transferred to Congregational use. In 1964 the United Church of Christ congregation was formed. After it declined, the building was used as a community center.

The building was listed in 1977 on the National Register of Historic Places.
