= Hemlock Fairground =

- U.S. National Register of Historic Places
- U.S. Historic district
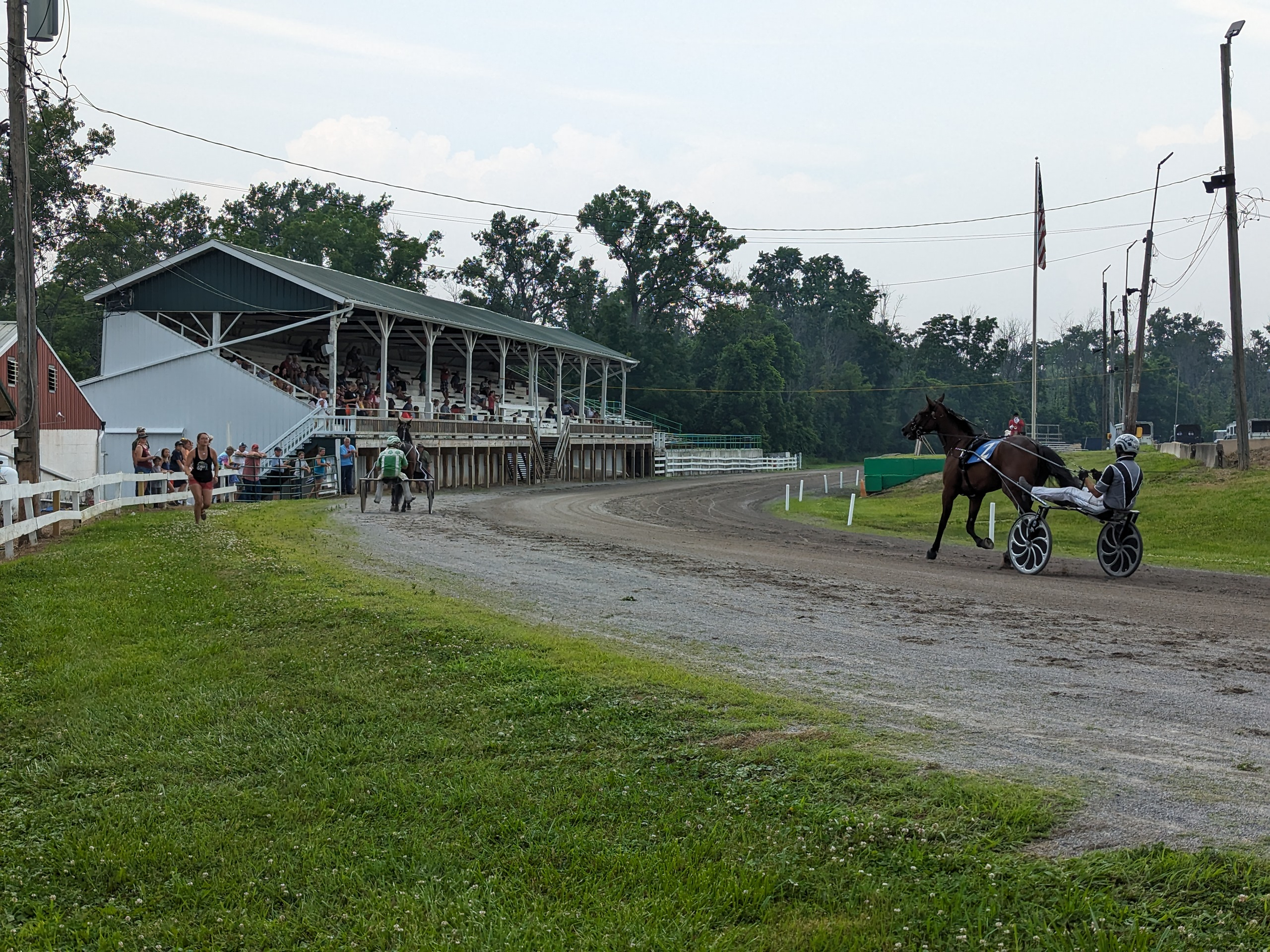
- Harness racing warmup at the Hemlock Fair in 2023

- Location within New York Location within the United States
- Location: East Ave., Hemlock, New York
- Coordinates: 42°47′37″N 77°36′40″W
- Area: 35.6 acres (14.4 ha)
- Architectural style: Late Victorian, Late 19th And 20th Century Revivals
- NRHP reference No.: 00000347
- Added to NRHP: April 06, 2000

Hemlock Fairground is a national historic district and fairground located at Hemlock in Livingston County, New York. It was listed on the National Register of Historic Places in 2000.

== Overview ==
The fairground historic district covers 35.6 acres (144,000 m^{2}) with five contributing buildings and one contributing object, the racetrack. There are two clusters of buildings near the racetrack. One cluster consists of the grandstand (constructed 1870) and livestock sheds located along the perimeter of the track at the southwest corner of the site. The second cluster consists of exhibition buildings located east of the track.

== Events ==
=== Hemlock "Little World's" Fair ===
Each summer during the last week of July, the grounds host a variety of family entertainment, including horse racing, demolition derbies, 4-H exhibitions, a midway from Gillette Shows with games and rides for children of all ages, a petting zoo, food stands, a horse pull, racing pigs, talent show, quilt show, and nightly entertainment in the Festival Building. Evening grandstand events feature such high-powered thrills as demolition derbies, tractor pulls, and monster trucks.

There’s also a historic element to the fair with its collection of artifacts in the fair’s Heritage Museum, a working sawmill, and a historic grandstand.

=== Stock car racing ===
Between 1947 and 1953, a one-half mile oval on the premises regularly hosted NASCAR sanctioned stock car racing under the leadership of Jerry Earl. In 1954 Earl re-focused his efforts to promoting races at the Ontario County Fairgrounds racetrack in nearby Canandaigua, New York.
