= List of NASCAR teams =

NASCAR teams compete in all three national NASCAR series: the Cup Series, O'Reilly Auto Parts Series, and Craftsman Truck Series, as well as in all the regional touring series. A team is limited to four cars in each of the NASCAR series. The team often shares a single manufacturer for all of the team's cars, but each car has an independent car number, driver, and crew chief.

== NASCAR Cup Series ==
All full time teams updated for the 2026 season

=== Full Time ===
- 23XI Racing
- Front Row Motorsports
- Haas Factory Team
- Hendrick Motorsports
- Hyak Motorsports
- Joe Gibbs Racing
- Kaulig Racing
- Legacy Motor Club
- RFK Racing
- Richard Childress Racing
- Rick Ware Racing
- Spire Motorsports
- Trackhouse Racing
- Team Penske
- Wood Brothers Racing

=== Part Time ===
- Beard Motorsports
- Garage 66 (MBM Motorsports)
- JR Motorsports
- Live Fast Motorsports
- NY Racing Team

== NASCAR O'Reilly Auto Parts Series ==
All teams updated for the 2026 season

=== Full–time ===
- Alpha Prime Racing
- Big Machine Racing
- DGM Racing with Jesse Iwuji Motorsports
- Haas Factory Team
- Hendrick Motorsports
- Jeremy Clements Racing
- Joe Gibbs Racing
- Joey Gase Motorsports with Scott Osteen
- Jordan Anderson Racing
- JR Motorsports
- Richard Childress Racing
- RSS Racing
- Sam Hunt Racing
- SS-Green Light Racing with BRK Racing
- Viking Motorsports
- Young's Motorsports

=== Part-time ===
- Barrett–Cope Racing
- Hettinger Racing
- Mike Harmon Racing

== NASCAR Craftsman Truck Series ==
All teams updated for the 2026 season

=== Full-time teams ===
- CR7 Motorsports
- Freedom Racing Enterprises
- Front Row Motorsports
- Halmar Friesen Racing
- Kaulig Racing
- McAnally–Hilgemann Racing
- Niece Motorsports
- Spire Motorsports
- Team Reaume
- ThorSport Racing
- Tricon Garage
- Young's Motorsports

=== Part-time ===
- FDNY Racing
- GK Racing
- Greg Van Alst Motorsports
- Henderson Motorsports
- Hill Motorsports
- MBM Motorsports
- Norm Benning Racing
- Rackley W.A.R.
