= Livonia (village), New York =

Livonia, New York
- Village
- Location within New York Location within the United States
- Coordinates: 42°49′12″N 77°40′5″W
- Country: United States
- State: New York
- County: Livingston
- Town: Livonia

Area
  - Total: 1.01 sq mi (2.62 km^{2})
  - Land: 1.01 sq mi (2.62 km^{2})
  - Water: 0 sq mi (0.00 km^{2})
- Elevation: 1,033 ft (315 m)

Population (2020)
  - Total: 1,472
  - Density: 1,453.7/sq mi (561.26/km^{2})
- Time zone: UTC-5 (Eastern (EST))
  - Summer (DST): UTC-4 (EDT)
- ZIP code: 14487
- Area code: 585
- FIPS code: 36-42950
- GNIS feature ID: 0955754
- Website: www.livoniany.gov

Livonia is a village in the town of Livonia, Livingston County, New York, United States. U.S. Route 20A and Route 15 intersect in the village. The population was 1,409 at the 2010 census, out of 7,809 in the entire town.

== Geography ==
Livonia is located in northeastern Livingston County at 42°49′12″N 77°40′5″W (42.820009, -77.668176), slightly west of the geographic center of the town of Livonia. Unincorporated Livonia Center is 1.5 miles (2.4 km) to the east, and Lakeville, another unincorporated hamlet in the town, is 2 miles (3 km) to the west on Route 20A. Geneseo, the Livingston county seat, is 9 miles (14 km) to the west, and Rochester is 25 miles (40 km) to the north.

According to the United States Census Bureau, the village has a total area of 1.0 square mile (2.6 km^{2}), all land. Wilkins Creek, a tributary of Conesus Lake to the west, flows across the southwestern part of the village, and Little Conesus Creek rises in the northern part of the village. The entire village is within the Genesee River watershed.

== History ==
The region was the territory for centuries of the Seneca people, one of the Five Nations of the Iroquois confederacy. They named the lake Ga-ne-a-sos, meaning "Berry Place". It was transliterated into English as "Conesus."

Solomon Woodruff, a native of Connecticut, settled here in 1789 as the first European American in the area, following the American Revolutionary War. The British ceded their territory to the United States without consulting with the Iroquois nations. Many of the Iroquois Native Americans were forced violently from the state, and settled primarily on a major reserve in Ontario.

The Seneca had to contend with Yankee settlers encroaching on their lands. Woodruff built a rough cabin, cleared a field, and planted his first crop of potatoes before returning to Connecticut for his family. He returned by oxcart with his wife to find that the Seneca had burned the cabin to the ground. (Their son died on the journey and was buried on a hilltop in Bristol, New York.) Woodruff rebuilt the cabin, and some of his descendants still reside in the area. He was buried in the Union cemetery.

The town developed between Conesus and Hemlock lakes, and was largely settled in the mid-19th century by ethnic European Americans from New England and New York. The construction of a railway line in the 1850s to Lakeville increased business opportunities and travel through the region.

The Livonia Baptist Church was added to the National Register of Historic Places in 1977.

== Demographics ==
Historical population
Census	Pop.	Note	%±
1880	688		—
1890	738		7.3%
1900	865		17.2%
1910	823		−4.9%
1920	743		−9.7%
1930	774		4.2%
1940	751		−3.0%
1950	837		11.5%
1960	946		13.0%
1970	1,278		35.1%
1980	1,238		−3.1%
1990	1,434		15.8%
2000	1,373		−4.3%
2010	1,409		2.6%
2020	1,472		4.5%
U.S. Decennial Census

As of the census of 2000, there were 1,373 people, 534 households, and 370 families residing in the village. The population density was 1,343.5 inhabitants per square mile (518.7/km^{2}). There were 560 housing units at an average density of 548.0 per square mile (211.6/km^{2}). The racial makeup of the village was 97.31% White, 0.87% Black or African American, 0.36% Native American, 0.22% Asian, 0.07% from other races, and 1.17% from two or more races. Hispanic or Latino of any race were 1.02% of the population.

There were 534 households, out of which 40.3% had children under the age of 18 living with them, 51.9% were married couples living together, 13.7% had a female householder with no husband present, and 30.7% were non-families. 25.5% of all households were made up of individuals, and 11.0% had someone living alone who was 65 years of age or older. The average household size was 2.57 and the average family size was 3.09.

In the village, the population was spread out, with 30.6% under the age of 18, 6.6% from 18 to 24, 30.0% from 25 to 44, 22.3% from 45 to 64, and 10.5% who were 65 years of age or older. The median age was 35 years. For every 100 females, there were 94.5 males. For every 100 females age 18 and over, there were 89.1 males.

The median income for a household in the village was $49,688, and the median income for a family was $55,096. Males had a median income of $41,310 versus $25,069 for females. The per capita income for the village was $21,115. About 3.5% of families and 6.0% of the population were below the poverty line, including 9.9% of those under age 18 and 6.5% of those age 65 or over.
