= 2024 Cook Out 400 (Martinsville) =

NASCAR Cup Series race

Race details
- Race 8 of 36 in the 2024 NASCAR Cup Series
- Date: April 7, 2024
- Location: Martinsville Speedway in Ridgeway, Virginia
- Course: Permanent racing facility
- Course length: 0.526 miles (0.847 km)
- Distance: 415 laps, 218.29 mi (351.51 km)
- Scheduled distance: 400 laps, 210.4 mi (338.8 km)
- Average speed: 76.096 miles per hour (122.465 km/h)

Pole position
Driver	Kyle Larson	Hendrick Motorsports
- Time: 19.718

Most laps led
Driver	William Byron	Hendrick Motorsports
- Laps: 88

Winner
No. 24	William Byron	Hendrick Motorsports

Television in the United States
- Network: FS1
- Announcers: Mike Joy, Clint Bowyer, and Kevin Harvick

Radio in the United States
- Radio: MRN
- Booth announcers: Alex Hayden, Jeff Striegle, and Todd Gordon
- Turn announcers: Dave Moody (Backstretch)

The 2024 Cook Out 400 was a NASCAR Cup Series race held on April 7, 2024, at Martinsville Speedway in Ridgeway, Virginia. Contested over 415 laps—extended from 400 laps due to an overtime finish, on the 0.526 mile (0.847 km) paperclip-shaped short track, it was the eighth race of the 2024 NASCAR Cup Series season. William Byron won the race. Kyle Larson finished 2nd, and Chase Elliott finished 3rd, becoming the first pair of teammates to sweep the podium at Martinsville in its 76 year history. Bubba Wallace and Ryan Blaney rounded out the top five, and Joey Logano, Tyler Reddick, Alex Bowman, Ryan Preece, and Chase Briscoe rounded out the top ten.

== Report ==
=== Background ===
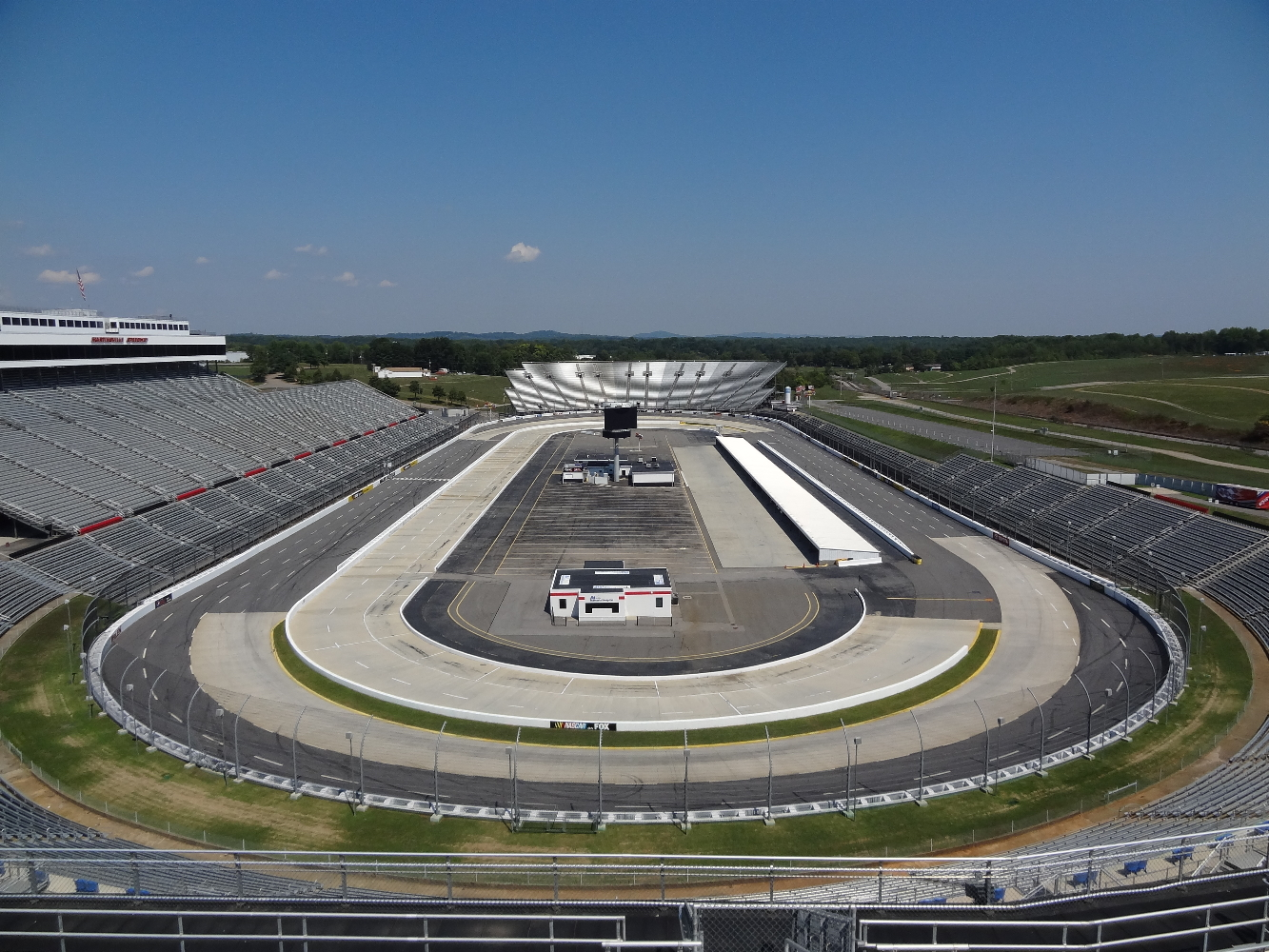
Martinsville Speedway, the track where the race was held.

Martinsville Speedway is a NASCAR-owned stock car racing track located in Henry County, in Ridgeway, Virginia, just to the south of Martinsville. At 0.526 miles (0.847 km) in length, it is the shortest track in the NASCAR Cup Series. The track was also one of the first paved oval tracks in NASCAR, being built in 1947 by H. Clay Earles. It is also the only remaining race track on the NASCAR circuit since its beginning in 1948.

==== Entry list ====
- (R) denotes rookie driver.
- (i) denotes driver who is ineligible for series driver points.

No.	Driver	Team	Manufacturer
1	Ross Chastain	Trackhouse Racing	Chevrolet
2	Austin Cindric	Team Penske	Ford
3	Austin Dillon	Richard Childress Racing	Chevrolet
4	Josh Berry (R)	Stewart–Haas Racing	Ford
5	Kyle Larson	Hendrick Motorsports	Chevrolet
6	Brad Keselowski	RFK Racing	Ford
7	Corey LaJoie	Spire Motorsports	Chevrolet
8	Kyle Busch	Richard Childress Racing	Chevrolet
9	Chase Elliott	Hendrick Motorsports	Chevrolet
10	Noah Gragson	Stewart–Haas Racing	Ford
11	Denny Hamlin	Joe Gibbs Racing	Toyota
12	Ryan Blaney	Team Penske	Ford
14	Chase Briscoe	Stewart–Haas Racing	Ford
15	Kaz Grala (R)	Rick Ware Racing	Ford
16	Josh Williams (i)	Kaulig Racing	Chevrolet
17	Chris Buescher	RFK Racing	Ford
19	Martin Truex Jr.	Joe Gibbs Racing	Toyota
20	Christopher Bell	Joe Gibbs Racing	Toyota
21	Harrison Burton	Wood Brothers Racing	Ford
22	Joey Logano	Team Penske	Ford
23	Bubba Wallace	23XI Racing	Toyota
24	William Byron	Hendrick Motorsports	Chevrolet
31	Daniel Hemric	Kaulig Racing	Chevrolet
34	Michael McDowell	Front Row Motorsports	Ford
38	Todd Gilliland	Front Row Motorsports	Ford
41	Ryan Preece	Stewart–Haas Racing	Ford
42	John Hunter Nemechek	Legacy Motor Club	Toyota
43	Erik Jones	Legacy Motor Club	Toyota
45	Tyler Reddick	23XI Racing	Toyota
47	Ricky Stenhouse Jr.	JTG Daugherty Racing	Chevrolet
48	Alex Bowman	Hendrick Motorsports	Chevrolet
51	Justin Haley	Rick Ware Racing	Ford
54	Ty Gibbs	Joe Gibbs Racing	Toyota
66	David Starr (i)	MBM Motorsports	Ford
71	Zane Smith (R)	Spire Motorsports	Chevrolet
77	Carson Hocevar (R)	Spire Motorsports	Chevrolet
99	Daniel Suárez	Trackhouse Racing	Chevrolet
Official entry list

== Practice ==
Corey LaJoie was the fastest in the practice session with a time of 20.020 seconds and a speed of 94.585 mph (152.220 km/h).

=== Practice results ===
Pos	No.	Driver	Team	Manufacturer	Time	Speed
1	7	Corey LaJoie	Spire Motorsports	Chevrolet	20.020	94.585
2	23	Bubba Wallace	23XI Racing	Toyota	20.063	94.383
3	41	Ryan Preece	Stewart-Haas Racing	Ford	20.088	94.265
Official practice results

== Qualifying ==
Kyle Larson scored the pole for the race with a time of 19.718 and a speed of 96.034 mph (154.552 km/h).

=== Qualifying results ===
Pos	No.	Driver	Team	Manufacturer	R1	R2
1	5	Kyle Larson	Hendrick Motorsports	Chevrolet	19.641	19.718
2	23	Bubba Wallace	23XI Racing	Toyota	19.798	19.719
3	9	Chase Elliott	Hendrick Motorsports	Chevrolet	19.665	19.752
4	19	Martin Truex Jr.	Joe Gibbs Racing	Toyota	19.888	19.753
5	14	Chase Briscoe	Stewart-Haas Racing	Ford	19.870	19.760
6	22	Joey Logano	Team Penske	Ford	19.729	19.764
7	4	Josh Berry (R)	Stewart-Haas Racing	Ford	19.700	19.765
8	11	Denny Hamlin	Joe Gibbs Racing	Toyota	19.674	19.779
9	12	Ryan Blaney	Team Penske	Ford	19.913	19.816
10	48	Alex Bowman	Hendrick Motorsports	Chevrolet	19.885	19.831
11	8	Kyle Busch	Richard Childress Racing	Chevrolet	19.773	—
12	1	Ross Chastain	Trackhouse Racing	Chevrolet	19.918	—
13	6	Brad Keselowski	RFK Racing	Ford	19.825	—
14	2	Austin Cindric	Team Penske	Ford	19.918	—
15	54	Ty Gibbs	Joe Gibbs Racing	Toyota	19.834	—
16	38	Todd Gilliland	Front Row Motorsports	Ford	19.921	—
17	43	Erik Jones	Legacy Motor Club	Toyota	19.843	—
18	24	William Byron	Hendrick Motorsports	Chevrolet	19.944	—
19	45	Tyler Reddick	23XI Racing	Toyota	19.857	—
20	20	Christopher Bell	Joe Gibbs Racing	Toyota	19.950	—
21	99	Daniel Suárez	Trackhouse Racing	Chevrolet	19.886	—
22	41	Ryan Preece	Stewart-Haas Racing	Ford	19.963	—
23	47	Ricky Stenhouse Jr.	JTG Daugherty Racing	Chevrolet	19.926	—
24	71	Zane Smith (R)	Spire Motorsports	Chevrolet	19.988	—
25	77	Carson Hocevar (R)	Spire Motorsports	Chevrolet	19.946	—
26	10	Noah Gragson	Stewart-Haas Racing	Ford	20.012	—
27	51	Justin Haley	Rick Ware Racing	Ford	19.968	—
28	3	Austin Dillon	Richard Childress Racing	Chevrolet	20.016	—
29	42	John Hunter Nemechek	Legacy Motor Club	Toyota	20.045	—
30	17	Chris Buescher	RFK Racing	Ford	20.023	—
31	15	Kaz Grala (R)	Rick Ware Racing	Ford	20.173	—
32	7	Corey LaJoie	Spire Motorsports	Chevrolet	20.098	—
33	16	Josh Williams (i)	Kaulig Racing	Chevrolet	20.182	—
34	21	Harrison Burton	Wood Brothers Racing	Ford	20.115	—
35	34	Michael McDowell	Front Row Motorsports	Ford	20.208	—
36	31	Daniel Hemric	Kaulig Racing	Chevrolet	20.158	—
37	66	David Starr (i)	MBM Motorsports	Ford	21.109	—
Official qualifying results

== Race ==
=== Race results ===
==== Stage results ====
Stage One Laps: 80

Pos	No	Driver	Team	Manufacturer	Points
1	5	Kyle Larson	Hendrick Motorsports	Chevrolet	10
2	23	Bubba Wallace	23XI Racing	Toyota	9
3	9	Chase Elliott	Hendrick Motorsports	Chevrolet	8
4	14	Chase Briscoe	Stewart-Haas Racing	Ford	7
5	19	Martin Truex Jr.	Joe Gibbs Racing	Toyota	6
6	22	Joey Logano	Team Penske	Ford	5
7	11	Denny Hamlin	Joe Gibbs Racing	Toyota	4
8	24	William Byron	Hendrick Motorsports	Chevrolet	3
9	4	Josh Berry (R)	Stewart-Haas Racing	Ford	2
10	8	Kyle Busch	Richard Childress Racing	Chevrolet	1
Official stage one results

Stage Two Laps: 100

Pos	No	Driver	Team	Manufacturer	Points
1	11	Denny Hamlin	Joe Gibbs Racing	Toyota	10
2	23	Bubba Wallace	23XI Racing	Toyota	9
3	5	Kyle Larson	Hendrick Motorsports	Chevrolet	8
4	9	Chase Elliott	Hendrick Motorsports	Chevrolet	7
5	22	Joey Logano	Team Penske	Ford	6
6	48	Alex Bowman	Hendrick Motorsports	Chevrolet	5
7	14	Chase Briscoe	Stewart-Haas Racing	Ford	4
8	24	William Byron	Hendrick Motorsports	Chevrolet	3
9	1	Ross Chastain	Trackhouse Racing	Chevrolet	2
10	4	Josh Berry (R)	Stewart-Haas Racing	Ford	1
Official stage two results

=== Final stage results ===
Stage Three Laps: 220

Pos	Grid	No	Driver	Team	Manufacturer	Laps	Points
1	18	24	William Byron	Hendrick Motorsports	Chevrolet	415	46
2	1	5	Kyle Larson	Hendrick Motorsports	Chevrolet	415	53
3	3	9	Chase Elliott	Hendrick Motorsports	Chevrolet	415	49
4	2	23	Bubba Wallace	23XI Racing	Toyota	415	51
5	9	12	Ryan Blaney	Team Penske	Ford	415	32
6	6	22	Joey Logano	Team Penske	Ford	415	42
7	19	45	Tyler Reddick	23XI Racing	Toyota	415	30
8	10	48	Alex Bowman	Hendrick Motorsports	Chevrolet	415	34
9	22	41	Ryan Preece	Stewart-Haas Racing	Ford	415	28
10	5	14	Chase Briscoe	Stewart-Haas Racing	Ford	415	38
11	8	11	Denny Hamlin	Joe Gibbs Racing	Toyota	415	40
12	17	43	Erik Jones	Legacy Motor Club	Toyota	415	25
13	16	38	Todd Gilliland	Front Row Motorsports	Ford	415	24
14	12	1	Ross Chastain	Trackhouse Racing	Chevrolet	415	25
15	30	17	Chris Buescher	RFK Racing	Ford	414	22
16	11	8	Kyle Busch	Richard Childress Racing	Chevrolet	414	22
17	25	77	Carson Hocevar (R)	Spire Motorsports	Chevrolet	414	20
18	4	19	Martin Truex Jr.	Joe Gibbs Racing	Toyota	414	25
19	15	54	Ty Gibbs	Joe Gibbs Racing	Toyota	414	18
20	26	10	Noah Gragson	Stewart-Haas Racing	Ford	414	17
21	35	34	Michael McDowell	Front Row Motorsports	Ford	414	16
22	21	99	Daniel Suárez	Trackhouse Racing	Chevrolet	414	15
23	14	2	Austin Cindric	Team Penske	Ford	414	14
24	13	6	Brad Keselowski	RFK Racing	Ford	414	13
25	7	4	Josh Berry (R)	Stewart-Haas Racing	Ford	413	15
26	31	15	Kaz Grala (R)	Rick Ware Racing	Ford	413	11
27	33	16	Josh Williams (i)	Kaulig Racing	Chevrolet	413	0
28	36	31	Daniel Hemric	Kaulig Racing	Chevrolet	413	9
29	23	47	Ricky Stenhouse Jr.	JTG Daugherty Racing	Chevrolet	413	8
30	27	51	Justin Haley	Rick Ware Racing	Ford	413	7
31	24	71	Zane Smith (R)	Spire Motorsports	Chevrolet	412	6
32	32	7	Corey LaJoie	Spire Motorsports	Chevrolet	412	5
33	34	21	Harrison Burton	Wood Brothers Racing	Ford	412	4
34	28	3	Austin Dillon	Richard Childress Racing	Chevrolet	412	3
35	20	20	Christopher Bell	Joe Gibbs Racing	Toyota	411	2
36	29	42	John Hunter Nemechek	Legacy Motor Club	Toyota	396	1
37	37	66	David Starr (i)	MBM Motorsports	Ford	311	0
Official race results

=== Race statistics ===
- Lead changes: 13 among 8 different drivers
- Cautions/Laps: 5 for 51 laps
- Red flags: 0
- Time of race: 2 hours, 52 minutes and 7 seconds
- Average speed: 76.096 miles per hour (122.465 km/h)

== Media ==
=== Television ===
Fox Sports covered their 24th race at the Martinsville Speedway. Mike Joy, 2018 Spring Martinsville winner Clint Bowyer and 2011 Spring Martinsville winner Kevin Harvick called the race from the broadcast booth. Jamie Little and Regan Smith handled pit road for the television side, and Larry McReynolds provided insight from the Fox Sports studio in Charlotte.

FS1
Booth announcers	Pit reporters	In-race analyst
Lap-by-lap: Mike Joy; Color-commentator: Clint Bowyer; Color-commentator: Kevin Harvick	Jamie Little; Regan Smith	Larry McReynolds

=== Radio ===
MRN had the radio call for the race which was also simulcasted on Sirius XM NASCAR Radio. Alex Hayden, Jeff Striegle, & former championship winning crew chief Todd Gordon called the race in the booth when the field raced down the frontstretch. Dave Moody called the race from a platform inside the backstretch when the field races down the backstretch. Steve Post, Kim Coon, and Brienne Pedigo worked the pit road for the radio side.

MRN
Booth announcers	Turn announcers	Pit reporters
Lead announcer: Alex Hayden; Announcer: Jeff Striegle; Announcer: Todd Gordon	Backstretch: Dave Moody	Steve Post; Kim Coon; Brienne Pedigo

== Standings after the race ==
Drivers' Championship standings

	Pos	Driver	Points
1	1	Kyle Larson	309
1	2	Martin Truex Jr.	295 (–14)
	3	Denny Hamlin	292 (–17)
3	4	William Byron	261 (–48)
	5	Ryan Blaney	261 (–48)
2	6	Chase Elliott	258 (–51)
3	7	Ty Gibbs	254 (–55)
1	8	Ross Chastain	232 (–77)
1	9	Tyler Reddick	229 (–80)
1	10	Alex Bowman	227 (–82)
5	11	Christopher Bell	221 (–88)
2	12	Bubba Wallace	216 (–93)
1	13	Chris Buescher	207 (–102)
5	14	Joey Logano	191 (–118)
2	15	Kyle Busch	189 (–120)
2	16	Chase Briscoe	188 (–121)
Official driver's standings

Manufacturers' Championship standings

Pos	Manufacturer	Points
1	Chevrolet	298
2	Toyota	289 (–9)
3	Ford	262 (–36)

- Note: Only the first 16 positions are included for the driver standings.

Previous race: 2024 Toyota Owners 400	NASCAR Cup Series; 2024 season	Next race: 2024 Autotrader EchoPark Automotive 400
