= Conesus Lake =

Lake in Livingston County, New York, US

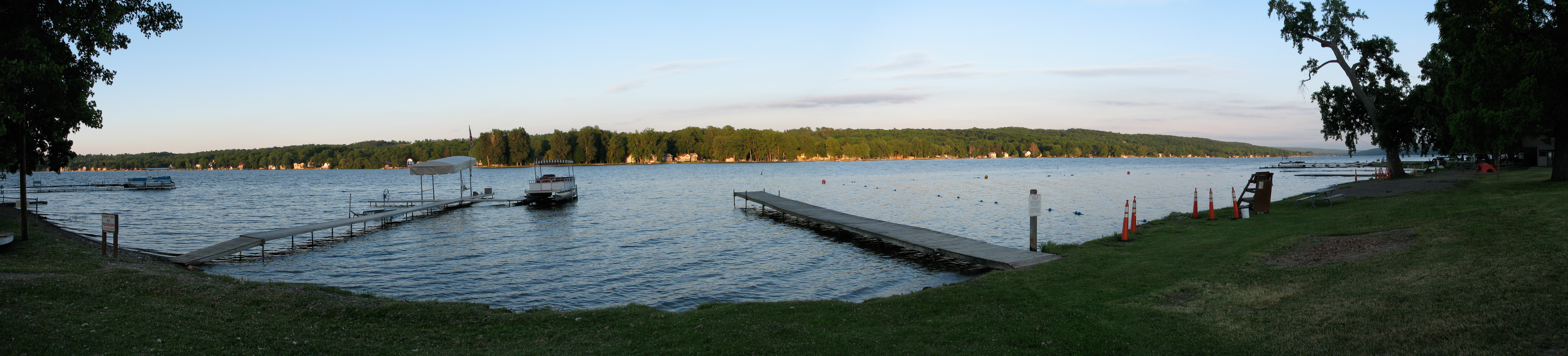
- The east shore, seen from Long Point Park

- Location within New York Conesus Lake (the United States)
- Location: Livingston County, New York, United States
- Group: Finger Lakes
- Coordinates: 42°46′47″N 77°43′00″W
- Lake type: Ground moraine
- Primary inflows: Conesus Inlet, Wilking Creek, Denshore Gully, Sand Point Gully, Long Point Gully, North Gully, South Gully, Cottonwood Gully, North Mc Millian Creek
- Primary outflows: Conesus Creek
- Basin countries: United States
- Max. length: 8 miles (13 km)
- Max. width: 1 mi (1.6 km)
- Surface area: 3,420 acres (1,380 ha)
- Average depth: 38 ft (12 m)
- Max. depth: 66 ft (20 m)
- Water volume: .039 cu mi (0.16 km^{3})
- Shore length^{1}: 18.5 miles (29.8 km)
- Surface elevation: 817 ft (249 m)
- Settlements: Livonia, New York
- ^{1} Shore length is not a well-defined measure.

The eleven Finger Lakes of New York State.

Conesus Lake /kəˈniːʃəs/ is a Finger Lake in Livingston County in western New York state. The fifth smallest of eleven, it is located off Interstate 390 about 15 miles (24 km) south of Interstate 90.

== Description ==
Conesus Lake is eight miles (13 km) long, with a maximum depth of 66 feet (20 m). It flows south to north, from its inlet in the Town of Conesus to its outlet, Conesus Creek, in Lakeville, a hamlet in the Town of Livonia in Livingston County. Conesus Creek in turn flows into the Genesee River near Avon.

The first steamboat on Conesus Lake was named the "Jessie" launched July 1, 1874.

In August 2006, the New York State Department of Environmental Conservation confirmed that the lake was the first outside the contiguous Great Lakes waterways to be stricken with a new strain of viral hemorrhagic septicemia (VHS), an infectious fish disease responsible for mass die-offs of many species, but not linked to any human health concerns. The disease is spread between waterways through live or frozen bait fish, roe, contaminated fishing equipment or live water wells in boats.

== Recreation ==
On July 3 of each year, the residents of the lake participate in a tradition called the "Ring of Fire", sponsored by the Conesus Lake Association. Participants light road flares around the lake and shoot off fireworks. The festivities typically start at dusk, with approximately 10,000 flares lit at 10:00 PM.

When frozen over in the winter, Conesus Lake is used for snowmobiling and ice fishing.

=== Fishing ===
Fish species present in the lake include walleye, northern pike, yellow perch, smallmouth bass, largemouth bass, and tiger muskie. Access is available via state owned hard surface ramp off East Lake Road, a state owned hand launch access on Pebble Beach Road in the hamlet of Lakeville, a state owned hand launch access on US-20A in the hamlet of Lakeville, or at a car top launch access on the south shore off NY-256.

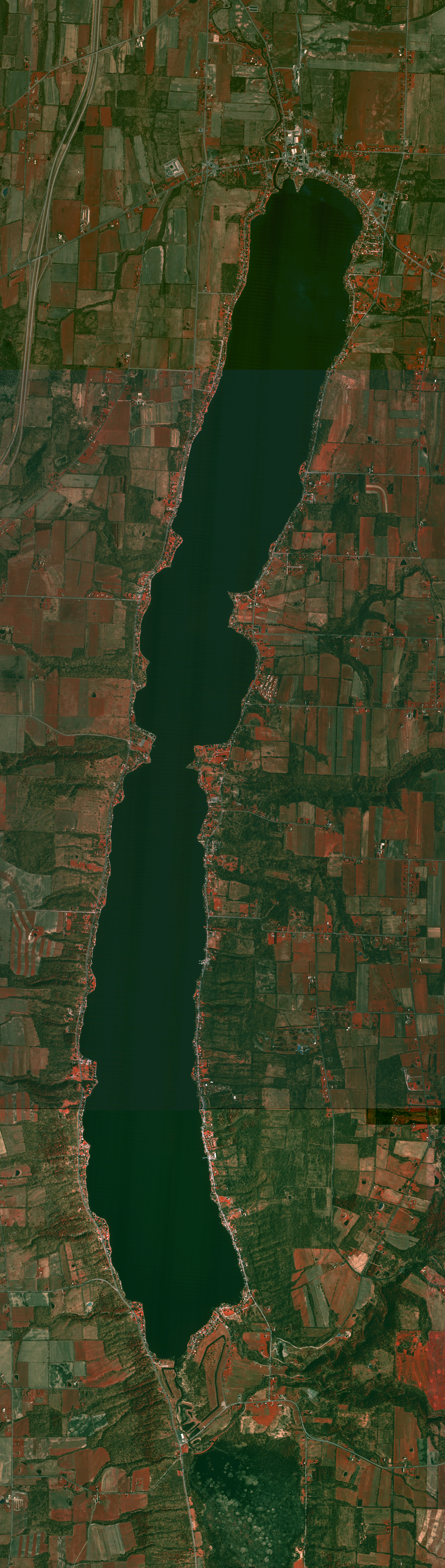
Aerial view of Conesus Lake

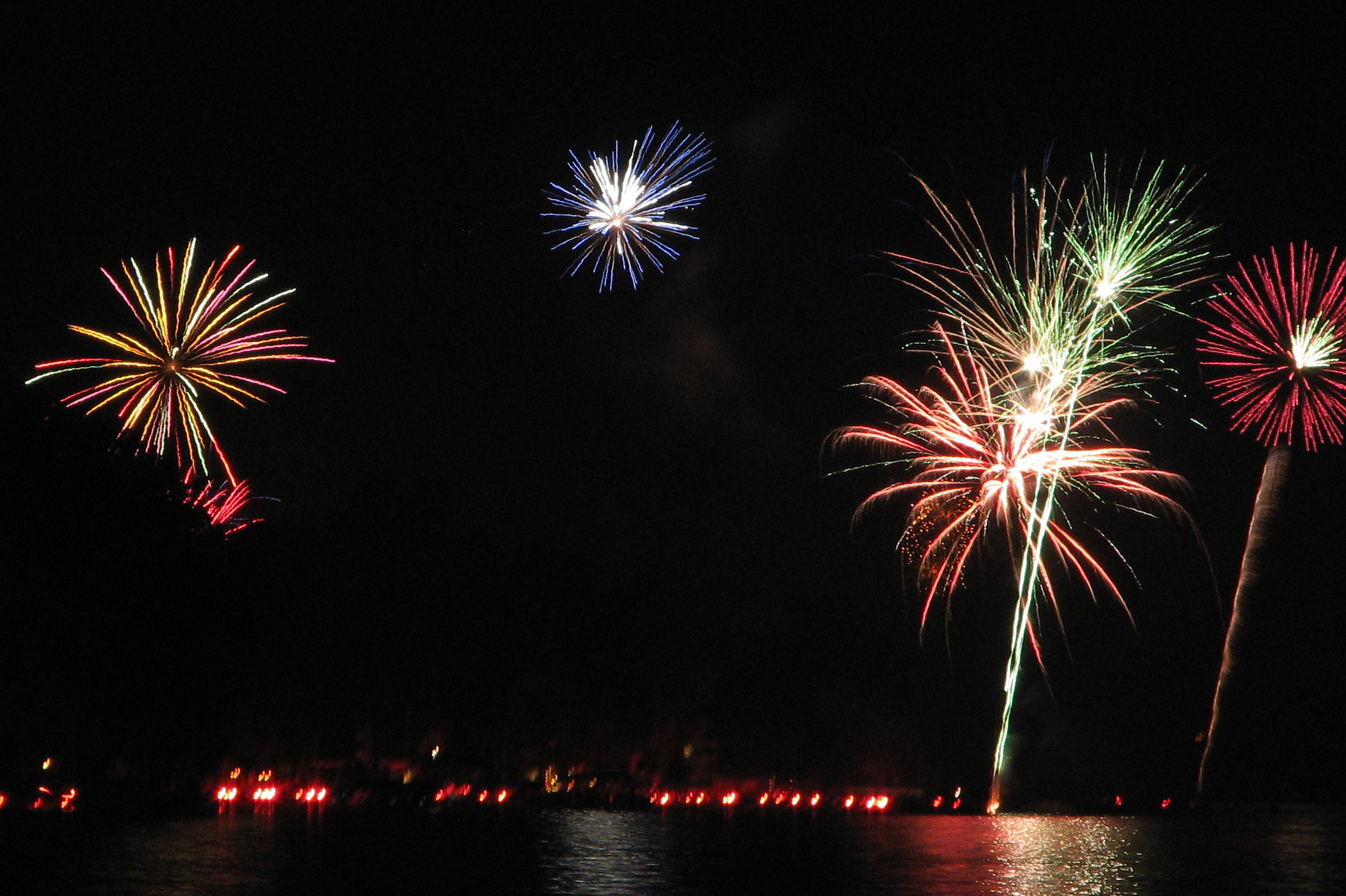
Fireworks during the Ring of Fire; the red lights at the bottom are flares

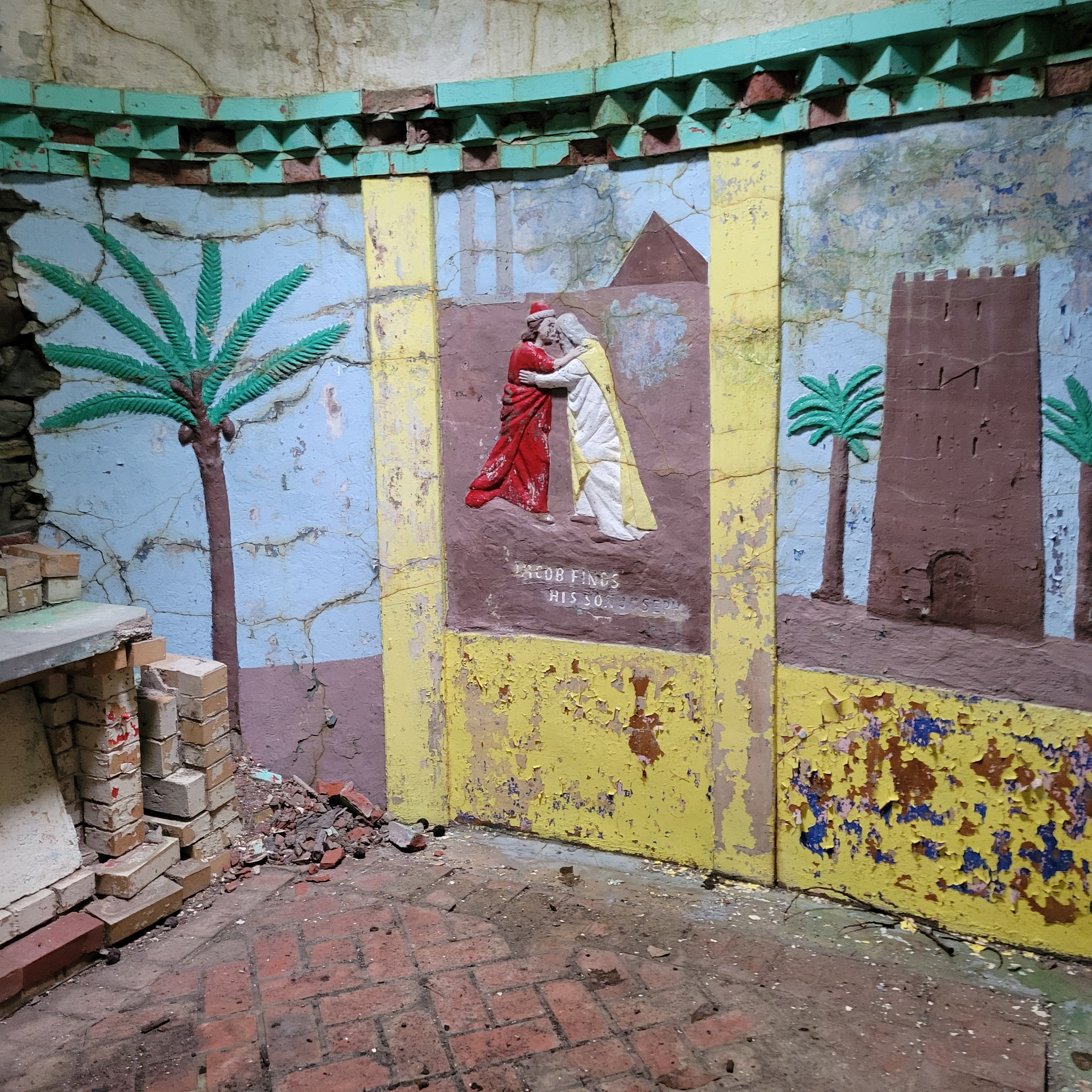
Artwork in Building Formerly Known as St. Michael's Mission in 2024
