= Conesus Creek =

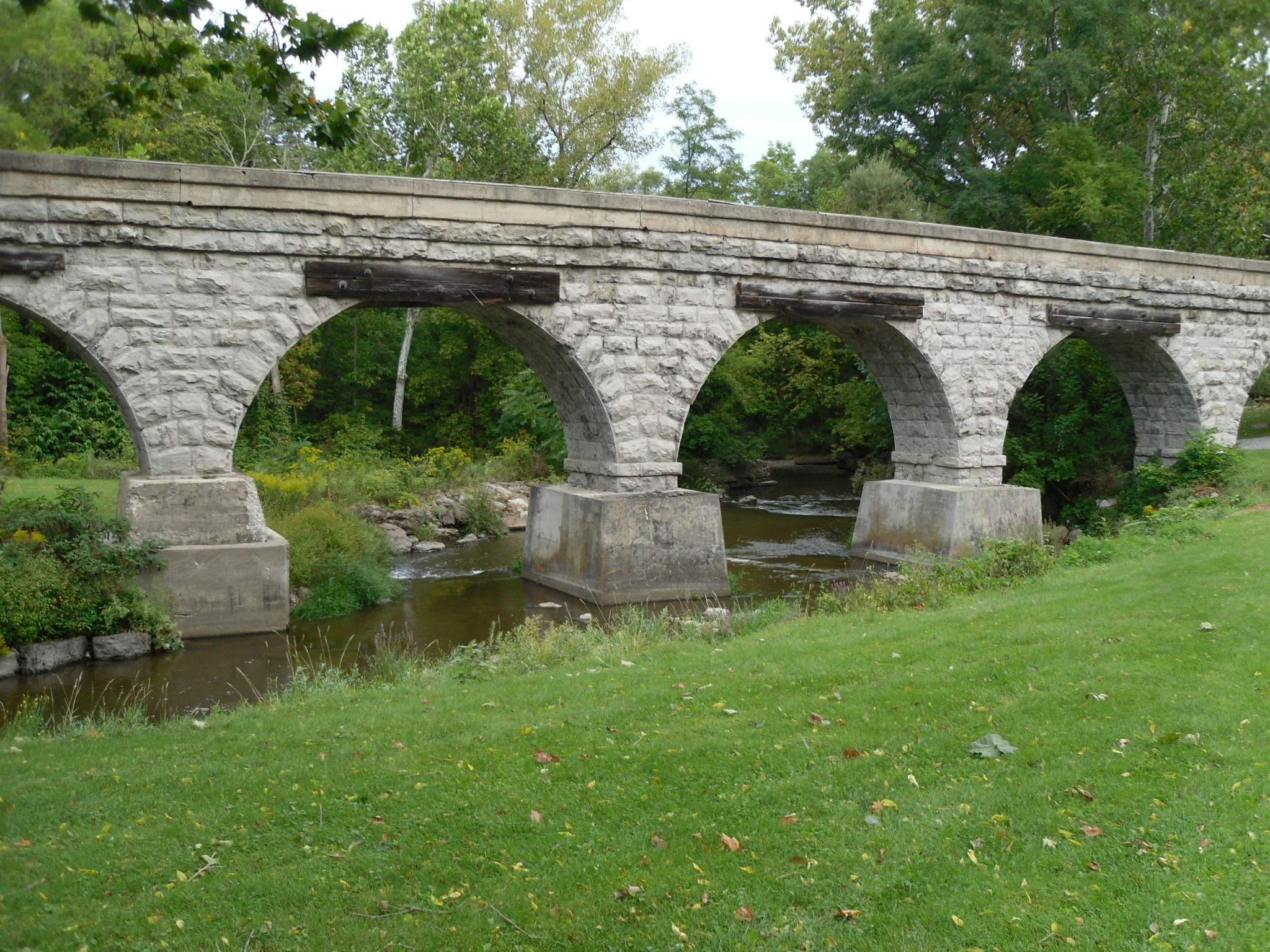

- Location of the mouth of the Conesus Creek in New York State. Conesus Creek (the United States)

Location
- Country: United States
- State: New York

Physical characteristics
- Source: Conesus Lake
  - location: Livingston County
  - coordinates: 42°50′04″N 77°42′17″W
- Mouth: Genesee River
  - location: Avon, Livingston County
  - coordinates: 42°54′46″N 77°46′02″W

Conesus Creek, also known as the Conesus Outlet, is a small tributary of the Genesee River in Livingston County, New York, United States. Its source is the outflow of Conesus Lake, and it joins the Genesee in the town of Avon. The creek drops over 200 feet (61 m) in elevation over its short course.

== Navigability ==
Canoeing the creek is not recommended. While appearing to be a gentle ride as the creek begins in Lakeville, it soon becomes hazardous. As the creek passes under Interstate 390, a forest lines the bank. Many trees have fallen into the creek, some forming strainers, others spanning the full breadth. Also the rate of drop in elevation increases and there are two waterfalls. The first, Triphammer Falls, is easily portaged; the second, while in a park, is preceded by a small gorge and could be deadly to inexperienced paddlers. There is also a landowner who has put barbed wire fencing across the creek to enclose a horse pasture.
