= Honeoye =

Honeoye /ˈhʌni.ɔɪ/ may refer to:

- Honeoye, New York, a hamlet in Ontario County, New York, at the north end of Honeoye Lake
- Honeoye Creek, a tributary of the Genesee River in western New York
- Honeoye Falls, New York, a village in Monroe County on Honeoye Creek
- Honeoye Lake, the source of Honeoye Creek
