= Geography of New York =

Geography of New York may refer to:

- Geography of New York (state)
- Geography of New York City
