= Honeoye Central School District =

School district in New York, United States

Address
- 8528 Main Street Honeoye, New York, 14471; United States

District information
- Type: Public
- Grades: PreK–12
- NCES District ID: 3614670

Students and staff
- Students: 601 (2020–2021)
- Teachers: 71.5 (on an FTE basis)
- Staff: 87.0 (on an FTE basis)
- Student–teacher ratio: 8.41:1

Other information
- Website: www.honeoye.org

The Honeoye Central School District is a public school district in New York State that serves 619 students in 86 square miles (220 km^{2}) in the hamlet of Honeoye and the town of Richmond in Ontario County with a staff of 227 (140 instructional personnel and 87 support staff).

The average class size is 17 students (all grades). With each graduating class having an average of 45 students (Lowest level has 32, highest grade level is 58) The student-teacher ratio is 10:1.
