= Honeoye Lake Boat Launch State Park =

State park in Ontario County, New York

Coordinates: 42°43′32″N 77°30′26″W

Honeoye Lake Boat Launch State Park is a nine-acre (3.6 ha) state park located along the southeastern shore of Honeoye Lake, one of New York's Finger Lakes. The park is located in Ontario County off East Lake Road, and offers a boat launch in addition to facilitating lake access for fishing and ice fishing.

== See also ==
- List of New York state parks
