= Jeannette Klute =

American photographer (1918–2009)

- Born: 1918; Rochester, NY, US
- Died: August 3, 2009 (aged 90–91); Honeoye, NY, US
- Education: Mechanics' Institute; University of Rochester
- Occupation: photographer
- Years active: 1938-1982
- Employer: Eastman Kodak Company
- Known for: development of dye transfer process, pioneering color photography as an art form

Jeannette Klute (1918 – 2009) was an American photographer who helped develop the Dye-transfer process at the Eastman Kodak Company and is credited with demonstrating the artistic possibilities of color photography. Klute also paved the way for women to work in the photography industry.

== Early life ==
Jeannette Klute was born in Rochester, New York, in 1918. She graduated from high school in 1936, then enrolled at the Mechanics' Institute (now known as the Rochester Institute of Technology) in Rochester, where she took classes in the Photographic Technology department. Klute was one of three women in her photography classes, where she studied photographic processes and materials, chemistry, physics, and retouching with the goal of working at the local Eastman Kodak Company (Kodak). She remained a student in the program until 1939, then returned to take classes in advanced photographic technologies and color processes in 1944. She later earned a bachelor's of science degree from the University of Rochester.

== Career ==
Klute began working at Kodak in October 1938 as a lab assistant, one of the few positions available to women at the time. In 1945, she was named head of the color printing group. In 1949, she became a research photographer leading the Visual Research Studio in the Color Technology Division. Here, she tested, developed, and refined the processes and materials used in color photography, including the dye transfer process and Kodachrome. For much of her career, Klute worked as a photographic illustrator for physicist Ralph M. Evans, illustrating many of his lectures, articles, and books, including An Introduction to Color (1948), a seminal text on modern color science.

During the late 1960s to 1970s, Klute supervised the Photographic Technology Studio at Kodak. She hired women for most of the Studio's research photographer and technician positions, which was unprecedented. Klute explained her decision: "...it's good to help prove to the world that women truly do have brains."

Klute often carried her large format camera into the woods and used a shallow depth of field to document the local flora and fauna of the New York Finger Lakes region. She also helped develop a process named “derivations," a more abstract style with saturated color and line. These new developments led to the rise of color photography as an art form. Klute's color photography was exhibited in galleries and museums around the world, including the Smithsonian, the Museum of Modern Art, and the Royal Photographic Society of Great Britain. In 1975, Klute was one of fifty women selected for the groundbreaking exhibition Women in Photography: An Historical Survey, in which she was recognized as "an innovator of color photography."

== Publications ==
In 1954, Jeannette Klute published a deluxe book of her work titled Woodland Portraits. Considered a landmark in the history of color photography, the folio sized book included 50 color plate reproductions of Klute's dye transfer prints featuring the flora and fauna native to the woodlands near her home in Bristol, New York. Klute organized the images by season and accompanied them with poetry to elicit an emotional response from the viewer. The New York Times reviewed the publication in 1954 saying, "The publication of Jeannette Klute's Woodland Portraits is a significant event in photographic literature ... this is pioneering work". After seeing Woodland Portraits, Ansel Adams wrote, "It is magnificent! I think Miss Klute has made a major contribution to creative photography — a new and fresh approach, and avoidance of the sterile color and moods of the greater part of contemporary color photography."

== Exhibitions ==
- Color Photography (1950) at The Museum of Modern Art, curated by Edward Steichen
- Abstraction in Photography (1951) at The Museum of Modern Art
- Christmas Photographs (1951-1952) at The Museum of Modern Art
- Jeannette Klute Photographs (1960) at The Museum of Fine Arts, Houston
- Women in Photography: An Historical Survey (1975) at the San Francisco Museum of Modern Art
- Focus on Color: The Photography of Jeannette Klute (2009) at the Bruce Museum of Arts and Science
- Jeannette Klute: A Photographic Pioneer (2017) at the Rochester Institute of Technology
- Micro/Macro: Views of Earth by Marilyn Bridges and Jeannette Klute (2017-2018) at the Akron Art Museum

== Later years ==
Klute retired from Kodak in 1982 and took up painting. She co-founded the Naples Open Studio Trail, which displayed local artists' work to the public. As of March 2021, the Trail is still active.

Klute died August 3, 2009, at her home in Honeoye, New York.

== Archive ==
An archive of Jeannette Klute's photography and personal papers is held by RIT Archive Collections in Wallace Library at the Rochester Institute of Technology.
