= Harriet Hollister Spencer State Recreation Area =

State park in New York, United States

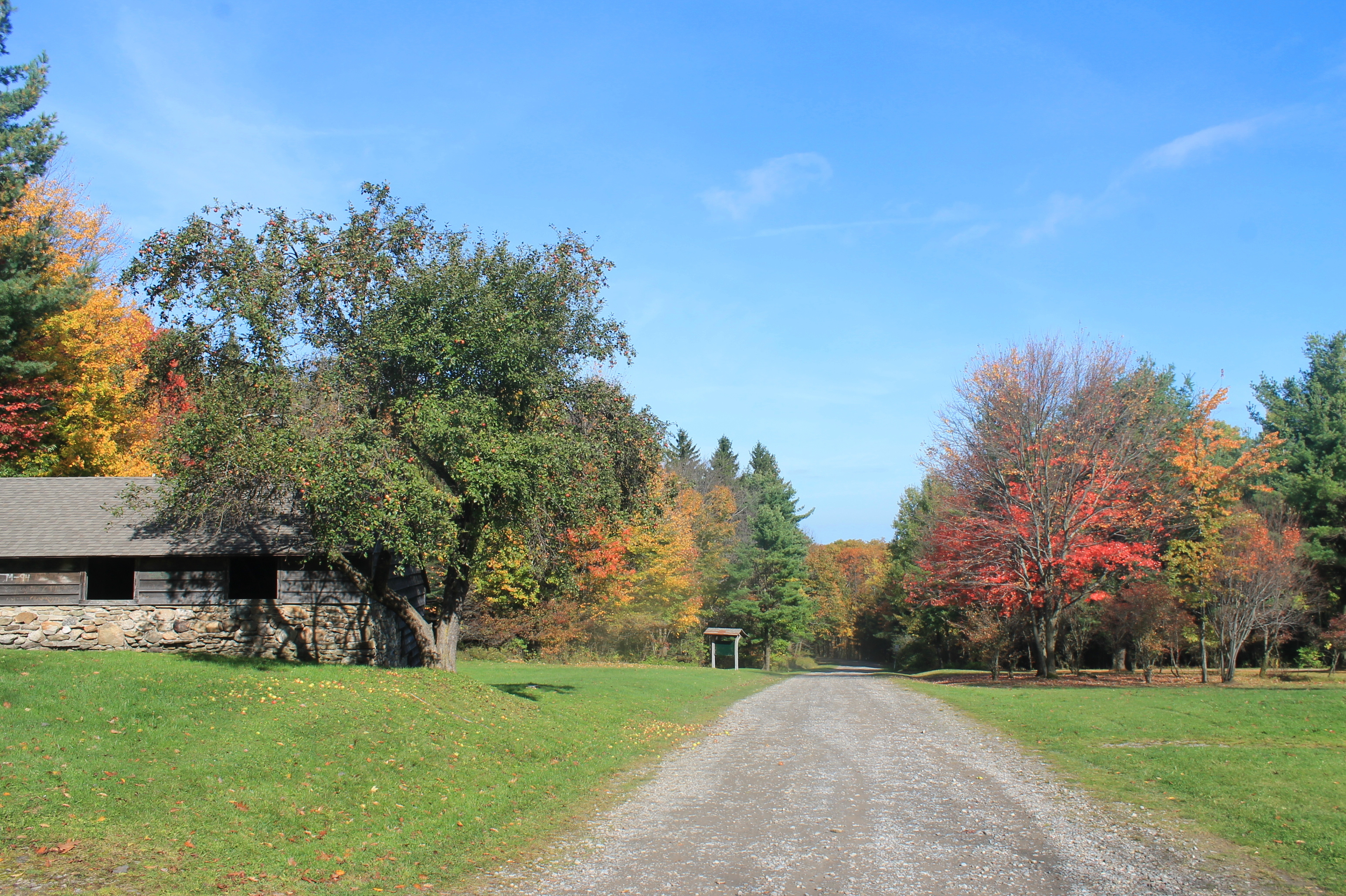
- Picnic area at Harriet Hollister Spencer State Recreation Area, October 2013.

- Location within New York Location within the United States
- Type: State park
- Location: 6775 Canadice Hill Road; Springwater, New York
- Nearest city: Canadice, New York
- Coordinates: 42°41′20″N 77°30′43″W
- Area: 1,550 acres (6.3 km^{2})
- Created: 1962
- Operator: New York State Office of Parks, Recreation and Historic Preservation
- Visitors: 61,392 (in 2014)
- Open: All year
- Website: Harriet Hollister Spencer State Recreation Area

Harriet Hollister Spencer State Recreation Area, also known as the Harriet Hollister Spencer Memorial Recreation Area, is a 1,550-acre (6.3 km^{2}) recreation area and part of the New York state park system. It is located six miles (9.7 km) south of Honeoye, off Canadice Hill Road in the south part of the Town of Canadice in Ontario County, New York.

== History ==
Harriet Hollister Spencer State Recreation Area was created after 679 acres (2.75 km^{2}) of land was given to the state from the estate of Harriet Hollister Spencer, a Rochester horticulturalist, rose expert and civic leader, after her death in 1962.

The recreation area nearly doubled in size after several adjacent parcels were purchased by New York State from The Nature Conservancy starting in the late 2000s. An acquisition of 350 acres (1.4 km^{2}) increased the recreation area's total size to 1,550 acres (6.3 km^{2}) in 2014.

== Park description ==
Open year-round, the recreation area offers panoramic views of the countryside, including Honeoye Lake. The park has one picnic pavilion, and offers hiking, cross-country skiing, and biking trails, and hunting.

== Organizational use ==
Because of its elevation, this recreation area gets more snow than many parks in the area, making it a regional winter sports destination. Sixteen miles (26 km) of trails, ranging in difficulty from novice to expert, are constructed, maintained, and groomed by the Rochester Cross Country Ski Foundation. Cross-country skiing teams often use the park for practice.

The Muller Field Station near this park is utilized often by Finger Lakes Community College's conservation department in monitoring local wildlife populations and training students in valuable methods and techniques, such as imitating scent rubbing.

== See also ==
- List of New York state parks
