= Canadice, New York =

- Town
- Location within the state of New York
- Coordinates: 42°42′58″N 77°33′4″W
- Country: United States
- State: New York
- County: Ontario

Government
  - Type: Town Council
  - Town Supervisor: Kristine Singer (R)
  - Town Council: Members' List: • Mark Statt (R); • Terry Gronwall (R); • Kate Crowley (R); • Fredrick Mitchell (R)

Area
  - Total: 32.44 sq mi (84.01 km^{2})
  - Land: 29.85 sq mi (77.31 km^{2})
  - Water: 2.59 sq mi (6.70 km^{2})
- Elevation: 1,526 ft (465 m)

Population (2020)
  - Total: 1,674 ▲
  - Estimate (2021): 1,677
  - Density: 56.7/sq mi (21.91/km^{2})
- Time zone: UTC-5 (Eastern (EST))
  - Summer (DST): UTC-4 (EDT)
- FIPS code: 36-12100
- GNIS feature ID: 0978782
- Website: www.canadiceny.gov

Canadice is a town in Ontario County, New York, United States. The population was 1,674 at the 2020 census.

The Town of Canadice is in the Finger Lakes region of New York and is in the southwestern part of its county.

== History ==
The name of the town Canadice is a corruption of various words in local languages approximating 'Skaneadice', a common placename meaning 'long lake' which here referred to Canadice Lake. It would originally have been written Ska-ne-o'-dice in Onondaga and Seneca.

When the county was formed, Canadice was within a district named, in turn "Pittstown," "Honeoye," and "Richmond." Settlement began circa 1795 near the shore of Honeoye Lake. The town was first established on April 15, 1829 from the Town of Richmond but was not fully organized until the next year. A part of Canadice was taken back by Richmond in 1836.

As of 1868, There were three churches in the town, Methodist Episcopal, Methodist Protestant and Wesleyan Methodist.

== Geography ==
According to the United States Census Bureau, the town has a total area of 32.5 square miles (84 km^{2}), of which 30.0 square miles (78 km^{2}) is land and 2.4 square miles (6.2 km^{2}) (7.43%) is water.

The eastern town line is partly defined by Honeoye Lake, the western town line by Hemlock Lake, and Canadice Lake is entirely within the town, both minor Finger Lakes.

The southern and western town lines form part of the border of Livingston County.

New York State Route 15A is a north–south highway in the town.

== Demographics ==
Historical population
Census	Pop.	Note	%±
1830	1,386		—
1840	1,341		−3.2%
1850	1,075		−19.8%
1860	1,026		−4.6%
1870	905		−11.8%
1880	895		−1.1%
1890	730		−18.4%
1900	674		−7.7%
1910	559		−17.1%
1920	457		−18.2%
1930	317		−30.6%
1940	324		2.2%
1950	303		−6.5%
1960	558		84.2%
1970	971		74.0%
1980	1,467		51.1%
1990	1,857		26.6%
2000	1,846		−0.6%
2010	1,664		−9.9%
2020	1,674		0.6%
2021 (est.)	1,677		0.2%
U.S. Decennial Census

As of the census of 2000, there were 1,846 people, 774 households, and 516 families residing in the town. The population density was 61.5 inhabitants per square mile (23.7/km^{2}). There were 1,094 housing units at an average density of 36.4 per square mile (14.1/km^{2}). The racial makeup of the town was 98.10% White, 0.49% African American, 0.22% Native American, 0.49% Asian, 0.05% from other races, and 0.65% from two or more races. Hispanic or Latino of any race were 0.92% of the population.

There were 774 households, out of which 27.1% had children under the age of 18 living with them, 54.0% were married couples living together, 7.9% had a female householder with no husband present, and 33.3% were non-families. 24.4% of all households were made up of individuals, and 6.3% had someone living alone who was 65 years of age or older. The average household size was 2.39 and the average family size was 2.83.

In the town, the population was spread out, with 22.7% under the age of 18, 5.4% from 18 to 24, 30.3% from 25 to 44, 28.8% from 45 to 64, and 12.8% who were 65 years of age or older. The median age was 41 years. For every 100 females, there were 103.1 males. For every 100 females age 18 and over, there were 103.6 males.

The median income for a household in the town was $44,893, and the median income for a family was $52,596. Males had a median income of $38,523 versus $26,118 for females. The per capita income for the town was $25,202. About 3.9% of families and 6.4% of the population were below the poverty line, including 8.1% of those under age 18 and 4.2% of those age 65 or over.

== Communities and locations in Canadice ==
- Canadice – The hamlet of Canadice located in the northern part of the town on County Road 37. It was formerly called "Canadice Corners" and was once the only community of note in the town.
- Canadice Hollow – An historic location at the north end of Canadice Lake.
- Canadice Lake – A minor Finger Lake. It is contained entirely within the town.
- Canadice Outlet – A stream flowing out the north end of Canadice Lake.
- Harriet Hollister Spencer State Recreation Area – A state park in the southeast part of the town.
- Hemlock Lake – A minor Finger Lake, forms the west boundary of the town.
- Honeoye Lake – A minor Finger Lake, forms the east boundary of the town.
- Pickett Point a projection into Honeoye Lake.
- West Canadice Corners – A hamlet west of Canadice hamlet.
