= Honeoye, New York =

Hamlet in New York, United States

Honeoye
- Hamlet & CDP
- Location of Honeoye in New York State
- Coordinates: 42°47′24″N 077°31′01″W
- Country: United States
- State: New York
- County: Ontario County
- Town: Town of Richmond

Area (2010 Census)
  - Total: 0.921 sq mi (2.39 km^{2})
  - Land: 0.921 sq mi (2.39 km^{2})
  - Water: 0.0 sq mi (0 km^{2})
- Elevation: 814 ft (248 m)

Population (2010)
  - Total: 579
  - Density: 628.7/sq mi (242.7/km^{2})
- Time zone: UTC−5 (EST)
  - Summer (DST): UTC−4 (EDT)
- ZIP code: 14471
- Area code: 585
- FIPS code: 36-35353
- GNIS feature ID: 953132
- Website: www.richmondny.gov

Honeoye (/ˈhʌniɔɪ/ HUN-ee-oy) is a hamlet in the Town of Richmond, in Ontario County, New York, United States. As of the 2020 census, Honeoye had a population of 723. The community is listed as a census-designated place (CDP).

It is located 33 miles (53 kilometers) south of downtown Rochester. The community is at the north end of Honeoye Lake, one of the minor Finger Lakes. It is primarily situated along U.S. Route 20A between Ontario County Roads 33 and 37. The center of the hamlet can roughly be placed at the intersection of Route 20A and Ontario County Road 36 (West Lake Road).

Due to its location at the northern tip of Honeoye Lake and seasonal recreational population, the hamlet contains several businesses, including gas stations and grocery, drug, liquor, hardware, auto-parts, and convenience stores. It also contains several restaurants, a doctor's office, dentist's office, and Honeoye Central School, which is K-12. There are also multiple churches, a fire station, public library, beach, park, state boat launch, and hiking trail.

== History ==
The name Honeoye is derived from the Seneca word ha-ne-a-yah, which means lying finger, or where the finger lies. The name comes from the local story of a Native American whose finger was bitten by a rattlesnake and who therefore cut off his finger with a tomahawk.

The area that is now the hamlet of Honeoye is thought to have first been inhabited by the Point Peninsula Indians more than 10,000 years ago. Following them came the Seneca, who settled their village at the northeast part of Honeoye Lake, just north of the present-day community of Honeoye Lake Park.

During the American Revolution, this Seneca village was destroyed by General John Sullivan in September 1779 as part of his campaign to eliminate the threat from the Iroquois, most of whose nations were allied with the British. At the site of the Indian village, Sullivan's troops built a small garrison known as Fort Cummings, named for the commanding officer left in charge. Here they left their "sick, lame and lazy" as well as a large portion of their supplies, so they could quickly enter the Genesee country to the west and drive the Seneca from the frontier.

After the war, some of these soldiers chose to return and resettle in western New York because of its fertile soil. Some land was paid as bounty to war veterans. Captain Peter Pitts was the first European-American to settle the area of present-day Honeoye, where he established Pittstown (now Richmond) in 1789.

In the mid-19th century, this area had numerous abolitionists, feminists, and other progressive activists. Stations of the Underground Railroad were founded in western New York to help convey escaped slaves to freedom in Canada. The Seneca Falls Convention for women's rights took place in the nearby town.

Honeoye remained a largely agricultural community until the early part of the 20th century, when many wealthy people from Rochester took interest in Honeoye Lake as a resort area. Its relatively shallow depth gave it warmer temperatures than the Great Lakes. In the 1920s the City of Rochester took interest in the lake as a source of municipal water and created some plans to flood Honeoye Valley behind a dam, but since the city already was getting water from Canadice and Hemlock lakes, this never took place. Since then, the area has remained popular for vacationers.

== Geography ==
The Hamlet of Honeoye lies just north of Honeoye Lake on Honeoye Creek and lies at the bottom of Honeoye Valley. Honeoye is located at 42°47′24″N 077°31′01″W (42.7900646, -77.5169374) and its elevation is 814 feet (248 m).

According to the 2010 United States census, the CDP has a total area of 0.921 square miles (2.39 km^{2}), all land.

=== Climate ===
The climate of Honeoye is typical of the northeastern United States, with four distinct seasons including warm, humid summers and cold snowy winters.

Climate data for Honeoye, New York (1991–2020 normals, extremes 1992–present
Month	Jan	Feb	Mar	Apr	May	Jun	Jul	Aug	Sep	Oct	Nov	Dec	Year
Record high °F (°C)	65 (18)	74 (23)	84 (29)	89 (32)	94 (34)	94 (34)	98 (37)	98 (37)	93 (34)	88 (31)	80 (27)	71 (22)	98 (37)
Mean daily maximum °F (°C)	33.1 (0.6)	35.3 (1.8)	43.4 (6.3)	56.6 (13.7)	69.3 (20.7)	77.0 (25.0)	80.7 (27.1)	79.6 (26.4)	73.2 (22.9)	61.0 (16.1)	49.1 (9.5)	38.4 (3.6)	58.1 (14.5)
Daily mean °F (°C)	24.4 (−4.2)	25.8 (−3.4)	33.1 (0.6)	45.1 (7.3)	57.1 (13.9)	65.4 (18.6)	69.4 (20.8)	68.1 (20.1)	61.4 (16.3)	50.5 (10.3)	40.2 (4.6)	30.7 (−0.7)	47.6 (8.7)
Mean daily minimum °F (°C)	15.7 (−9.1)	16.2 (−8.8)	22.8 (−5.1)	33.5 (0.8)	44.9 (7.2)	53.7 (12.1)	58.0 (14.4)	56.6 (13.7)	49.6 (9.8)	39.9 (4.4)	31.3 (−0.4)	23.0 (−5.0)	37.1 (2.8)
Record low °F (°C)	−28 (−33)	−19 (−28)	−22 (−30)	8 (−13)	23 (−5)	34 (1)	40 (4)	37 (3)	28 (−2)	19 (−7)	0 (−18)	−9 (−23)	−28 (−33)
Average precipitation inches (mm)	2.16 (55)	1.89 (48)	2.67 (68)	3.08 (78)	3.21 (82)	4.05 (103)	4.30 (109)	3.72 (94)	3.25 (83)	3.55 (90)	2.70 (69)	2.61 (66)	37.19 (945)
Average snowfall inches (cm)	13.4 (34)	13.8 (35)	11.9 (30)	1.7 (4.3)	0.0 (0.0)	0.0 (0.0)	0.0 (0.0)	0.0 (0.0)	0.0 (0.0)	0.1 (0.25)	4.6 (12)	9.3 (24)	54.8 (139)
Average precipitation days (≥ 0.01 in)	16.9	13.2	13.8	13.9	13.4	13.0	12.3	11.4	11.5	15.2	13.3	15.6	163.5
Average snowy days (≥ 0.1 in)	9.5	8.0	5.4	1.1	0.0	0.0	0.0	0.0	0.0	0.0	1.9	6.2	32.1
Source: NOAA

== Demographics ==
As a hamlet with no legally defined boundaries, there are no US Census Bureau demographic data specific to Honeoye. Generally, residents of the encompassing town of Richmond identify themselves with Honeoye, and so one could refer to the demographic data for the Town of Richmond. Richmond, NY Demographic Data

== Economy ==
The hamlet of Honeoye is home to several dozen small businesses that provide services to many surrounding towns and communities, including all or parts of Canadice, Bristol, South Bristol, and Livonia. Many of the businesses are members of the Honeoye Chamber of Commerce. Most of the businesses see their best business in the summer months, when population is increased by seasonal residents. Winter visitors also come to the area, for the exceptional ice fishing on Honeoye Lake and skiing and related activities at two local ski resorts: Bristol Mountain and Hunt Hollow. Cross-country skiers often visit Harriet Hollister-Spencer State Park in the southern part of Canadice and Ontario County Park in South Bristol.

While once thriving in such a small community, manufacturing in Honeoye downsized from five companies to two over the last 20 years or more, mainly due to the lack of rail access or a major highway. In March 2012, Stone Construction Equipment closed their doors, leaving only CY Plastics & Roome Technologies as the only manufacturers. The local economy is almost exclusively limited to agriculture provided by farms in the area and seasonal tourism generated by Honeoye Lake.

== Education ==
=== Public school ===
Honeoye and the surrounding area are included in the Honeoye Central School District. The district is served by one building providing schooling for all of the district's K-12 students. Enrollment at Honeoye Central is about 600 students. The school mascot is the bulldog and the colors are Royal blue and white, with red as an occasional accent color.

The French department maintains connections with Lycée Bréquigny in Rennes, France, which serves as a kind of sister school. The English Department in the French high school and the French department in Honeoye provide opportunities for students to travel and live in the opposite country, to experience the culture with a student and his or her family.

== Local sports ==
Honeoye Central School competes within the NYSPHAA Section V. Currently sports are classified in the D to CC range, depending on the sport. The school also competes in the Finger Lakes West League with strong traditional rivalries with neighboring schools Bloomfield and Naples.

In recent years Honeoye Sports have achieved success in girls volleyball with Section V championships in 2004, 2012, 2015 and 2016 and several Sectional final appearances, girls Soccer with a Section V championship in 2005 and several Sectional final appearances, boys Soccer with ten consecutive sectional appearances, recent league titles in 2004, 2008, 2009, a #1 Class C State-Ranking in 2009, and a Section V Class CC championship in 2008, 2015 and 2016. cross country with several runners competing in sectional and state competitions, and six consecutive Wayne Finger Lakes West League Titles, Golf, with several golfers competing in league and sectional competitions, and a streak of 56 straight team wins was snapped in early 2006, girls basketball with a section V championship in 2006, a NYSPHAA West Regional Championship in 2006 and a New York State Final Four appearance in 2006, indoor track with several athletes competing in sectional and state competitions, boys baseball with three consecutive sectional final appearances, 2008 Section V class CCC Championship, 2008 NYSPHAA West Regional Championship, and a New York State Final 4 appearance and girls softball with several sectional final appearances.

== Culture and recreation ==
Honeoye and the surrounding community are recognized mainly for the lake and its recreational value including water sports, fishing, and ice fishing. The steep valleys of the area also provide excellent snow skiing in the winter at two primary resorts: Bristol Mountain and Hunt Hollow. Honeoye is also located near the Finger Lakes wine viticultural area. Several parks also surround the area including: Sandy Bottom Beach and Nature Trail, Harriet Hollister-Spencer State Recreation Area, and Ontario County Park.

Honeoye was previously famous for its annual winter carnival beginning in 1961, but the carnival was discontinued after 1971 because the small community could not support the large number of patrons. In 2005, Honeoye brought back an annual event dubbed The Captain Red Beard's Feast in early September (usually Labor Day weekend.)

In the wintertime, the area is also a popular snowmobiling area, with over 100 miles of marked and partially groomed NYS Corridor snowmobile trails, connecting to the neighboring communities of Bloomfield, Hemlock, Naples, and Wayland.

Honeoye is often viewed as more of a community rather than just a hamlet. Many residents of the area often identify themselves with Honeoye before identifying with their own town.

== Media ==
Honeoye is served by Rochester, Syracuse, and Buffalo television and radio stations. It is also included in the coverage area of the Canandaigua Daily Messenger, Rochester's Democrat & Chronicle. Honeoye has also been served by a weekly newspaper, The Honeoye Herald/The Naples Record, though publication has since ceased.

== Notable people ==
- Helen Pitts Douglass - abolitionist, feminist, and second wife of Frederick Douglass
- Jeannette Klute - Kodak research photographer who demonstrated color photography as an art form
- Brian Kolb (R) - representative to the New York State Assembly, 129th District
- Tim Evanicki - author, college audition coach; writer of Bathhouse: The Musical!

== See also ==
- Finger Lakes AVA
