= Richmond, New York =

Richmond
- Town
- Location within the state of New York
- Coordinates: 42°48′N 77°32′W
- Country: United States
- State: New York
- County: Ontario
- Named after: Abigail Richmond Pitts

Government
  - Type: Town Council
  - Town Supervisor: Daryl Marshall (R)
  - Town Council: Members' List: • Stephen A Barnhoorn (R); • Devan Cornish (R); • Randy Deck (R); • Scott Flynn (R)

Area
  - Total: 44.39 sq mi (114.98 km^{2})
  - Land: 42.43 sq mi (109.90 km^{2})
  - Water: 1.96 sq mi (5.08 km^{2})
- Elevation: 833 ft (254 m)

Population (2020)
  - Total: 3,380 ▲
  - Estimate (2021): 3,368
  - Density: 77.4/sq mi (29.88/km^{2})
- Time zone: UTC-5 (Eastern (EST))
  - Summer (DST): UTC-4 (EDT)
- FIPS code: 36-61544
- GNIS feature ID: 0978648
- Website: Town website

Richmond is a town in Ontario County, New York, United States. The population was 3,380 at the 2020 census. The town is named after Abigail Richmond Pitts, an early settler. The town of Richmond is on the western border of the county, south of Rochester.

== History ==
Richmond was part of the Phelps and Gorham Purchase. The area was first settled around 1790. The town was established in 1796 as "Pittstown", after Captain Peter Pitts, and was renamed "Honeoye" in 1808. In 1815, the name was changed to "Richmond", after Peter Pitts' wife, Abigail Richmond Pitts, regarded as the town's "founding mother." More territory was added to Richmond from the Town of Canadice in 1836. Parts of the Towns of Bristol and South Bristol were added to Richmond in 1848, but were returned to their previous towns in 1852.

In 1600 the Honeoye Lake Watershed was—apart from clearings made by Native Americans and natural causes such as fire, steep slope landslides, wind or ice—completely forested. The watershed’s primeval forest contained massive trees, some covering as much as a half-acre of ground.

Early settlers found these forests useful. Probably the first product to be transported to market was barrels of potash, made from ashes of the burned trees. As sawmills were erected, lumber from the trees cut from 1830 to 1890 were used in the construction of urban centers such as Rochester, Buffalo, and Syracuse.

Efforts to bring logs down from the inaccessible area between East Lake Road and Gulick led to the construction of a rail line in the bottom of Briggs Gully. In 1885, maximum deforestation and agricultural land use arrived in New York State, often on lands that would not support these practices. Since 1885, there has been a slow decline of farming in the watershed, accelerated by the Great Depression from 1929 to 1943 and a gradual re-establishment of the area’s forests.

Changes in the character of the Town of Richmond and Honeoye Lake Watershed over the past half century have been significant. The growth in the use of private automobiles and the construction of good roads in the 1920s and 1930s added to the desirability of Honeoye lakefront cottages. By the mid-twentieth century, undeveloped lake frontage had mostly disappeared and summer cottages filled the shoreline.

The years after World War II also signaled the end of agriculture as a principal use of the watershed land and the rapid residential development in the hills of Richmond and Canadice overlooking the lake. The reduction of agriculture resulted in the natural re-forestation of inactive agricultural lands, which was beneficial in reducing erosion. However, increased residential development resulted in the loss of native vegetation and an increase in impermeable surfaces. These historical changes in the watershed have impacted the watershed character and the water quality— both for better and worse.

In 1962, the Honeoye Chamber of Commerce organized a first Winter Carnival. The event became so popular that in 1971 over 50,000 visitors arrived—tying up traffic for miles. After considerable success, the Winter Carnival was discontinued due to lack of tourist infrastructure. Recent studies by the Ontario County Tourism Bureau have documented the major economic benefits of special festivals and occasions to Ontario County communities. The summer population has been estimated at 4,500.

== Geography ==
According to the United States Census Bureau, the town has a total area of 44.3 square miles (115 km^{2}), of which 42.4 square miles (110 km^{2}) is land and 1.9 square miles (4.9 km^{2}) (4.29%) is water.

The western town line is the border of Livingston County. Most of Honeoye Lake, one of the minor Finger Lakes, is inside the town. Honeoye Creek, the lake's outlet, flows northward through the town.

US 20A crosses the town.

== Demographics ==
Historical population
Census	Pop.	Note	%±
1820	2,765		—
1830	1,876		−32.2%
1840	1,937		3.3%
1850	1,852		−4.4%
1860	1,650		−10.9%
1870	1,622		−1.7%
1880	1,772		9.2%
1890	1,511		−14.7%
1900	1,381		−8.6%
1910	1,277		−7.5%
1920	1,071		−16.1%
1930	883		−17.6%
1940	897		1.6%
1950	959		6.9%
1960	1,384		44.3%
1970	1,925		39.1%
1980	2,703		40.4%
1990	3,230		19.5%
2000	3,452		6.9%
2010	3,361		−2.6%
2020	3,380		0.6%
2021 (est.)	3,368		−0.4%
U.S. Decennial Census

As of the US Census of 2010, Richmond has 3,361 people, 1,421 households, and 968 families residing in the town. There were 1,956 housing units. The racial makeup of the town was 98.19% White, 0.2% African American, 0.8% Native American, 0.6% Asian, and 1.0% from two or more races. Hispanic or Latino of any race were 0.8% of the population.

There were 1,421 households, out of which 23.1% had children under the age of 18 living with them, 56% were married couples living together, 8% had a female householder with no husband present, and 31.9% were non-families. 25.9% of all households were made up of individuals. The average household size was 2.37 and the average family size was 2.81.

In the town, the population was spread out, with 21.1% under the age of 19, 6.5% from 18 to 24, 20.3% from 25 to 44, 38.1% from 45 to 64, and 15.6% who were 65 years of age or older. The median age was 47.3 years.

The median income for a household in the town was $54,426, and the median income for a family was $62,039. The per capita income for the town was $27,887.

== Government ==
Richmond operates under a typical New York State municipal government. It has a legislative branch of five town council members, one being the town supervisor, and a judicial branch consisting of two justices. The center of all town government functions is at the Richmond town hall. The town hall is located on 8690 Main St. (US Route 20A) in the hamlet of Honeoye.

Each town council member is elected to serve a four-year term, with the exception of the town supervisor who serves a two-year term.

== Communities and locations in Richmond ==
- Allens Hill – A hamlet in the northeast part of the town on County Road 40 (Allens Hill Road). It is named after early settlers of the Allen family who arrived around 1797.
- Curtis Corner – A hamlet in the western part of the town on US-20A.
- Denison Corner – A hamlet in the northwest part of the town.
- Frost Hollow – A hamlet in the northwest part of the town.
- Honeoye – A hamlet north of Honeoye Lake on US-20A and Honeoye Creek.
- Honeoye Creek Wildlife Management Area – A conservation area in the northwest of the town.
- Honeoye Park – A hamlet on the east side of Honeoye Lake.
- Richmond Center – A hamlet north of Honeoye, near the center of the town on County Road 37.
- Richmond Mills – A location near Denison Corner in the northwestern part of the town.
- Willow Beach – A hamlet south of Honeoye Park on the east shore of Honeoye Lake.
