= Honeoye Creek =

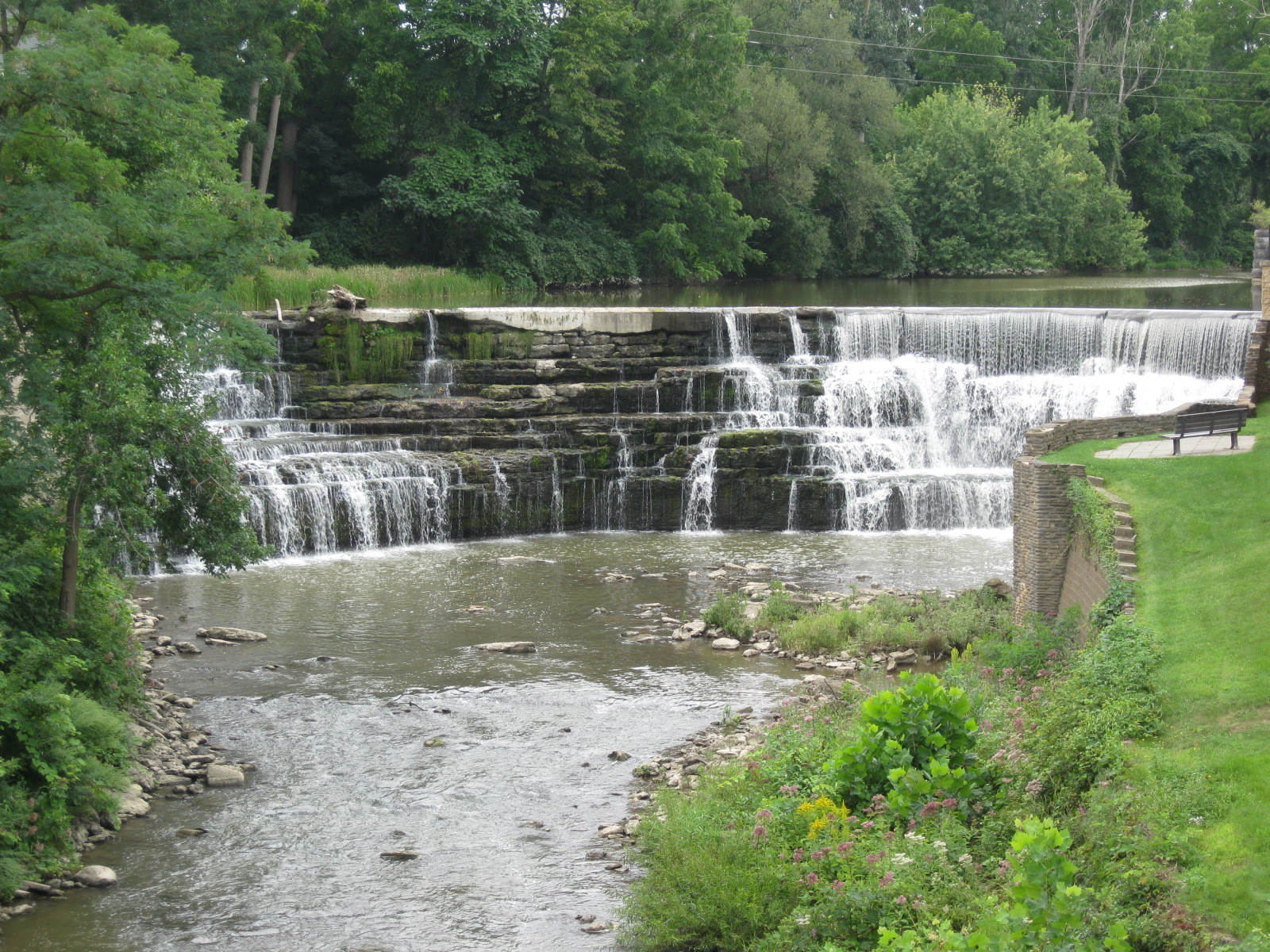
- Honeoye Creek at Honeoye Falls

- Location of the mouth of the Honeoye Creek in New York State. Honeoye Creek (the United States)

Location
- Country: United States
- State: New York

Physical characteristics
- Source: Honeoye Lake
  - location: Richmond, Ontario County
  - coordinates: 42°46′59″N 77°30′45″W
- Mouth: Genesee River
  - location: Avon, Livingston County
  - coordinates: 42°58′16″N 77°43′07″W
- Discharge
  - location: Honeoye Falls
  - minimum: 0 cu ft/s (0 m^{3}/s) (August 12, 2001)
  - maximum: 3,820 cu ft/s (108 m^{3}/s) (April 2, 1993)

Honeoye Creek (/ˈhʌniɔɪ/ HUN-ee-oy) is a tributary of the Genesee River in western New York in the United States. The name Honeoye is from the Seneca word ha-ne-a-yah, which translates to "lying finger", or "where the finger lies". The name refers to the local story of a Native American who had his finger bitten by a rattlesnake and therefore cut off his finger with a tomahawk.

== Course ==
Honeoye Creek emerges from the north end of Honeoye Lake, one of the Finger Lakes, in the town of Richmond, Ontario County. The hamlet of Honeoye within Richmond is located on the creek where it passes under US Route 20A.

As Honeoye Creek flows northward, it is joined by the Hemlock Outlet Creek and then becomes the border between Ontario County and Livingston County. The stream flows into Monroe County, passing the village of Honeoye Falls in Mendon, where it flows over a waterfall. Honeoye Creek then continues in a westerly direction and enters the Genesee River in West Rush, near Avon.

== See also ==
- List of rivers in New York
