= Honeoye Lake =

Lake in New York, United States

- Haneayah (Seneca)
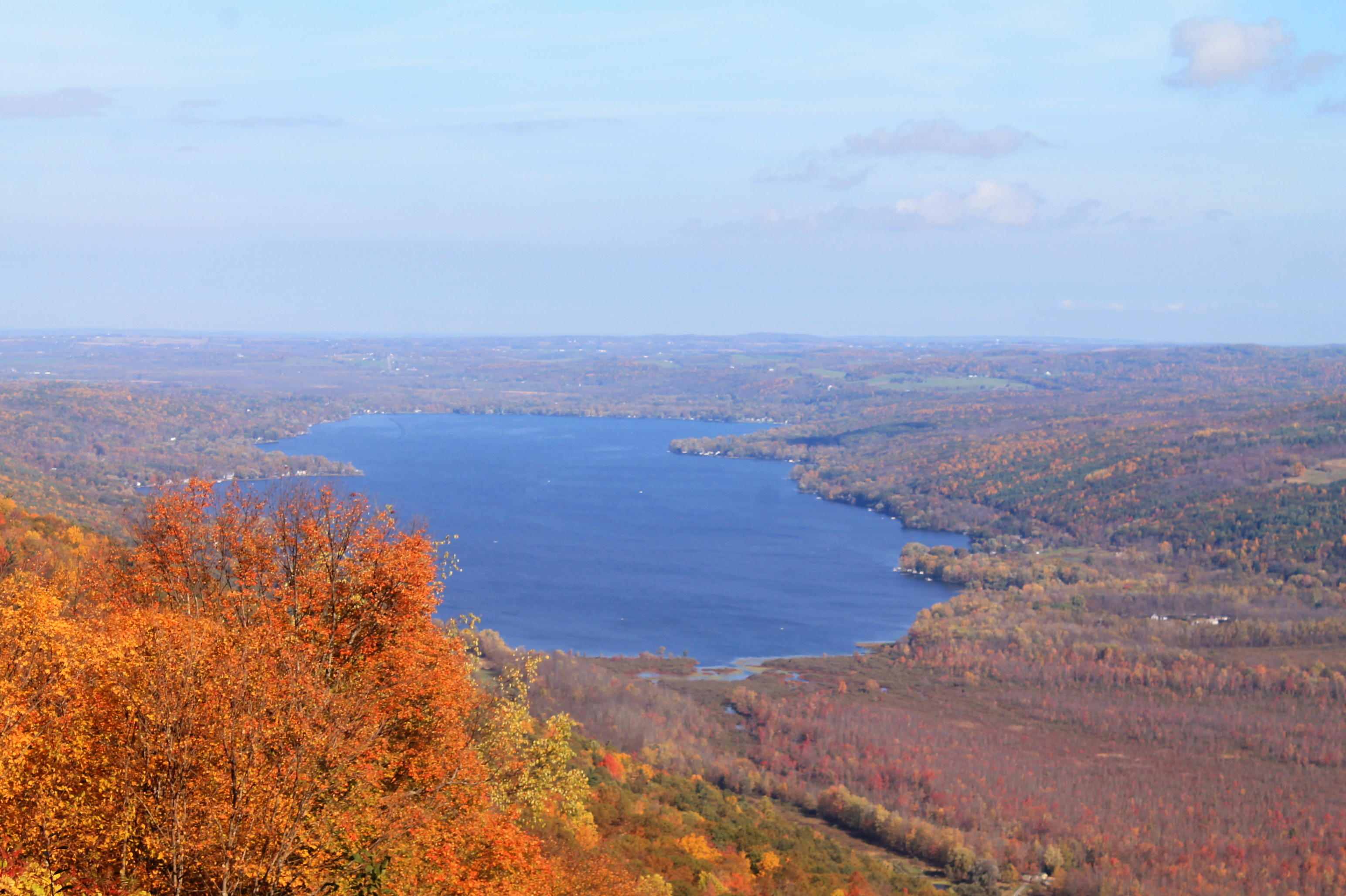
- Honeoye Lake as viewed from the Harriet Hollister Spencer State Recreation Area, October 2013.

- Location within New York Honeoye Lake (the United States)
- Location: Ontario County, New York
- Group: Finger Lakes
- Coordinates: 42°45′N 77°30.7′W
- Type: Ground moraine
- Primary inflows: Honeoye Inlet, Bray Gully, Briggs Gully
- Primary outflows: Honeoye Creek
- Catchment area: 36.7 sq mi (95 km^{2})
- Basin countries: United States
- Max. length: 4.5 mi (7.2 km)
- Max. width: 0.8 mi (1.3 km)
- Surface area: 1,772 acres (717 ha)
- Average depth: 16 ft (4.9 m)
- Max. depth: 30 ft (9.1 m)
- Water volume: .0086 cu mi (0.036 km^{3})
- Shore length^{1}: 9.6 miles (15.4 km)
- Surface elevation: 804 ft (245 m)
- Settlements: Honeoye, Richmond, Canadice
- References: World Lakes Database; NYFalls.com; USGS
- ^{1} Shore length is not a well-defined measure.

The eleven Finger Lakes of New York State.

Honeoye Lake (/ˈhʌniɔɪ/ HUN-ee-oy) is a Finger Lake in Ontario County in western New York state. It is the third largest of the four Finger Lakes in the county, and second smallest in all. Most of the lake is within the town of Richmond but a smaller southwestern part is in the town of Canadice. The hamlet of Honeoye is just north of the lake.

The name Honeoye comes from the Seneca word ha-ne-a-yah, which means lying finger, or where the finger lies. The name comes from the local story of a Native American whose finger was bitten by a rattlesnake and who therefore cut off his finger with a tomahawk.

== Description ==
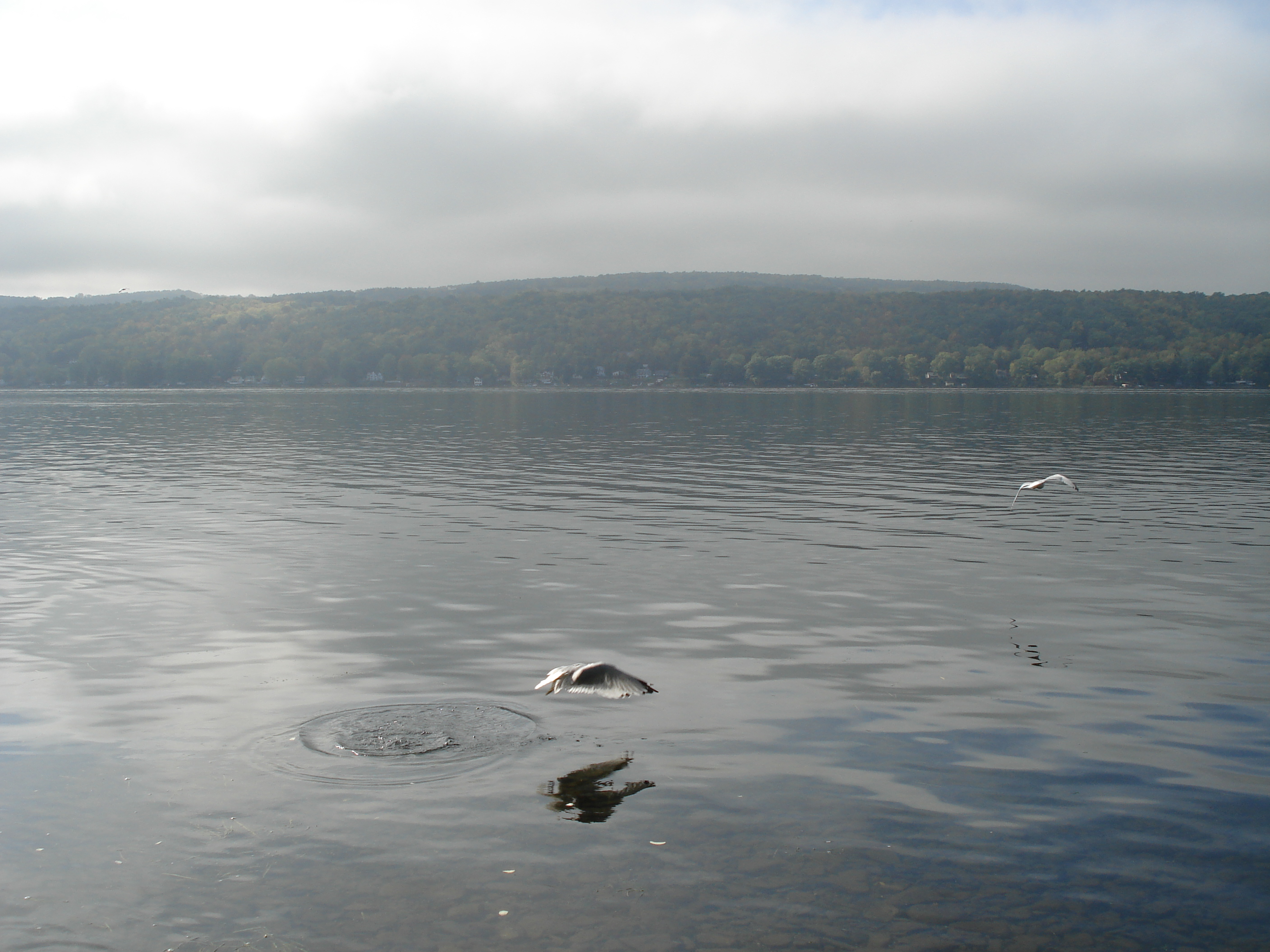
Ring-billed gulls taking off from Honeoye Lake

Honeoye Lake is the second smallest of the Finger Lakes and is located to the west of the major lakes. To its west are other minor Finger Lakes: Canadice Lake, Hemlock Lake, and Conesus Lake. As with the other Finger Lakes, Honeoye Lake was created by the advance and subsequent melting of continental glaciation.

The lake's surface is 804 feet (245 m) above sea level. The lake is long and narrow with a roughly north-south orientation, and a surface area of 1,772 acres (7.17 km^{2}). It is also relatively shallow and warmer than the other Finger Lakes. Its outlet is Honeoye Creek, which flows northward. A major feeder stream, called Honeoye Inlet, enters the lake at the south end.

The hamlet of Honeoye in the town of Richmond is located at its northern end. The Honeoye Lake Park Association administers a large tract of summer cottages and year-round dwellings known as the Times-Union Tract just south of the hamlet on the east side of the lake.

== Recreation ==
The shore of the lake has a high density of recreation homes, many with docks for boats and other recreation vehicles. In warmer weather, fishing is considered exceptional in Honeoye Lake. Walleye, bass, perch and bluegill are some of the recreational and tournament fish that can be found. Popular recreational activities also include boating, tubing, water skiing, wake boarding, and other water sports.

The Ring of Fire tradition is annually celebrated Labor Day weekend by area residents. Flares are lit around the lakeshore to signify summer's end and to recognize the wealth of the Finger Lakes harvest. In the winter, the water freezes quickly and maintains its solid surface throughout the season, at which time the lake is used for ice fishing, skating, and ice boating.

=== Public places ===
On the north end of the lake is Sandy Bottom Park, which includes a life guarded beach, two playgrounds, and multiple pavilions. There is also a boat launch that is available from May 15 to Labor Day.

Honeoye Lake Boat Launch State Park is available on the east side, towards the south end of the lake, and is open from May to November. Harriet Hollister Spencer State Recreation Area, located on Canadice Hill south of the lake, overlooks Honeoye Lake.

== Environmental Issues ==
In recent years the lake has suffered from water quality problems including shoreline erosion due to boating and blue-green algae blooms.
