= Hemlock Lake =

Lake in Livingston County, New York, USA

- Onehda Tecarneodi (Seneca)
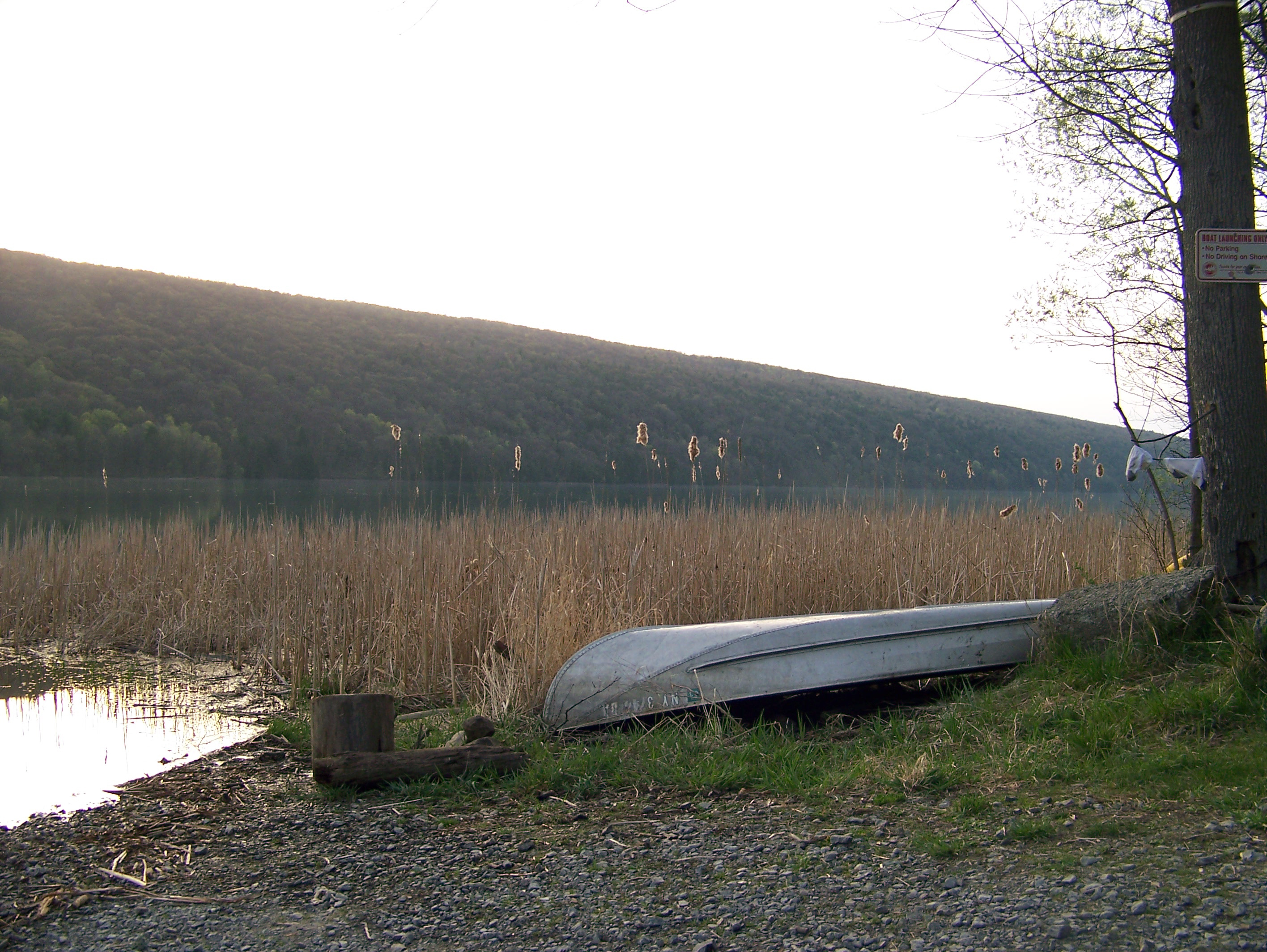
- View north from boat launch in the evening.

- Location of Hemlock Lake within New York. Hemlock Lake (the United States)
- Location: Livingston and Ontario counties, New York, United States
- Group: Finger Lakes
- Coordinates: 42°43′07″N 77°36′32″W
- Type: Ground moraine
- Primary inflows: Spring Water Creek, Lime Kiln Creek, Reynolds Gully
- Primary outflows: Hemlock Outlet
- Basin countries: United States
- Max. length: 7 mi (11 km)
- Max. width: 0.5 mi (0.80 km)
- Surface area: 1,800 acres (730 ha)
- Average depth: 45 ft (14 m)
- Max. depth: 91 ft (28 m)
- Water volume: .024 cu mi (0.10 km^{3})
- Surface elevation: 906 ft (276 m)

The eleven Finger Lakes of New York State.

Hemlock Lake is a Finger Lake in Ontario County in western New York state. The third smallest of eleven, it is mostly located in Livingston County, New York, south of Rochester, with a portion overlapping into Ontario County. Hemlock is a translation of the Seneca name for the lake, O-neh-da Te-car-ne-o-di. It is one of two Finger Lakes whose shorelines are virtually undeveloped.

== Description ==
Hemlock Lake is seven miles (11 km) long, and approximately 0.5 miles (0.80 km) wide along most of its uniform north-south length. It has a surface area of 1,800 acres (7 km^{2}), and maximum and mean depths of 91 feet (28 m) and 45 feet (14 m) respectively. Because the lake is a water source to Rochester, shore development is restricted and boats can be no longer than 17 feet and outboard motors no larger than 10 horsepower. Swimming is not permitted in the lake.

A feature of the lake is its land-locked salmon. In addition, the lake contains rainbow trout, brown trout, lake trout, smallmouth bass, largemouth bass, rock bass, chain pickerel, brown bullhead, yellow perch, walleye, and black crappie.

== History ==
The Seneca people used the lake and its surrounding area for hunting and fishing near the south end of the lake up until the late 1770s. In September 1779 General John Sullivan and his army drove the natives away from the lake as part of the Sullivan Expedition.

The first white settlers arrived in the 1790s. Most of these settlers were involved in the lumber industry and built their homes out of wooden slabs by the outlet at the north end of the lake. For a time this place was known as "Slab City". The lake was used to float logs to Slab City in the summer months as well as to haul logs on the ice in the winter time.

Over the years Hemlock Lake became populated with over one hundred cottages and five hotels. Five large boats sailed the lake in the 1800s, including its first steam boat "The Seth Green". The lake was a popular summer vacation destination for the wealthy, many of whom came from Rochester.

In 1852 the City of Rochester approved the construction of a 16-mile (26 km) gravity fed pipeline after a severe outbreak of illness caused by contaminated city water, which opened in 1876. To improve water quality, the city purchased the land surrounding both Hemlock Lake and neighboring Canadice Lake; the lakes' cottages, hotels, and farms were condemned and torn down beginning in 1895. Property owners who refused to sell to the city became the subject of eminent domain. Including the land around Hemlock and Canadice lakes, the city owned over 5,000 acres (20 km^{2}) of land, of which 3,900 acres (16 km^{2}) were forested.

In 2010 the New York State Department of Environmental Conservation (DEC) purchased both Hemlock and Canadice Lakes from the City of Rochester for $13.7 million. The State has pledged to keep the lakes forever wild. Public access to the lake is permitted and encouraged, however boats are restricted to 17 feet (5.2 m) in length and outboard motors must be 10 horse-power or less.
