= Finger Lakes =

Group of lakes in New York, United States

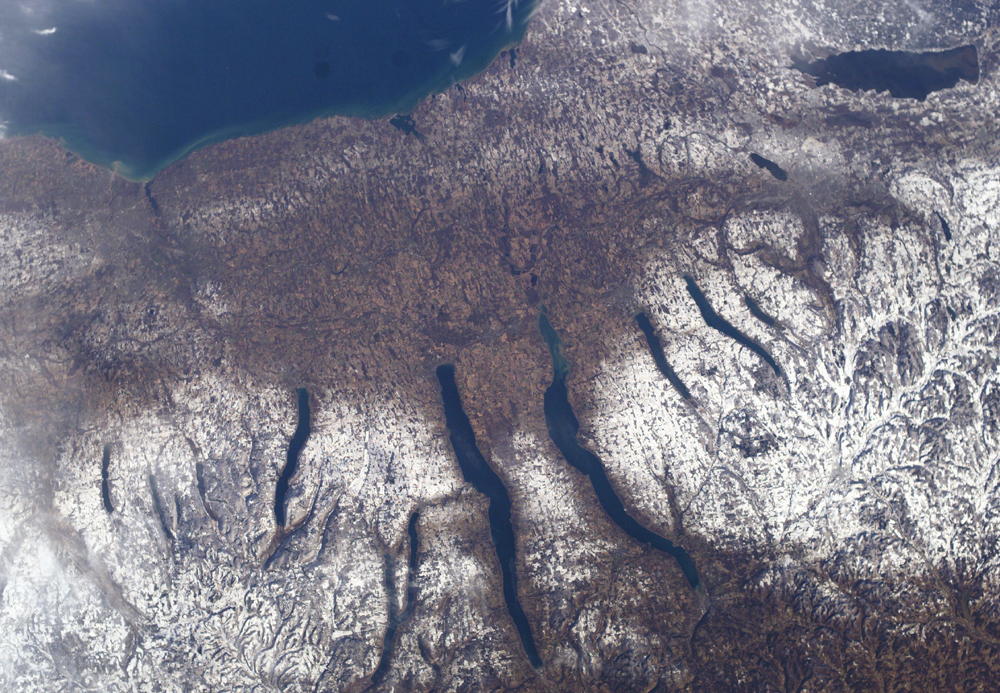
- Satellite view of the Finger Lakes region in late fall. Lake Ontario can be seen at the top left.
- Interactive map of Finger Lakes
- Location: New York
- Coordinates: 42°40′N 76°50′W
- Type: Finger lakes
- Part of: Lake Ontario Basin
- Primary outflows: Oswego River
- Basin countries: United States
- Settlements: Ithaca, Geneva, Canandaigua

The eleven Finger Lakes of New York State.

The Finger Lakes are a group of eleven long, narrow, roughly north–south lakes located in an area called the Finger Lakes region in New York State, in the United States. This region straddles the northern and transitional edge of the Northern Allegheny Plateau, known as the Finger Lakes Uplands and Gorges ecoregion, and the Ontario Lowlands ecoregion of the Great Lakes Lowlands.

The geological term finger lake refers to a long, narrow lake in an overdeepened glacial valley, while the proper name Finger Lakes goes back to the late 19th century. Cayuga and Seneca Lakes are among the deepest in the United States, measuring 435 and 618 feet (133 and 188 m), respectively, with bottoms well below sea level. Though none of the lakes' widths exceed 3.5 miles (5.6 km), Seneca Lake is 38.1 miles (61.3 km) long, and at 66.9 square miles (173 km^{2}) is the largest in total area.

== Name ==
The origin of the name Finger Lakes is uncertain. Currently, the oldest known published use of finger lakes for this group of 11 lakes is in a United States Geological Survey paper by Thomas Chamberlin that was published in 1883. This paper was later cited and Finger Lakes formally used as a proper name by R. S. Tarr in a Geological Society of America paper published in 1893. Older usage of Finger Lakes in either maps, papers, reports, or any other documents remains to be verified.

== Lakes ==
The eleven Finger Lakes, from west to east, are:

Summary
Name	Elevation	Area	Length	Maximum width	Maximum depth	Location	Settlements
Conesus Lake	818 feet (249 m)	3,420 acres (1,380 ha)	8 miles (13 km)	1 mile (1.6 km)	66 feet (20 m)	Livingston County: Conesus, Geneseo, Groveland, Livonia	Lakeville
Hemlock Lake	905 feet (276 m)	1,800 acres (730 ha)	7 miles (11 km)	0.5 miles (0.80 km)	91 feet (28 m)	Livingston County: Conesus, Livonia, Springwater; Ontario County: Canadice, Richmond	
Canadice Lake	1,096 feet (334 m)	649 acres (263 ha)	3 miles (4.8 km)	0.3 miles (0.48 km)	95 feet (29 m)	Ontario County: Canadice	
Honeoye Lake	804 feet (245 m)	1,772 acres (717 ha)	4.5 miles (7.2 km)	0.8 miles (1.3 km)	30 feet (9.1 m)	Ontario County: Canadice, Richmond	Honeoye
Canandaigua Lake	688 feet (210 m)	10,558 acres (4,273 ha)	15.5 miles (24.9 km)	1.5 miles (2.4 km)	276 feet (84 m)	Ontario County: Canandaigua, Gorham, South Bristol; Yates County: Italy, Middlesex	Canandaigua, Woodville
Keuka Lake	715 feet (218 m)	11,584 acres (4,688 ha)	19.6 miles (31.5 km)	1.9 miles (3.1 km)	183 feet (56 m)	Steuben County: Pulteney, Urbana, Wayne; Yates County: Barrington, Jerusalem, Milo	Branchport, Hammondsport, Penn Yan
Seneca Lake	445 feet (136 m)	43,343 acres (17,540 ha)	38 miles (61 km)	approx 3 miles (5 km)	618 feet (188 m)	Ontario County: Geneva; Schuyler County: Dix, Hector, Reading; Seneca County: Fayette, Lodi, Ovid, Romulus, Varick, Waterloo; Yates County: Benton, Milo, Starkey, Torrey	Dresden, Geneva, Watkins Glen
Cayuga Lake	381 feet (116 m)	42,956 acres (17,384 ha)	38 miles (61 km)	3.5 miles (5.6 km)	435 feet (133 m)	Cayuga County: Aurelius, Genoa, Ledyard, Springport; Seneca County: Covert, Fayette, Ovid, Romulus, Seneca Falls, Varick; Tompkins County: Ithaca, Lansing, Ulysses	Aurora, Ithaca, Lansing
Owasco Lake	712 feet (217 m)	6,665 acres (2,697 ha)	11.1 miles (17.9 km)	1.3 miles (2.1 km)	177 feet (54 m)	Cayuga County: Fleming, Moravia, Niles, Owasco, Scipio, Venice	Auburn
Skaneateles Lake	863 feet (263 m)	8,960 acres (3,630 ha)	16 miles (26 km)	1.5 miles (2.4 km)	300 feet (91 m)	Cayuga County: Niles, Sempronius; Cortland County: Scott; Onondaga County: Skaneateles, Spafford	Skaneateles
Otisco Lake	787 feet (240 m)	1,877 acres (760 ha)	5.4 miles (8.7 km)	0.75 miles (1.21 km)	76 feet (23 m)	Onondaga County: Marcellus, Spafford	

Seneca, Cayuga, Skaneateles, Owasco, Keuka, and Canandaigua are considered the major Finger Lakes, while Conesus, Hemlock, Canadice, Honeoye, and Otisco are considered the minor Finger Lakes.

Numerous nearby lakes have been excluded from the traditional list of the lakes. All eleven are part of the Lake Ontario drainage basin. Waneta and Lamoka lakes, located southeast of Keuka Lake, are sometimes called the "fingernail" lakes, but are part of the Susquehanna River basin, draining into a tributary of the Chemung River. Silver Lake, which has the same geological characteristics as the Finger Lakes and is sometimes regarded as the "12th" Finger Lake, has traditionally been excluded due to its distance from the others, west of the Genesee River. Onondaga Lake and Cazenovia Lake to the east have similarly been excluded. Oneida Lake, to the northeast of Syracuse, is sometimes included as the "thumb", although it is shallow and somewhat different in character from the rest.

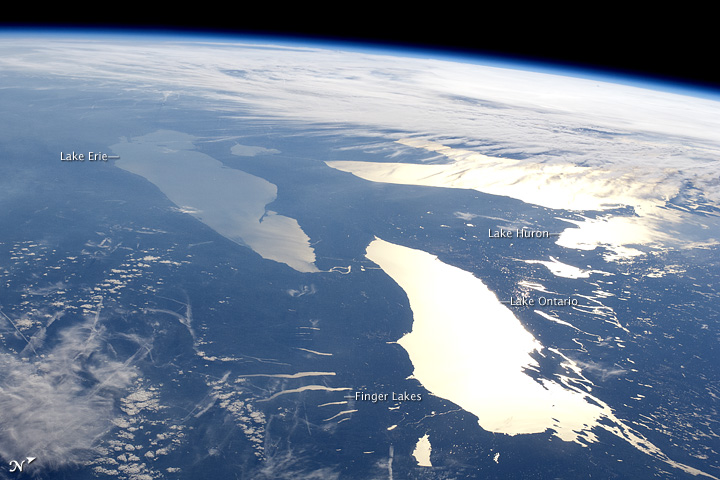
The Finger Lakes are in the center bottom of this west facing image; Lake Erie (upper left), Lake Huron (upper right), and Lake Ontario (lower right) are three of the Great Lakes

== Quaternary geology ==
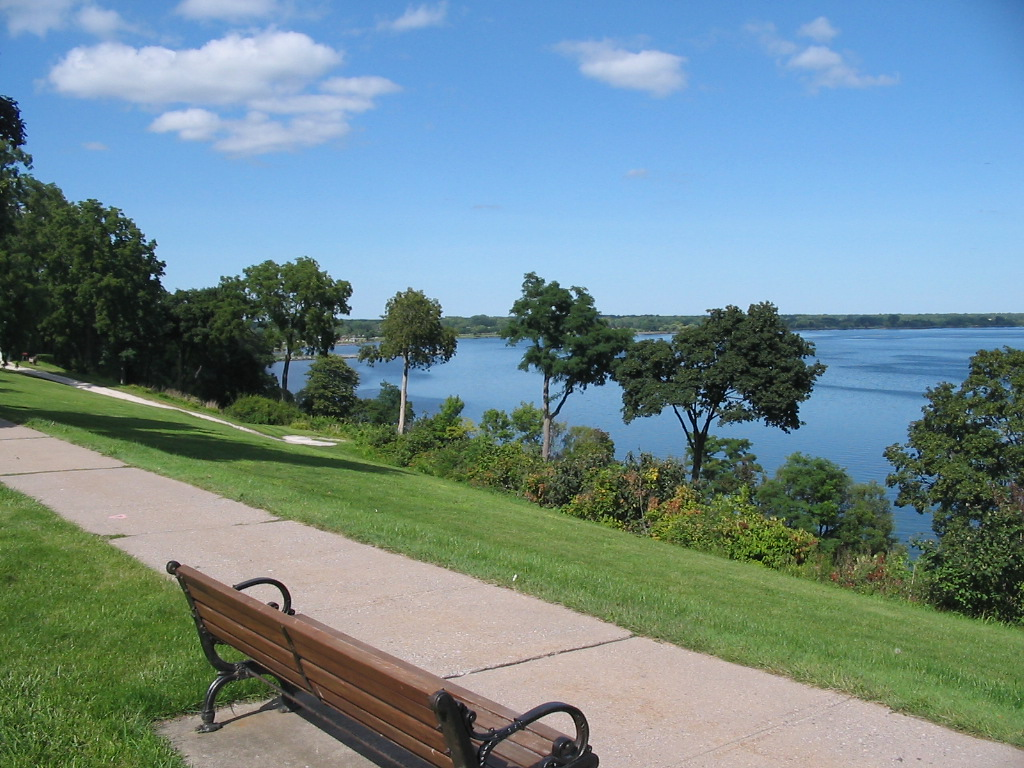
Seneca Lake, from South Main Street in Geneva, New York.

These glacial finger lakes originated as a series of northward-flowing streams. Around two million years ago, the area was glaciated by the first of many continental glaciers as the Laurentide Ice Sheet moved southward from the Hudson Bay area. During the glacial maximums, subglacial meltwater and glacial ice widened, deepened, and accentuated the existing river valleys to form subglacial tunnel valleys. Glacial debris, possibly terminal moraine left behind by the receding ice, acted as dams, allowing lakes to form. Despite the deep erosion of the valleys, the surrounding uplands show little evidence of glaciation, suggesting the ice was thin, or at least unable to cause much erosion at higher elevations. The deep cutting by glacial erosion left some tributaries hanging high above the lakes—both Seneca and Cayuga have tributaries hanging as much as 120 m (390 ft) above the valley floors. Based on sediment cores, seismic stratigraphy, and radiocarbon dates, the finger lakes became ice-free about 14,400 BP calendar. At this time scouring by ice and meltwater ceased and these lakes filled initially with proglacial lake rhythmites. The deposition of proglacial lake rhythmites occurred between 14,400 and 13,900 BP calendar. After the margins of the Laurentide Ice Sheet retreated into the Ontario lowlands after 13,900 BP calendar, the accumulation, at first, of massive gray clays followed by dark gray to black, laminated, organic-rich muds, accumulated without interruption until present within the Finger Lakes.

Detailed studies of Marine Isotope Stage 3 and 4 age sediments exposed at a locality called the Great Gully on the eastern flank of the Cayuga Lake, near Union Springs, New York, record the presence of a paleolake that existed prior to Cayuga Lake. This paleolake, which is called Glacial Lake Nanette, was a proglacial lake that filled the bedrock valley currently occupied by Cayuga Lake from about 50,000 BP (calibrated) until it was overridden by a glacial readvance that occurred prior to 30,000 BP (calibrated) and buried it beneath younger glacial till. This research shows that bedrock valleys, in which the Finger lakes lie, existed prior to the Last Glacial Maximum and developed over multiple glaciations.

Finally, although sub-glacial scour during the Last Glacial Maximum removed the majority of pre-existing sediment down to the bedrock bottoms of the Finger Lakes, patches of interglacial deposits are likely preserved locally within or near hanging valleys on the margins of their valleys. For example, the principal site that has been well-studied is the Fembank exposure of interglacial deposits on the west margin of Cayuga. This deposit provides direct evidence that some version of Cayuga Lake and its bedrock valley existed prior to Last Glacial Maximum.

== Ecological concerns ==
Much of the Finger Lakes area lies upon the Marcellus Shale and the Utica Shale, two prominent natural gas reserves. Due to the recent increase in fracking technology, the natural gas is now accessible for extraction. While some large landowners have leased their lands, and a number of small landowners would like to follow suit, many residents of the Finger Lakes oppose the fracking process due to concerns about groundwater contamination and the industrial impact of the extraction-related activities. The first direct actions and local legislative actions against fracking occurred in the Finger Lakes bioregion. In December 2014, the government of New York banned all fracking in the state, citing pollution risks.

Trash from New York City is also sent to landfills in the area.

Since 2017, all of the Finger Lakes have experienced at least one outbreak of toxic algae, and for most of the lakes it has become an annual occurrence.

== History ==
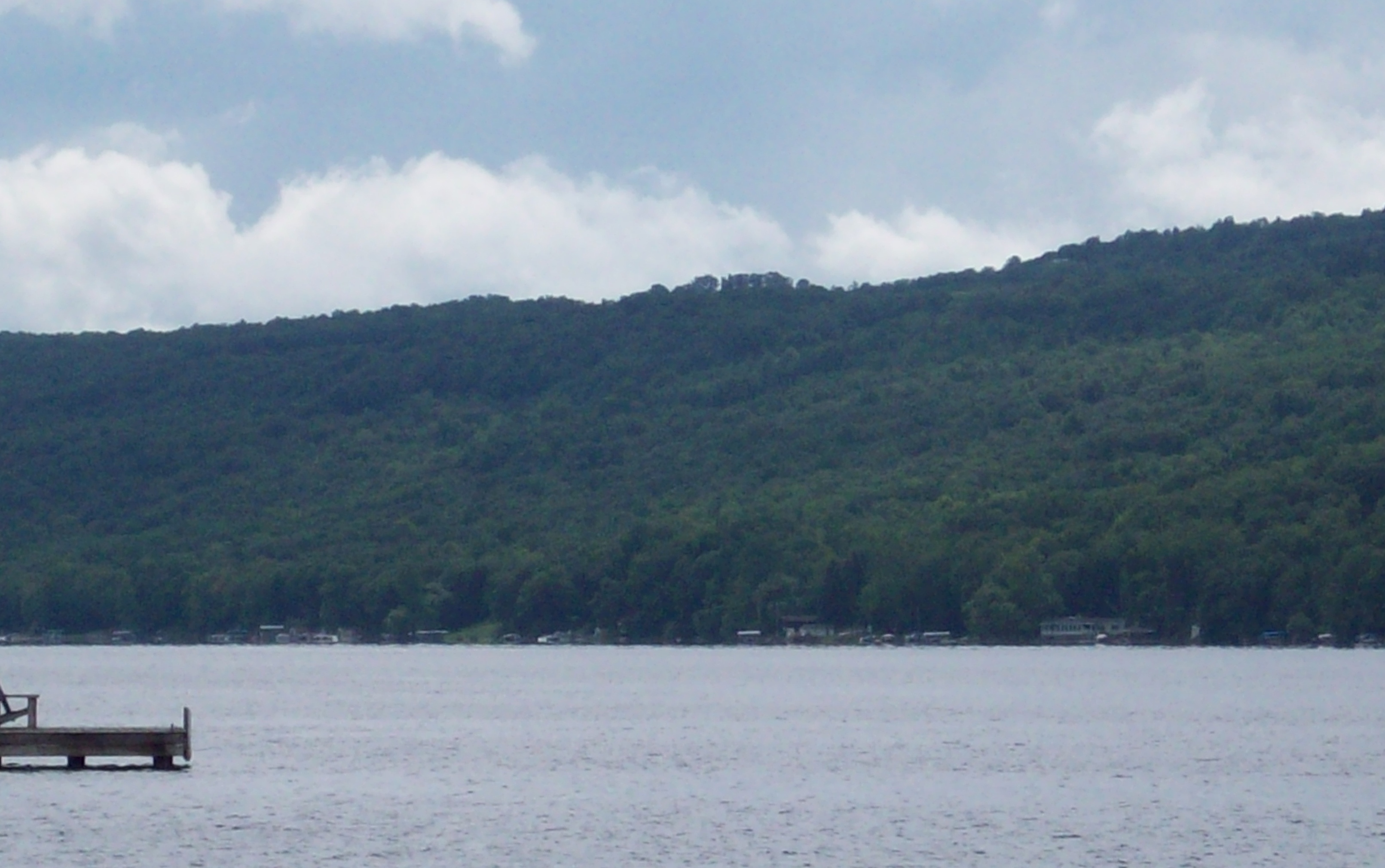
Bluff Point on Keuka Lake

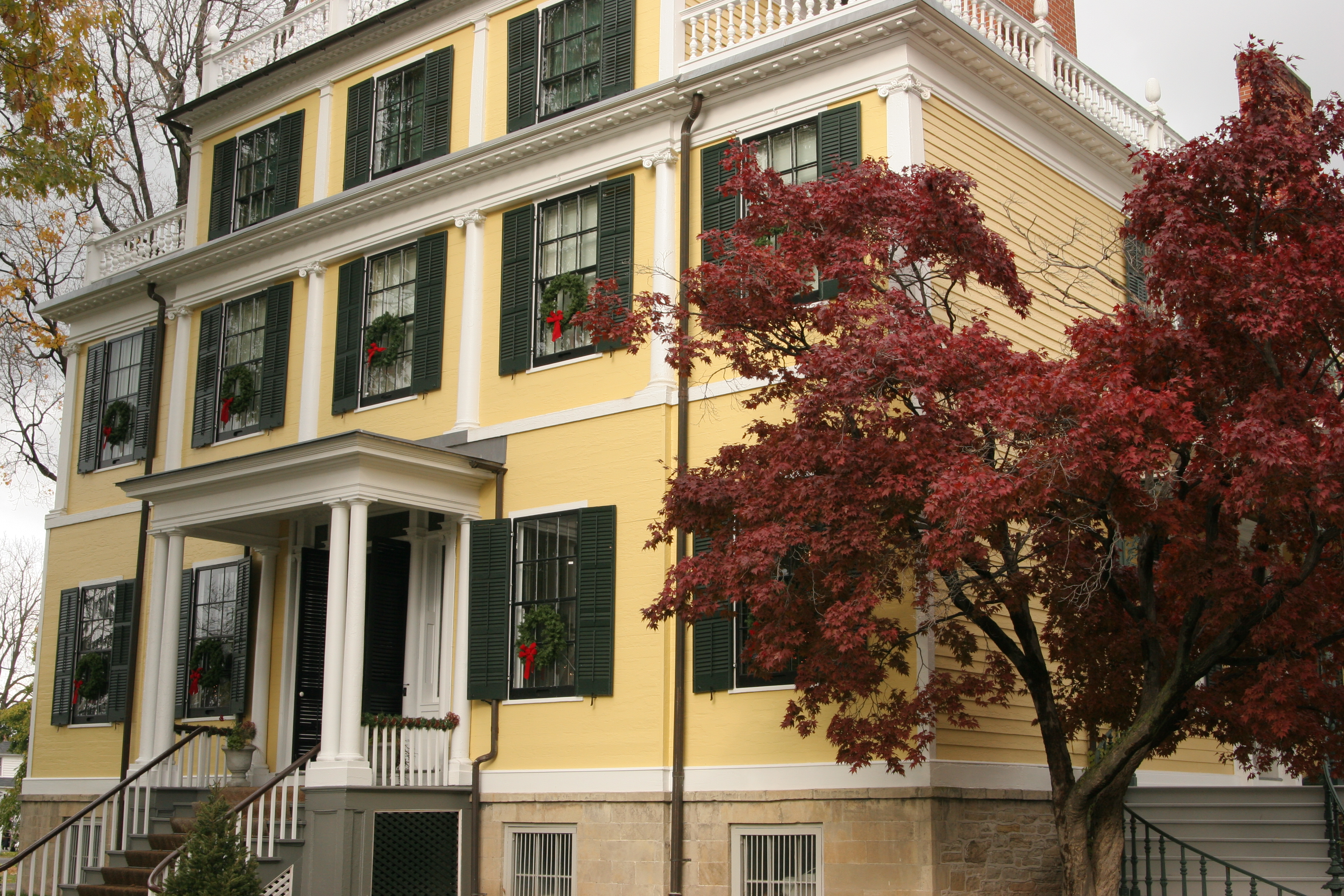
Granger Homestead, Canandaigua

The Finger Lakes region is a central part of the Haudenosaunee (Iroquois) homeland. The Haudenosaunee nations include the Seneca and Cayuga nations, for which the two largest Finger Lakes are named. The Tuscarora lived in the Finger Lakes region as well, from ca. 1720. The Onondaga and Oneida nations lived at the eastern edge of the region, closer to their namesake lakes, Oneida Lake and Onondaga Lake. The easternmost Haudenosaunee nation was the Mohawk.

The Finger Lakes region contains sites of unknown cultural affiliation and age. The Bluff Point Stoneworks is one such site as its age and who may have constructed these enigmatic stone structures has not been determined.

During colonial times, many other tribes moved to the Finger Lakes region, seeking the protection of the Haudenosaunee. For example, in 1753, the Tutelo moved to the town of Coreorgonel at the south end of Cayuga Lake near present-day Ithaca and lived there until 1779, when their village was destroyed by the Sullivan Expedition.

Haudenosaunee towns in the Finger Lakes region included the Seneca town of Gen-nis-he-yo (present-day Geneseo), Kanadaseaga (Seneca Castle, near present-day Geneva), Goiogouen (Cayuga Castle, east of Cayuga Lake), Chonodote (Cayuga town, present-day Aurora), Catherine's Town (near present-day Watkins Glen) and Ganondagan in Victor, New York.

The Haudenosaunee were able to prevent European colonization of the Finger Lakes region for nearly two centuries after first contact, often playing the French off against the British interests in savvy demonstrations of political competence. The adaptability of the Haudenosaunee people were key tools of resistance against hostile European powers rapidly spreading throughout North America, eager to dominate and increasingly brutal toward Native Americans in the Finger Lakes and beyond.

By the late 18th century, with the French governmental influence gone from Canada, Haudenosaunee power had weakened relative to the steady growth in European-Americans' populations, and internal strife eroded the political unity of the Haudenosaunee Confederacy as it faced pressures from colonists itching to move west and a desire to keep them out of Amerindian lands. During the American Revolutionary War, some Haudenosaunee sided with the British and some with the Americans, resulting in civil war among the Haudenosaunee. In the late 1770s, British-allied Haudenosaunee attacked various American frontier settlements, prompting counter-attacks, culminating in the Sullivan Expedition of 1779, which destroyed most of the Haudenosaunee towns and effectively broke Haudenosaunee power. After the Revolutionary War, the Haudenosaunee and other Indians of the region were assigned reservations. Most of their land, including the Finger Lakes region, was opened up to purchase and settlement.

Roughly the western half of the Finger Lakes region comprised the Phelps and Gorham Purchase of 1790. The region was rapidly settled at the turn of the 19th century, largely by a westward migration from New England, and to a lesser degree by northward influx from Pennsylvania. The regional architecture reflects these area traditions of the Federal and Greek Revival periods.

== Notable places ==
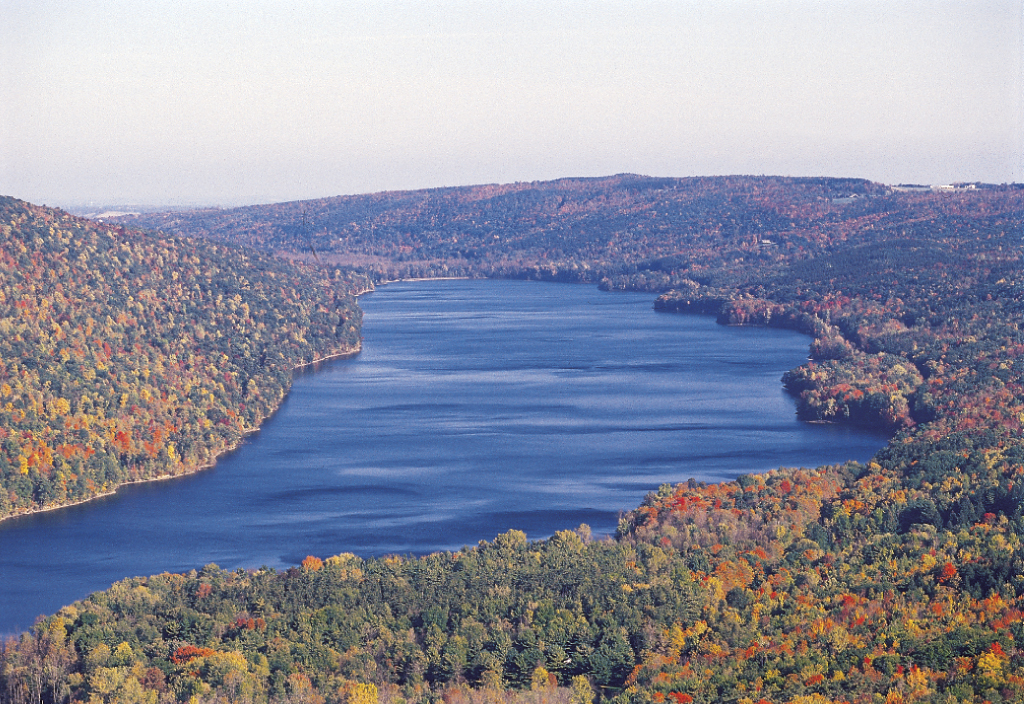
Canadice Lake is surrounded by the Hemlock–Canadice State Forest.

The Finger Lakes region, together with the Genesee Country of Western New York, has been referred to as the burned-over district. There, in the 19th century, the Second Great Awakening was a revival of Christianity; some new religions were also formed.

The region was active in reform and utopian movements. Many of its Underground Railroad sites have been documented. For example, the Harriet Tubman Home at Auburn recalls the life and work of the African-American "Moses of her people."

On the northern end of the Finger Lakes are also Seneca Falls, the birthplace of the women's suffrage movement; Waterloo, the birthplace of Memorial Day; and Palmyra, the birthplace of the Church of Jesus Christ of Latter-day Saints. An annual outdoor drama, The Hill Cumorah Pageant, produced by the church, draws thousands of visitors each year.

Hammondsport was the home of aviation pioneer Glenn Curtiss, and favorable air currents make the area a popular spot for glider pilots. Elmira, just to the south, was the home of Mark Twain in his later life, and the site of an infamous Civil War prison. Corning is most noted as the home of Corning Glass Works and the Corning Museum of Glass. Hornell, just southwest of the Finger Lakes, was a major railroad center; locomotives were repaired there for many years and rail passenger cars are built there today (2022).

Conesus remains the home of the oldest producer of pure grape sacramental wine in the Western hemisphere.

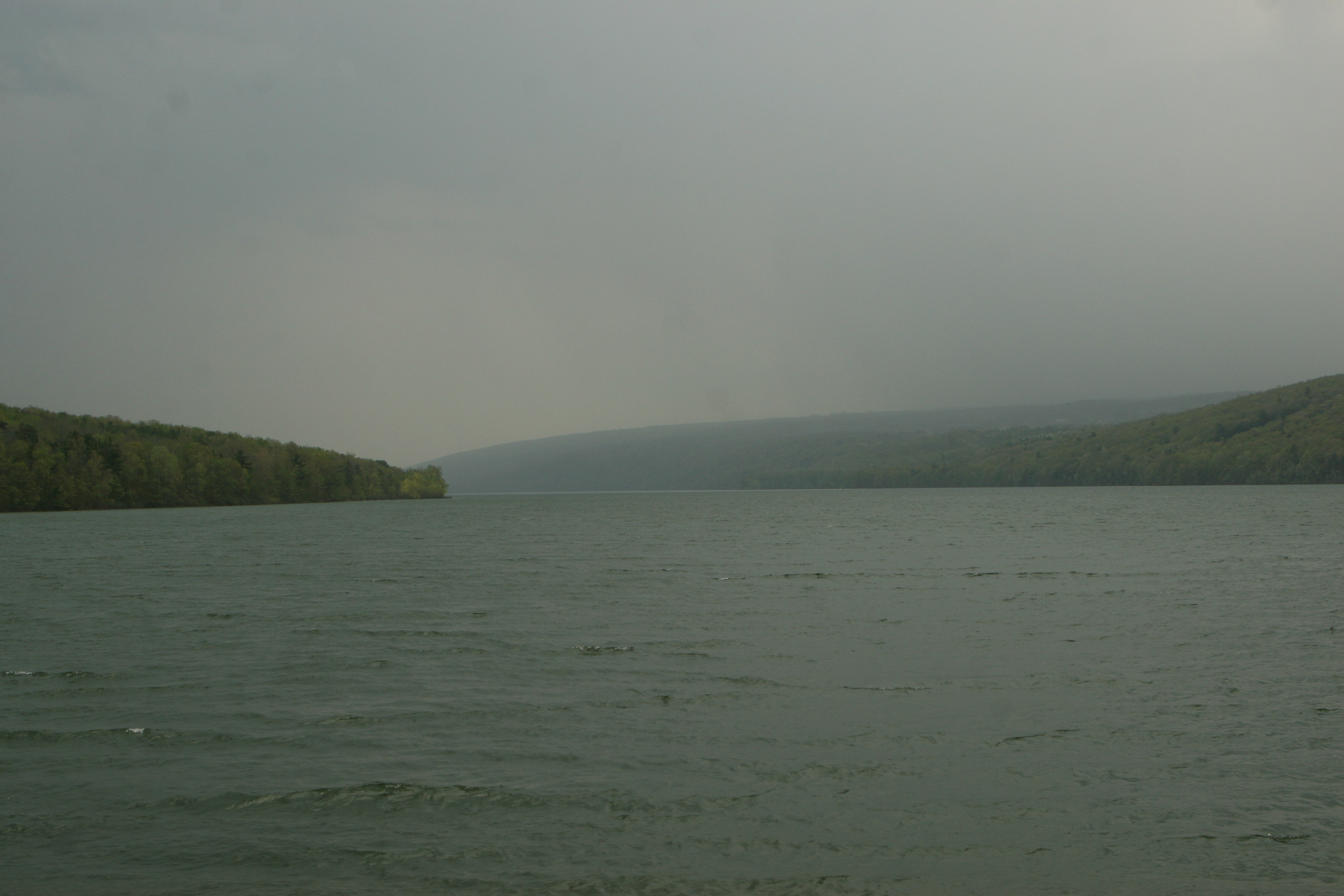
Hemlock Lake, one of the western Finger Lakes

Notable among the historic buildings of the region (most linked below) is the Granger Homestead (1816), a large village house in Federal Style at Canandaigua, New York. Another example of the Federal Style is the Prouty-Chew House (1829) at Geneva, portions of which were altered at various times in new fashions.

Three Greek Revival mansions are situated near three lakes: The Richard DeZeng House, Skaneateles (1839); Rose Hill, Geneva (1839); and Esperanza, Penn Yan (1838). The latter two are open to the public.

The Seward House in Auburn, a National Historic Landmark, is a mansion more characteristic of the Civil War era, virtually unchanged from the nineteenth century. Belhurst Castle, Geneva, a stone mansion in the Romanesque Revival style, now serves as an inn. Sonnenberg mansion at Canandaigua is a later nineteenth-century residence in the Queen Anne style, known for its restored period gardens. Geneva on the Lake is a villa (1910–14) that recalls those on Italian lakes. Now an inn, it has European-style gardens. Many buildings and historic districts of the Finger Lakes region are notable, in addition to these historic houses.

Implemented in August, 2010, the Hemlock-Canadice State Forest covers 6,684 acres (27.05 km^{2}) that encompass the two western Finger Lakes, Hemlock and Canadice. These lakes have provided drinking water for the City of Rochester for more than 100 years. To protect water quality, the city acquired much of the property around the lakes. Over the decades, the land reforested, but a few traces of its past, such as stone walls or cottage foundations, remain. Today these two lakes, with their steep, forested, largely-undeveloped shorelines and deep, clear water, provide visitors a glimpse of the Finger Lakes of the past. The Department of Environmental Conservation (DEC) manages this State Forest for compatible public access for recreation, including fishing, hunting, nature study, boating and hiking. Activities in Hemlock-Canadice State Forest are subject the DEC's Rules and Regulations for the Use of State Lands, 6 NYCRR Part 190, as well as any other applicable state statutes, rules and regulations. These are sensitive areas because they protect public drinking water.

The 584-mile (940 km) Finger Lakes Trail and its branch trails run through the southern portion of the Finger Lakes region and also constitute a portion of the 4,600 mile North Country National Scenic Trail.

Hemlock Lake is home to the state's oldest nesting bald eagle site, dating back to the early 1960s. The nesting bald eagles of Hemlock Lake have fostered a resurgence of bald eagles throughout New York State. Hemlock Lake, originally known as "O-Neh-Da" which is Seneca for "Lake of Hemlock Trees", is home to the nation's oldest sacramental winery, founded by Bishop McQuaid in 1872. Today, O-Neh-Da Vineyard continues to make premium natural pure grape wine for churches and foodies alike.

=== Wine ===
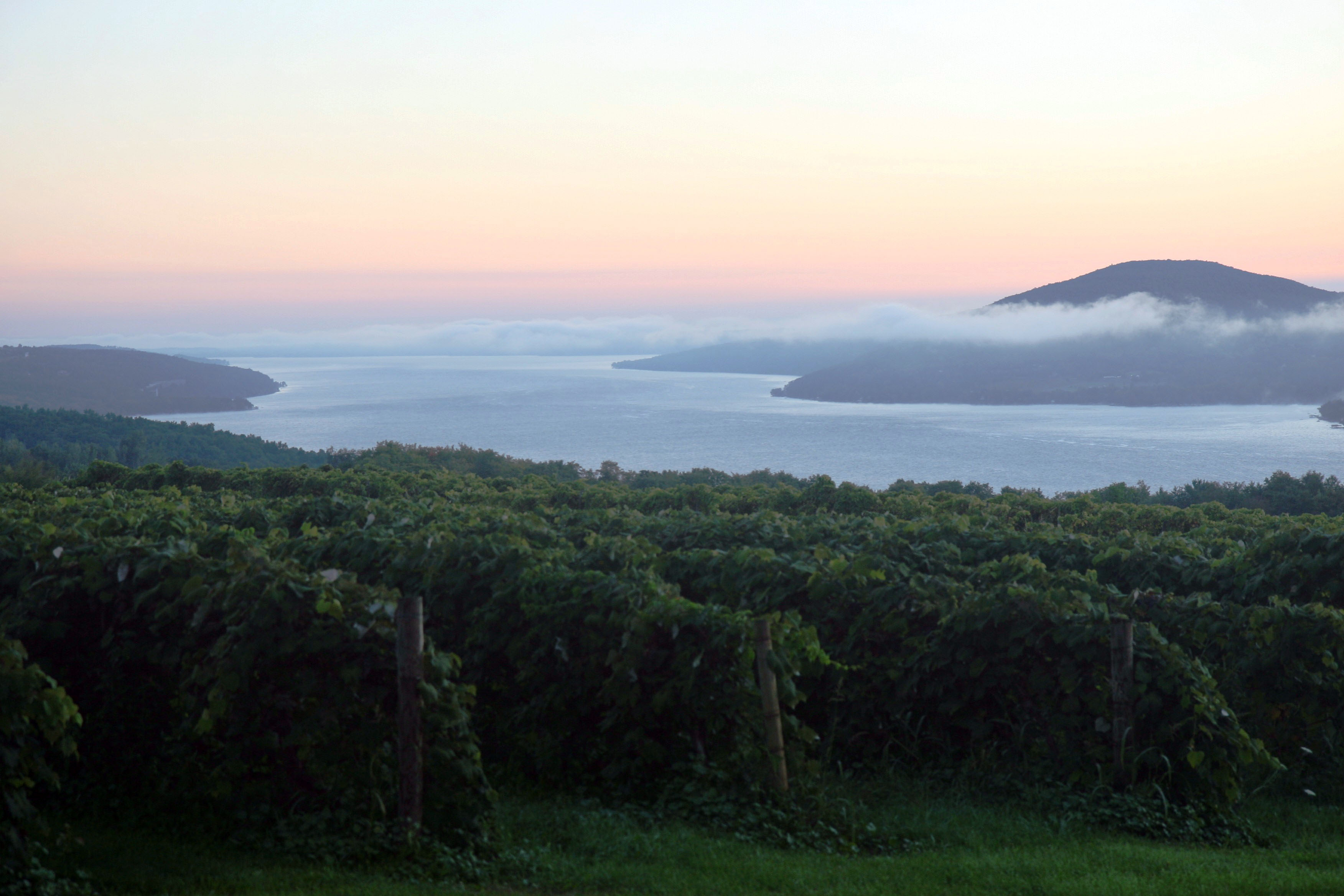
Sunrise overlooking a vineyard on Canandaigua Lake

The Finger Lakes region is New York's largest wine-producing region. Over 400 wineries and vineyards surround Seneca, Cayuga, Canandaigua, Keuka, Conesus, and Hemlock Lakes. Because of the lakes' great depth, they provide a lake effect to the lush vineyards that flank their shores. Due to the size and concentration of these lakes, the region retains residual summer warmth in the winter and winter's cold in the spring; as a result, the grapes are protected from disastrous spring frost during shoot growth, and early frost before the harvest. Additionally, due to the long, narrow, north-to-south positioning of the Finger Lakes, the slopes on the east and west side provide for variations in sunlight exposure, temperature, soil, and more; this leads to a great diversity of growing environments within the region and ultimately in the yielded wine.

The main grape varieties grown are Chardonnay, Riesling, Gewürztraminer, Pinot noir, Cabernet Franc, Vidal blanc, Seyval blanc and many Vitis labrusca (American native) varieties or cultivars.

With the passage of the Farm Winery Act in 1976, numerous wineries are now open to visitors. Wineries are a growth industry of the region, contributing through their production and by attracting visitors. The Finger Lakes American Viticulture Area (AVA) includes two of America's oldest wineries, O-Neh-Da Vineyard (1872) on Hemlock Lake and The Pleasant Valley Wine Company (1860) on Keuka Lake.

=== Craft beer ===
Aside from wine, the Finger Lakes' craft beer industry has grown significantly in recent years. In 2018 the region was home to the second-highest number of breweries in New York after the Hudson Valley.

=== Educational institutions ===
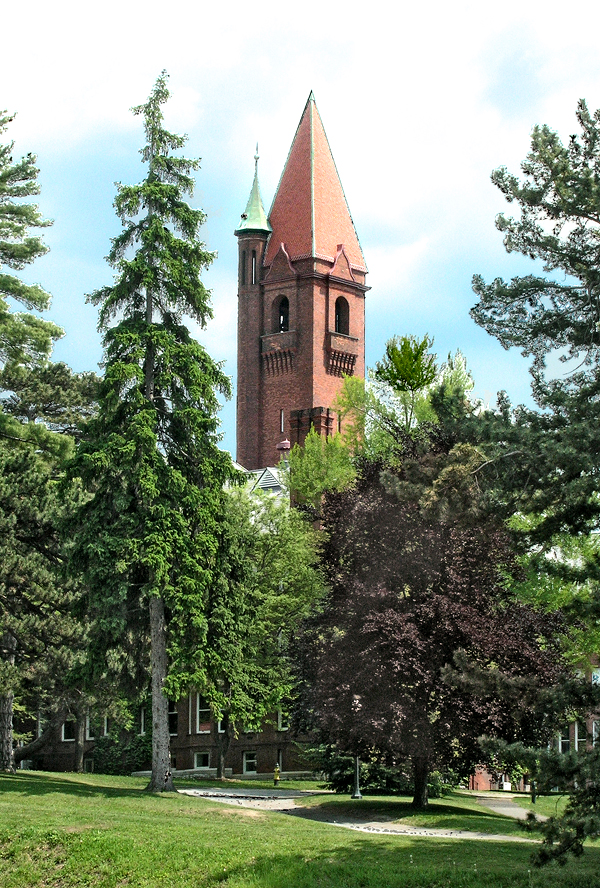
Wells College, Aurora

The area is also known for higher-education learning. The largest is Ivy League institution Cornell University, in Ithaca. Other notable schools are Ithaca College, also in Ithaca; Syracuse University, SUNY Upstate Medical University, Colgate University, State University of New York College of Environmental Science and Forestry, and Le Moyne College, in Syracuse; SUNY Cortland, in Cortland; Tompkins Cortland Community College in Dryden, Ithaca, and Cortland; Wells College in Aurora; Hobart and William Smith Colleges in Geneva; Keuka College in Keuka Park; Finger Lakes Community College in Canandaigua and Geneva; New York Chiropractic College in Seneca Falls and Cayuga Community College in Auburn.

Nearby the Finger Lakes is Binghamton University (SUNY), the University of Rochester, Nazareth College, St. John Fisher University, Roberts Wesleyan University, Monroe Community College, and Rochester Institute of Technology in Rochester; Elmira College in Elmira; Corning Community College in Corning; and the State University of New York at Geneseo.

=== Museums ===
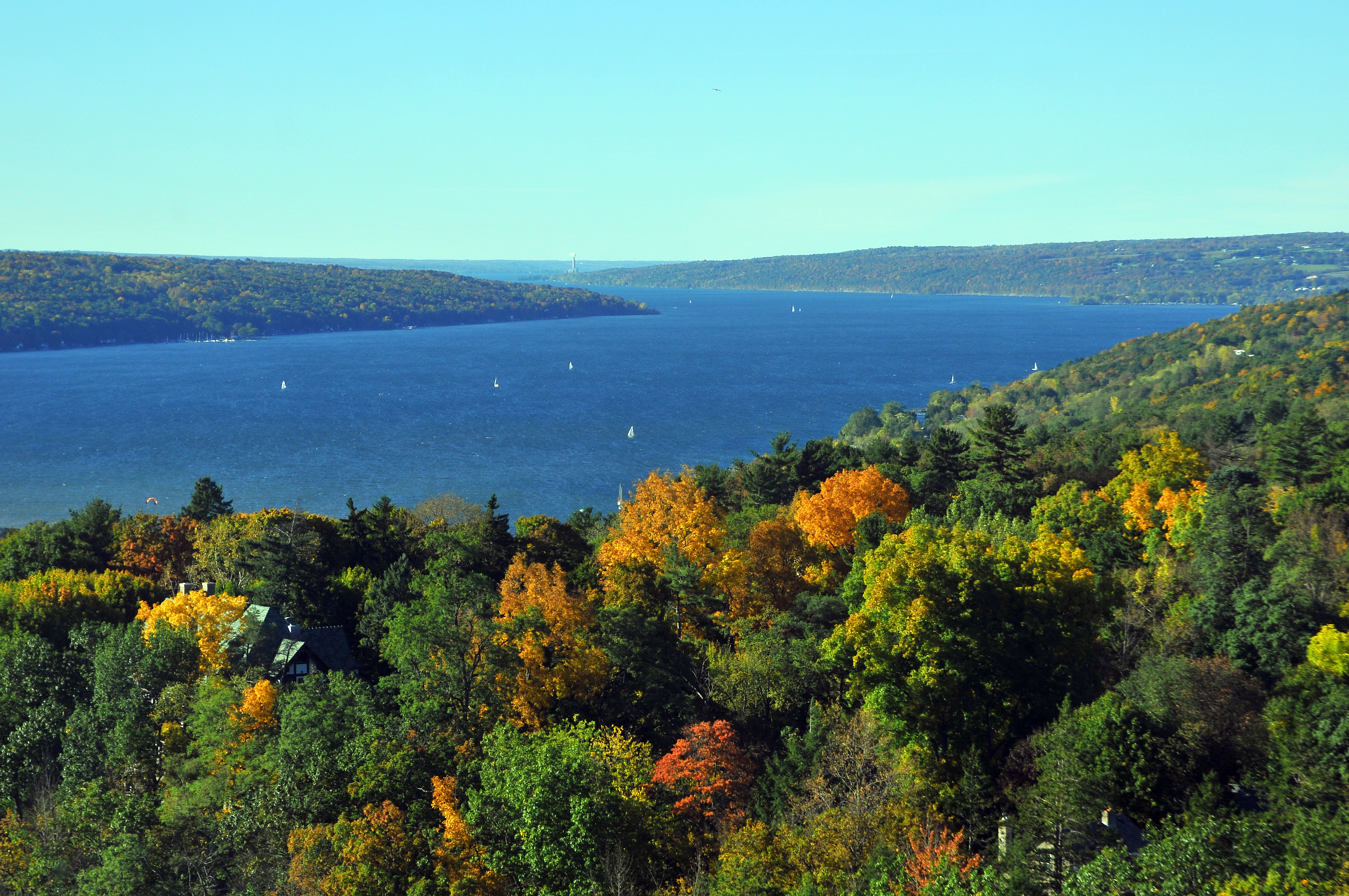
Cayuga Lake from Herbert F. Jonhson Museum of Art. Cornell University, Ithaca

The Finger Lakes region is home to several museums. These include the Corning Museum of Glass, the Johnson Museum of Art at Cornell University, the Strong National Museum of Play, the Glenn H. Curtiss Museum, the Finger Lakes Boating Museum, the Finger Lakes Wine Museum, the Wings of Eagles Discovery Center, the Sciencenter, the Museum of the Earth, the National Soaring Museum, the Rockwell Museum, the Seward House Museum, the William H. Seward and the Samuel Warren Homesteads of the New York Historical Society, birthplace of New York State's first successful commercial winery.

The Women's Rights National Historic Park is in Seneca Falls. The park includes the home of Elizabeth Cady Stanton and the Wesleyan Chapel, where she held the first convention on women's rights in 1848.

== Sources ==
- Thompson, John H., ed. Geography of New York State (Syracuse: Syracuse University Press, 1977)
- Engeln, O. D., von. The Finger Lakes Region: Its Origin and Nature (Ithaca: Cornell University Press, 1961, 1988)
- Finger Lakes Tourism Statistics
- Bloomfield, Jay A., ed. Lakes of New York State: Volume I: Ecology of the Finger Lakes (New York, NY: Academic Press, 1978)
