= List of wineries in Idaho =

Wineries in Idaho, List of

The following is a list of wineries in the state of Idaho.

== Table ==
Name	Size	Location	Established	Ref	AVA	E1/Acreage	Notes
3 Horse Ranch Vineyards	12000	Eagle	2002		Eagle Foothills	3000/69	3rd in production; Grapes:Cabernet Sauvignon, Chardonnay, Malbec, Mourvèdre, Pinot Gris, Red Blends, Riesling, Rosé, Syrah, Viognier
3100 Cellars	500	Garden City	2016		Snake River	10	Sparkling, named for 3,100 whitewater river miles in Idaho
Arena Valley Vineyard		Parma	2000		Snake River	0 / 75	Gewürztraminer, Riesling
Bankhead Orchard		Payette			Snake River	0 / 0	
Bitner Vineyards		Caldwell	1981		SunnySlope	0 / 15	Cabernet Sauvignon, Chardonnay, Merlot, Petit Verdot, Riesling, Syrah, Viognier
Bruneau Valley Vineyards		Bruneau					
Cabin View Winery		Sandpoint	2021		Lewis-Clark	3000 / ?	Cabernet Sauvignon, Malbec, Merlot, Dolcetto, Syrah
Camas Prairie Winery	2000	Bovill	1983			? / ?	Also Meadery Grapes:Cabernet Sauvignon, Chardonnay, Gewürztraminer, Lemberger, Mead, Merlot, Muscat, Pinot Noir, Riesling, Sparkling Wine
Castaway Cellars		Coeur d'Alene			Lewis-Clark		Sauvignon Blanc, Rosé (Pinot Noir), Chardonnay, Malbec, Cabernet Franc
Cinder Wines	10000	Boise	2006		Snake River		Chardonnay, Syrah, Tempranillo
Clearwater Canyon Cellars		Lewiston	2004		Lewis-Clark	0 / 0	2020 Northwest Winery of the Year, Umiker Estate Vineyard
Coeur d'Alene Cellars		Coeur d'Alene	2002		Columbia Valley, WA		Pend Oreille Winery
Coiled Wines	2000	Garden City	2008		Snake River		Translations; Chardonnay, Riesling, Sparkling Wine, Syrah
Cold Springs Winery		Hammett	1998		Snake River	/ 34	Cabernet Sauvignon, Chardonnay, Merlot, Pinot Gris, Pinot Noir, Riesling, Syrah, Viognier
Colter's Creek Winery		Juliaetta	Oct. 1983		Lewis-Clark	/ 28	19 cultivars: Cabernet Franc, Cabernet Sauvignon, Chardonnay, Merlot, Pinot Gris, Red Blends, Riesling, Syrah
Cuesta Sol Vineyards	0	Caldwell	2022		Snake River	0 / 0	notes
Dude Dewalt Cellars		Eagle	2011		Eagle Foothills	0 / 0	notes
Frenchman's Gulch Winery		Ketchum	2000		Snake River	0 / 0	Phinny Hill Vineyards: Cabernet Sauvignon, Chardonnay, Syrah
Fujishin Family Cellars & Free Dog Wines		Caldwell	2009		Snake River	0 / 0	Lost West Winery, established 2012. Chardonnay, Dessert Wine, Late Harvest, Merlot, Petite Sirah, Riesling, Syrah, Viognier
Hat Ranch Winery		Caldwell	2011		Snake River	0 / 0	Vale Wine Company: Chardonnay, Malbec, Muscat, Riesling, Tempranillo
Hells Canyon Winery & Zhoo Zhoo Wines		Caldwell	1981		Snake River	2,700 / 39	18.8 kilowatt photo-voltaic array; chardonnay, cabernet sauvignon, merlot, cabernet franc and syrah
Holesinsky Vineyard & Winery		Buhl	2001			3,800/ 14	Syrah, Merlot, Ice Wine, Chardonnay, Riesling and Rose
Huston Vineyards		Huston	Yr		Snake River	2500 / 0	Cabernet Sauvignon, Merlot, Syrah, and Malbec
Indian Creek Winery		Kuna	1982			0 / 0	Estate Stowe Vineyard
Jovinea Cellars		Lenore	2018		Lewis-Clark	0 / 0	Touriga Nacional, Tinta Cao, Montepulciano, Dolcetto, & Roussanne
Kerry Hill Winery		Wilder	2001			0 / 30	Malbec, Merlot, Cabernet Sauvignon, Cabernet Franc, Tempranillo, Petit Verdot, Port, Carménère, Pinot Grigio, and Chardonnay
Kindred Vineyards		Caldwell				0 / 0	
Koenig Vineyards		Caldwell	1995		Snake River	0 / 8	Also a Distillery, Lanae Ridge, Scoria and Williamson Vineyards. Grapes: Viognier, Syrah, Cabernet Sauvignon, Merlot, Riesling, Sangiovese, Petite Sirah, Chardonnay
Lindsay Creek Vineyards		Lewiston	2007		Lewis-Clark	0 / 0	
Owyhee Vista Vineyard	150	Kuna				0 / 0	
Par Terre Winery	"Nano"	Garden City				0 / 0	
Parma Ridge Winery	2015	Parma				0 / 0	
Pend d’Oreille Winery		Sandpoint	1995		outside of AVA	0 / 0	
Rivaura vineyards		Lewiston	2014		Lewis-Clark	0 / 0	
Rolling Hills Vineyard		Eagle	1970s			0 / 10	
Sandstone Vineyards		Kuna				0 / 5	
Sawtooth Winery	150000	Caldwell	1987		Snake River	0 / 500+	Grapes: Riesling, Pinot Gris, Syrah, Merlot and Tempranillo
Split Rail Winery		Garden City			Blender	0 / 0	
Ste. Chapelle Winery	150000	Caldwell	1975		Snake River	0 / 0	Wedding and Concert venue
Sweetbriar Winery	100	Mountain Home	2012			0 / 0	
Syringa Winery	500	Kuna	2008			0 / 0	
Telaya Wine Company	11000	Garden City	2008		Multiple	0 / 0	
Y Knot Winery		Glenns Ferry	1988		Snake River	20	Winery, Restaurant, RV park, Lodging

== Former wineries ==
The following is a list of wineries that have closed; this list is for tracking former locations.

Winery	Location	Established	Closed
Diamond Q Vineyard & Winery	Russell	2005	2020
Potter Wines	Garden City	2012	2024

== See also ==
- Idaho wine
- Idaho American Viticultural Areas
- List of breweries in Idaho
- Wine of the United States
