= Canadice =

Canadice may refer to:

- Canadice (grape)
- Canadice, New York
- Canadice Lake
