= Regional climate levels in viticulture =

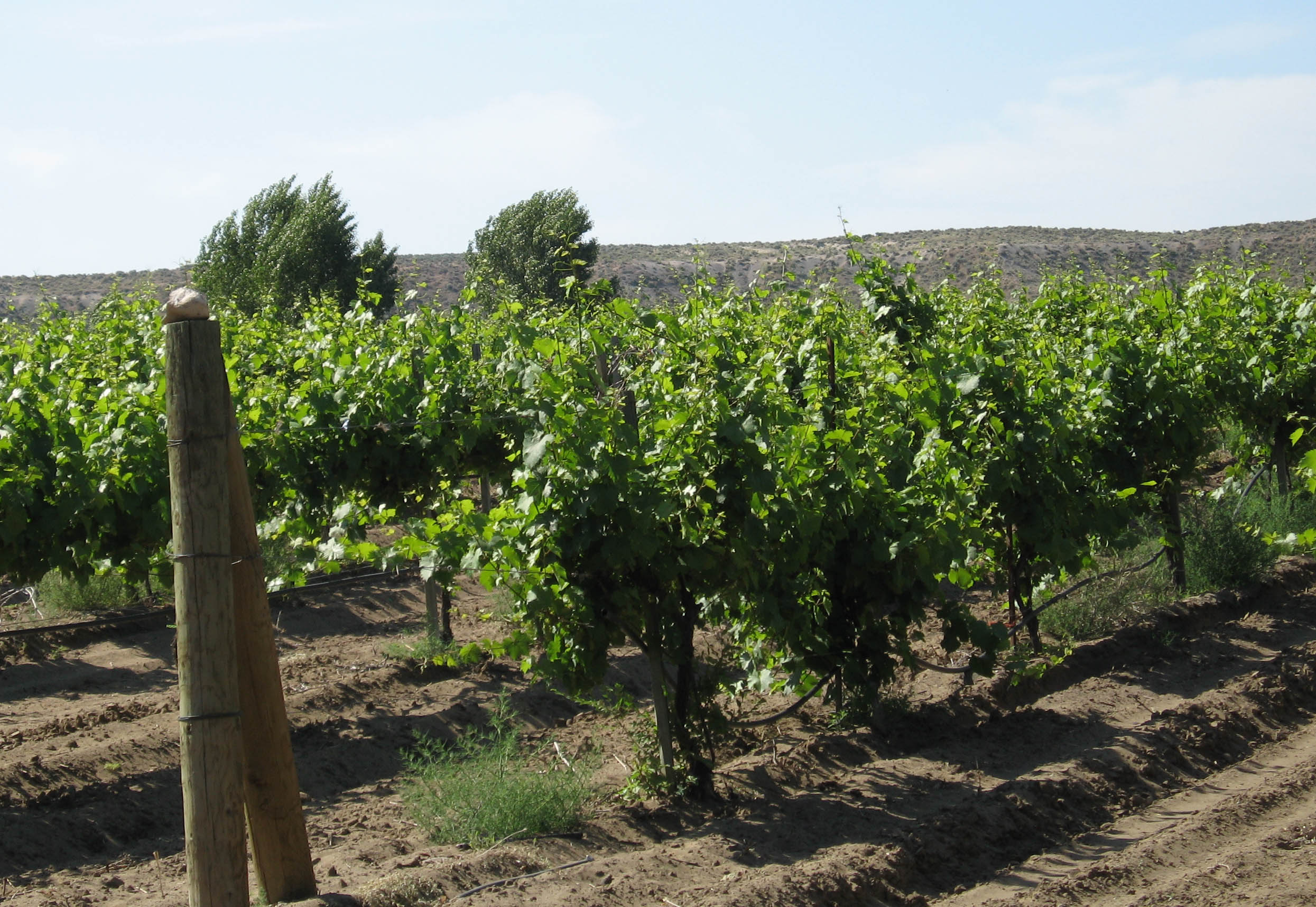
The microclimate of these vines in Idaho is influenced by mesoclimate of the vineyard and the macroclimate of the Snake River Valley AVA.

In viticulture, there are several levels of regional climates that are used to describe the terroir or immutable characteristics of an area. These levels can be as broad as a macroclimate which includes entire wine regions or as small as a microclimate which includes the unique environment around an individual grapevine. In the middle is the mesoclimate which usually describes the characteristics of a particular vineyard site.

== Levels ==
- Macroclimate, in viticulture, refers to the regional climate of a broad area such as an American Viticultural Area (AVA) or a French Appellation d'origine contrôlée (AOC). It can include an area on the scale of tens to hundreds of kilometers. On smaller scales are the related designations of mesoclimate and microclimate.
- Mesoclimate refers to the climate of a particular vineyard site and is generally restricted to a space of tens or hundreds of meters.
- Microclimate refers to the specific environment in a small restricted spaces-such as a row of vines. The more delineated term canopy microclimate refers to the environment around an individual grapevine. although many viticulturists use the term "microclimate" when talking about an individual vine and the effects of canopy management.

== See also ==
- Climate categorizations in viticulture
- Mesothermal valley
