= List of breweries in Idaho =

Breweries in Idaho

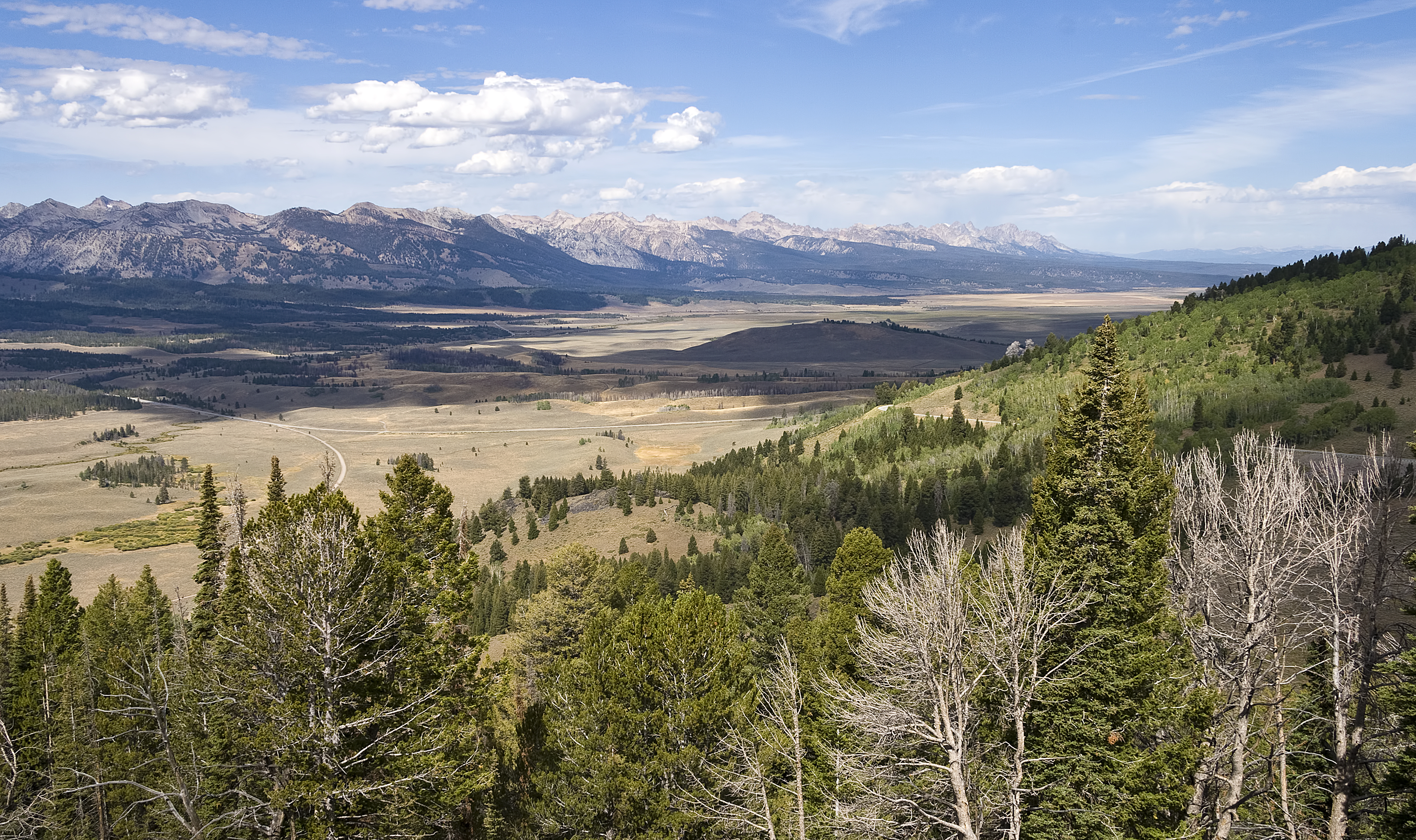
Sawtooth Valley, Idaho

Breweries in Idaho produce many different styles of beer. Some breweries package their beer in bottles or cans for retail sale. Some breweries produce kegs of beer, to be sold on draft at taverns and restaurants, or at the brewery's own tap room. Brewpubs combine brewing operations with full-service restaurants. Commercially licensed breweries use one or several of these methods to sell their products.

Since the turn of the century, the number of craft breweries in Idaho has increased significantly, reflecting a national trend.

== Breweries ==
- 10 Barrel Brewing Company – Brewpubs in Boise, Idaho, Bend, Oregon, and Portland, Oregon, production brewery and bottling line in Bend, opened in 2006
- Atmos Brewing Co., a subsidiary of Sawtooth brewery specializing in near-beer.
- Barbarian Brewing – Garden City, bottling line, tap room, opened in 2015
- Bear Island Brewing Company – Boise, opened in 2014
- Bertram's Brewery – Salmon, brewpub, opened in 1998
- Boise Brewing – Boise, bottling line, taproom, opened in 2014
- Broken Horn Brewing Company – McCall, taproom, opened in 2013
- Brown Beard Brewing - Garden City, opened in March 2023
- Cloud 9 Brewery – Boise, brewpub, opened 2014
- Crescent Brewery – Nampa, taproom, opened in 2009
- Crooked Fence Brewing Company – Eagle, brewery with bottling, canning, and taproom, and second location with brewpub, opened in 2012
- Daft Badger Brewing – Coeur d'Alene, brewpub, opened in 2015
- Downdraft Brewing Company – Post Falls, taproom, opened in 2014
- Gem State Brewing
- Grand Teton Brewing – Victor, bottling line, taproom, opened in 1988; Idaho's oldest brewery
- Highlands Hollow Brewhouse – Boise, brewpub, opened in 1992; Boise's oldest brewery
- Idaho Brewing Company – Idaho Falls, taproom, opened in 2009
- Kootenai River Brewing Company – Bonners Ferry, brewpub, opened in 2010
- Laughing Dog Brewery – Ponderay, bottling line, taproom, opened in 2005
- Loose Screw Brewing – Garden City, taproom, opened in 2016
- Mad Bomber Brewing Company – Hayden, taproom, opened in 2013
- McCall Brewing Company – McCall, bottling line and brewpub, opened in 1994
- MickDuff's Brewing Company – Sandpoint, brewpub, opened in 2006
- Moscow Brewing Company – Moscow, taproom, opened in 2013, closed in 2016, reopened under new ownership in 2017
- Mother Earth Brewing Company – Nampa
- North Idaho Mountain Brew – Wallace, brewpub, opened in 2011
- Paragon Brewing – Coeur d'Alene, brewpub, opened in 2013
- Payette Brewing Company – Boise, canning line, taproom, opened in 2010; Idaho's biggest brewery
- Portneuf Valley Brewing – Pocatello, brewpub, opened in 2002
- Post Falls Brewing Company – Post Falls, opened in 2016
- Powderhaus Brewing Company – Garden City, taproom, opened in 2015
- Ram Restaurant & Brewery – the company originated in Washington and now has more than 20 locations, including Boise and Meridian
- Ruckus Brewing - Garden City
- Salmon River Brewery – McCall, brewpub, opened in 2008
- Sawtooth Brewery – Ketchum, brewpub, opened in 2011
- Selkirk Abbey Brewing Company – Post Falls, bottling line, taproom, opened in 2012
- Slate Creek Brewing Company – Coeur d'Alene, taproom, opened in 2013
- Snow Eagle Brewing & Grill – Idaho Falls, brewpub, opened in 2012
- Sockeye Brewing – Boise, canning line, two brewpubs, founded in 1996
- Sun Valley Brewing Company – Hailey, brewpub, opened in 1996
- Trestle Brewing Company – Ferdinand, taproom, opened in 2014
- Tricksters Brewing Company – Coeur d'Alene, bottling line, taproom, opened in 2012
- Von Scheidt Brewing Company – Twin Falls, taproom, founded in 2009
- Wallace Brewing Company – Wallace, bottling line, taproom, opened in 2008
- Warfield Distillery & Brewery – Ketchum, brewpub, opened in 2015
- Western Collective – Garden City, taproom, opened in 2018
- White Dog Brewing White Dog Brewing - Boise (Opened Sept 2017)
- Wildlife Brewing Company – Victor, brewpub, opened in 2003
- Wolftrack Brewing and Tasting Den – Cottonwood, taproom, opened in 2013
- Woodland Empire Ale Craft – Boise, bottling line, taproom, opened in 2014, While the Pub closed in 2024, the brewery lives on.

=== Closed breweries ===
- Bella Brewing – Garden City, taproom, opened in 2016
- BiPlane Brewing Company – Post Falls
- Brownstone Restaurant & Brewhouse – Idaho Falls
- Clairvoyant Brewing – Garden City, taproom, opened in 2017 - Closed in 2025
- Coeur d'Alene Brewing Company – Coeur d'Alene
- County Line Brewing – Garden City, taproom, opened in 2015 - Bought by Clairvoyant in 2022
- Crooked Fence Brewing - Garden City
- Edge Brewing Company – Boise, bottling line and brewpub, opened in 2014, Closed in 2024
- Haff Brewing – Garden City
- Hollister Mountain Brewing Company – Coeur d'Alene
- Kilted Dragon Brewing – Garden City
- M.J. Barleyhoppers – Lewiston
- PostModern Brewers – Boise
- Slanted Rock Brewing Company – Meridian
- Snake River Brewing Company – Caldwell
- TableRock Brewpub & Grill – Boise
- Trail Creek Brewing Company – Twin Falls

== See also ==
- List of wineries in Idaho
