= C. Lloyd Mahaffey =

American computer executive

- Born: December 31, 1954 (age 71); Rock Hill, South Carolina, U.S.
- Occupations: Business, technology
- Years active: 1978–present
- Known for: Apple Macintosh education and federal sales manager
- Parent(s): Nancy Mahaffey, Lloyd Mahaffey

C. Lloyd Mahaffey (born December 31, 1954) is an American computer executive, who led the Apple Education division, and then Apple's Federal Systems Group in Washington, D.C., which concentrated on the U.S. Department of Defense, civilian and intelligence agencies.

== Early life and education ==
Mahaffey was born on December 31, 1954, in Rock Hill, South Carolina, to Nancy and Lloyd Mahaffey.

He graduated in 1978 from The Citadel, The Military College of South Carolina in Charleston, South Carolina, with a Bachelor of Arts degree in history. In 1987 Mahaffey enrolled in the Stanford University Graduate School of Business Technology Executive Program, where his attendance was sponsored by Apple.

== Professional career ==
After graduating from The Citadel in 1978, Mahaffey accepted a position at PCA International, where he used Honeywell industrial process controls to manage water and air temperature for photographic processing. In 1980 he joined Honeywell as a sales engineer, and was promoted to Sales Manager over the Carolinas division in 1981.

=== Apple ===
In 1983 he was recruited by Apple to be a District Manager for the Carolinas and Tennessee where he participated in the launch of a project, the Apple macintosh In 1984, he was promoted to Regional Manager for the Southeast United States. During his tenure, he secured the Basic Skills First computer contract from the State of Tennessee, outfitting every 8th grade classroom in Tennessee with Macintosh computers.

In 1985 Mahaffey was promoted to Director of Apple's Education Group and relocated to Cupertino, California. For three years, he managed a sales model focusing on K-12 schools and universities, and turned Apple Education into a billion-dollar business unit. His team created school computer lab bundles, ensured compliance with state contracts, and helped secure low-interest loans so teachers could purchase computers. They also retailed directly to students through university campus bookstores. These factors helped make the Apple Macintosh a dominant player in the education market, allowing it to go head to head with its main competitor, IBM. In 1988, he was awarded Apple's Higher Education Impact Award.

In 1988 he was asked to lead Apple's Federal Systems Group in Washington, D.C., to carve out a market in the U.S. Department of Defense, that would include civilian and intelligence agencies. From 1988 to 1990, he worked with agencies that had the flexibility to purchase non-standard and non-contract computer systems, and built a systems integration team that allowed these agencies to move away from the predominant MS-DOS solutions.

=== Subsequent career ===
In 1990 Mahaffey left Apple to pursue technology consulting endeavors in Washington, D.C. He also served as Board Director and chief executive officer of Start, Inc., from 1990 to 1994, and on the board of directors at First Patriot Bancshares, FDIC from 1989 to 1994.

[Missing here – He joined Commodore Business Machines, Inc. as V.P. Marketing out of the West Chester, PA headquarters. This was during a final rally by the company to promote its unique, but ultimately ill-fated "Amiga" multimedia products.]

In 1994 he returned to the West Coast to join Verifone as Vice President of Consumer Products, and subsequently Senior Vice President of Marketing and Internet Software Services and, eventually, as Chief Operating Officer. As the COO, he led the team that closed the transaction that completed VeriFone's acquisition by Hewlett-Packard for a $1.18 billion stock swap in 1998, the fourth largest tech acquisition in the world that year.

After VeriFone Mahaffey joined Redleaf Venture Management. While there, he was a member of the board of directors at Avidyne from 2000 to 2005, and at Lightningcast from 1999 to 2006. In 2004, he relocated to his property in Eagle, Idaho, where, in 2005, he founded the Carloma Group, a holding company with interests in real estate, renewable energy, and aviation assets.

In Idaho he served as the chairman of the board of directors for Sento from 2004 to 2008,. From 2005 to 2009 he served as the Chairman of the Economic Advisory Council for the Idaho Department of Commerce, which distributed federal grants for rural public works projects and regional economic development. He also served as a member of the board of directors for Unity Media Group and networking company Cradlepoint from 2009 to 2011 and 2010–2012, respectively.

In 2013 Mahaffey teamed with Michael Boerner to launch SmartStory Technologies in Silicon Valley, a SaaS platform that pairs loyalty data with point of sale data and subject matter expertise to provide personalized content and videos to customers.

As chair of the Economic Advisory Counsel, Mahaffey was one of three authors of the proposal to create an American Viticulture Area called the Snake River Valley AVA in Southwest Idaho, along with Ron Bitner and David Wilkins. It was approved by the US Treasury and is now recognized as a wine appellation in the United States.

== Awards ==
- Apple Higher Education Impact Award, Apple, Inc.
- The Citadel Distinguished Life Alumnus Award – 2013, The Citadel
