= Surel's Place =

Coordinates: 43°37′26″N 116°14′08″W

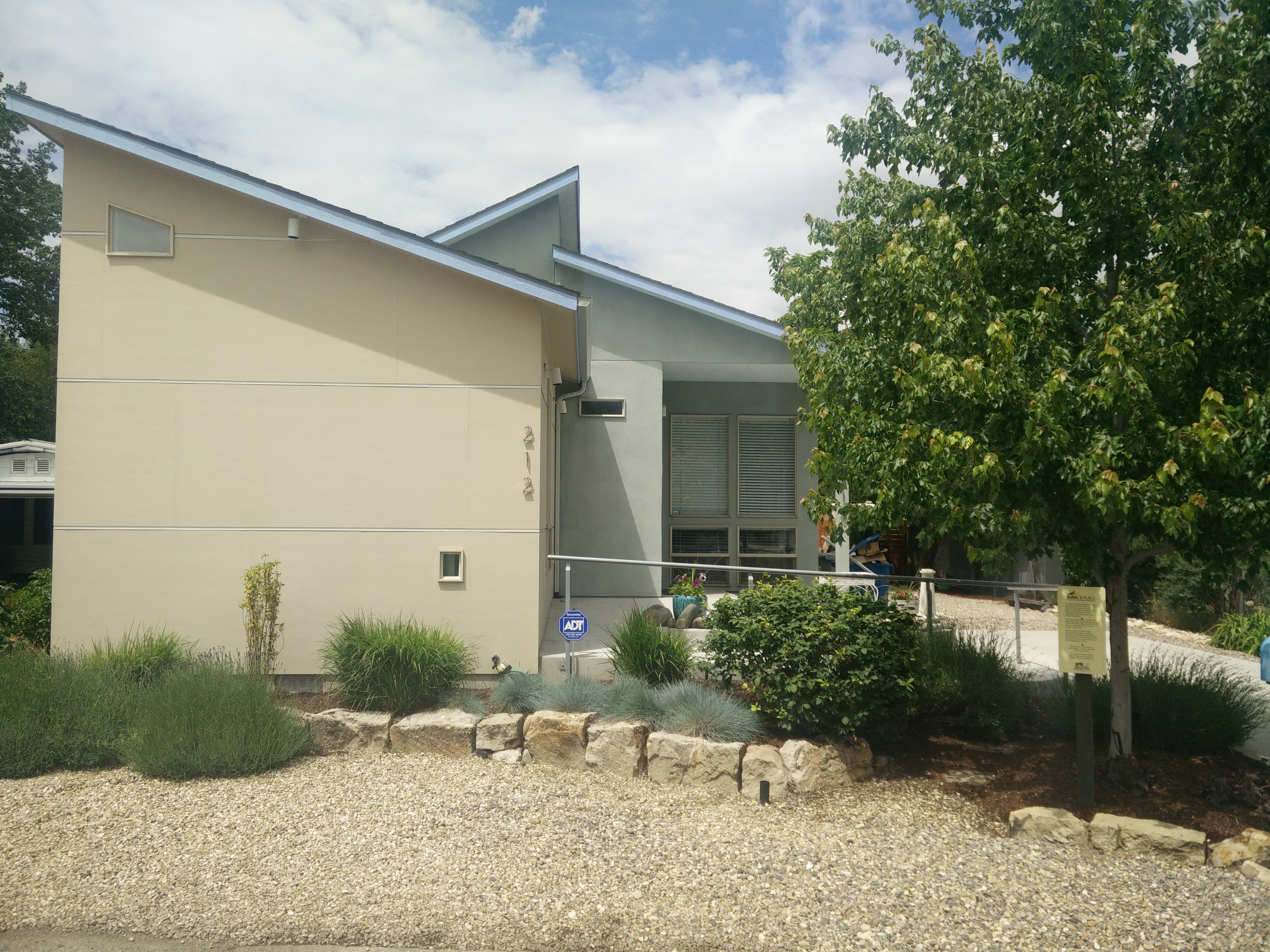
Surel's Place in Garden City, Idaho

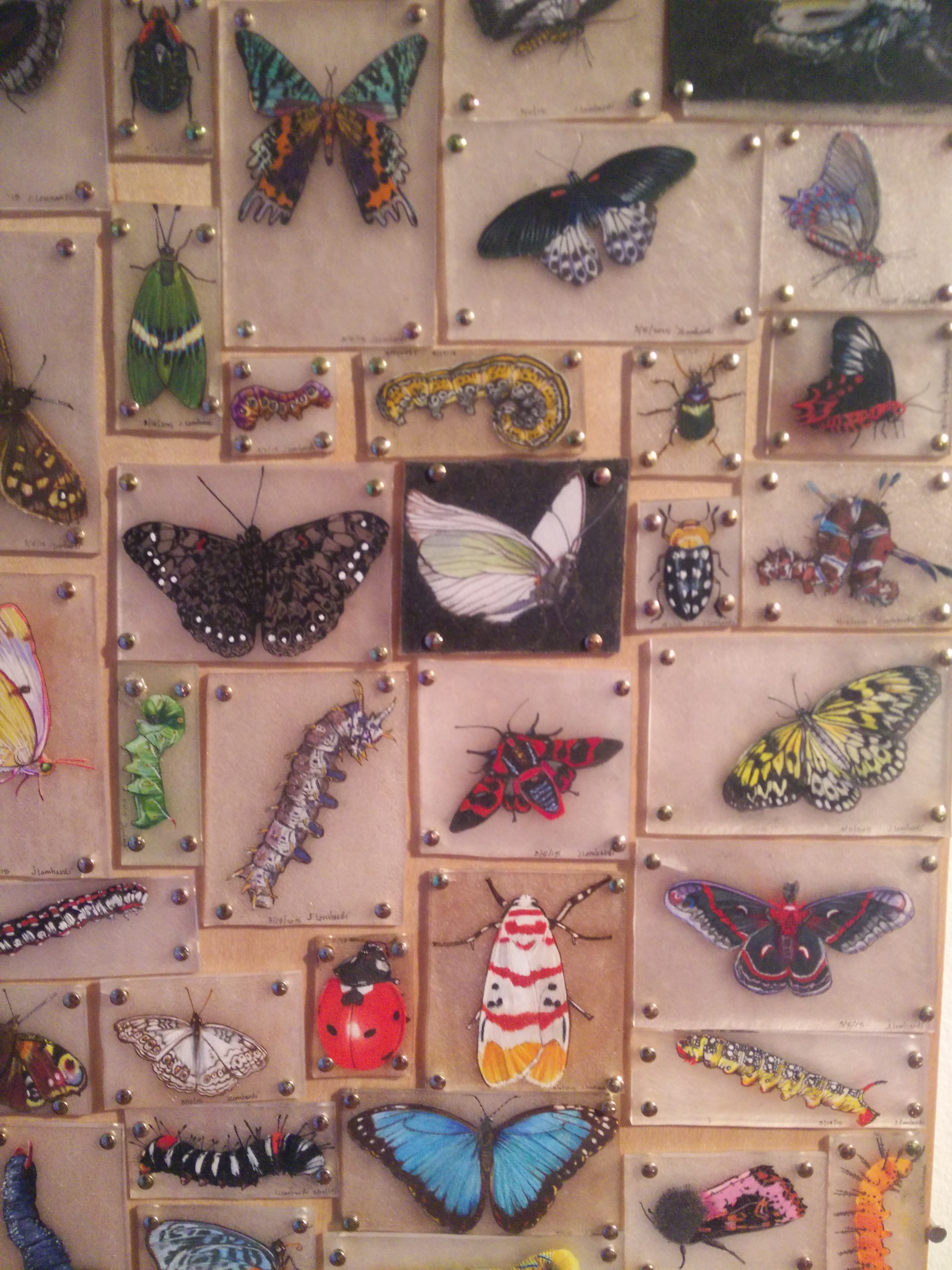
Shrinky Dinks butterflies on auction in May 2015

Surel's Place is an artist in residency program located in Garden City, Idaho, in a home studio designed by local artist Surel Lee Mitchell, who died of lung cancer on October 10, 2011, twenty years after she quit smoking (only non-smokers are accepted). Established in 2011, it is Idaho's only live-in artist-in-residency program. The studio serves as the anchor of the eponymous neighborhood The Surel Mitchell Live/Work/Create District. Surel's Place is steps away from the Boise Greenbelt, blocks away from the Visual Arts Collective, and minutes via bicycle to downtown Boise itself.

Each residency (submissions are by open application) is typically for one month; twenty-four artists have resided there as of October 2015 (including tap dancer Andrew Nemr). “You forget to eat,” Kansas City-based painter David Titterington, who stayed at Surel’s in July of that year. “I got so much done. Way more than at other residencies." Since its inception, glass artist Zion Warne, mixed media painter Sam Paden, architect and furniture craftsman Derek Hurd, and illustrator Julia Green have also come to Garden City, and Surel's Place has become an integral part of the city's revival.

== Grants ==
In June 2015 it was announced that would receive a $3,027 grant for 2016 from the Idaho Commission on the Arts.
