= Mother Earth Brewing Company =

Craft beer brewery

- Location: Vista, California
- Opened: 2010; 15 years ago
- Key people: Daniel Love, Errin Love, Jon Love, Kamron Khannakhjavani, Joelle Khannakhjavani, Sally Cullerton
- Owned by: Daniel Love
- Distribution: Yes
- Website: www.motherearthbrewco.com

Active beers
Cali Creamin' - Vanilla Cream Ale, Cali Creamin' Creamsicle - Orange Vanilla Cream Ale, Boo Koo - IPA, Tierra Madre - Lager, Sin Tax - Imperial Peanut Butter Stout, 4Seasons, Project X
Name	Type

Mother Earth Brewing Company is a family-owned craft beer brewery located in Vista, California, and Nampa, Idaho. The brewery was founded in San Diego County by Daniel Love and Kamron Khannakhjavani in 2010.

== History ==
Mother Earth Brew Co. was founded in 2010. On June 23, 2012, it added the Vista Tap House after the Original Vista Brewery, adding 4,000 square feet (370 m^{2}) with a brew shop, which has since been removed. In late 2014, Mother Earth started canning their beers. In 2016, Mother Earth opened an additional production facility and tasting room in Nampa, Idaho, just outside Boise, Idaho. Founder and CEO Daniel Love moved to look over the facility that was projected in 2016 to produce 22,000 barrels in its first year, which would make them Idaho's largest brewery. 11 months after opening in Nampa, the brewery was capable of producing 100,000 barrels of beer. Between all three locations, they brew and serve beer on over 70,000 square feet (6,500 m^{2}).

== Ingredients ==
The malted barley comes from Great Western Malting in Pocatello, Idaho and their hops come from Washington.

== Collaborations ==
Beer Name	Beer Style	In Collaboration with	Year
"BooKooK" IPA	Double India Pale Ale	Pizza Port	2016

== Awards ==
Name	Style	Honors
Cali Creamin'	Cream Ale	2016 US Open Beer Championship Bronze
ESB	ESB	2016 Great American Beer Festival Bronze
Fresh As It Gets	India Pale Ale	2017 Great American Beer Festival Bronze
Cali Creamin'	Vanilla Cream Ale	2016 US Open Beer Championship Bronze
ESB	ESB	2016 World Beer Cup Silver
ESB	ESB	2016 San Diego International Beer Competition Gold
Hop Diggity	Double India Pale Ale	2014 Los Angeles International Beer Competition Bronze
Hop Diggity	Double India Pale Ale	2015 Los Angeles International Beer Competition Bronze
Hop Diggity	Double India Pale Ale	2013 Denver International Beer Competition Silver
Hop Diggity	Double India Pale Ale	2013 San Diego International Beer Competition Bronze
BooKoo	India Pale Ale	2015 Los Angeles International Beer Competition Silver
SinTax	Imperial Peanut Butter Stout	2014 San Diego International Beer Competition Gold
¿Por Que No?	Imerpial Brown Ale	2010 Spirits of Mexico Gold
Four Seasons Autumn 2014 "Zingaro"	Russian Imperial Stout	2015 San Diego International Beer Competition Bronze
Vanilla Storm	Imperial Porter	2011 National Home Brewers Convention Pro-Am Gold
Fresh As It Gets	Wet Hop India Pale Ale	2017 Great American Beer Festival Bronze
Four Seasons Spring 2017	Saison	2017 Los Angeles International Beer Competition Silver
Four Seasons Winter 2016	Imperial Stout	2017 Los Angeles International Beer Competition Silver
Renown Brown	Brown Ale	2017 San Diego International Beer Competition Gold
Four Seasons Winter 2016	Imperial Stout	2017 US Open Silver

== See also ==
- Beer in San Diego County, California
- List of breweries in San Diego County, California
- List of breweries in Idaho
