= Lewis-Clark Valley AVA =

American Viticultural Area in Washington and Oregon

Coordinates: 46°29′52″N 116°45′42″W

Lewis-Clark Valley
- Wine region
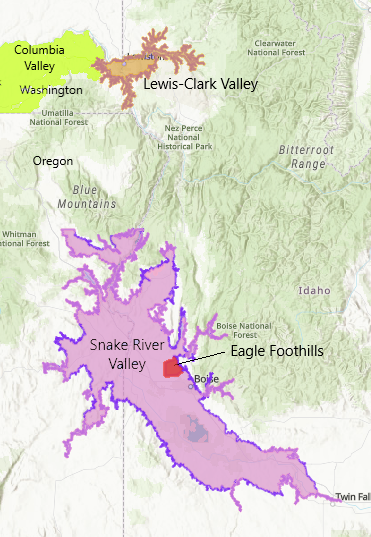
- Idaho AVAs
- Type: American Viticultural Area
- Year established: 2016
- Years of wine industry: 154
- Country: United States
- Part of: Idaho, Washington
- Growing season: 214 days
- Climate region: Region II
- Heat units: 2,613 to 3,036 GDD units
- Precipitation (annual average): 11 to 22 inches (279–559 mm)
- Soil conditions: loess, wind-deposited, nutrient-rich silt, mollisols
- Total area: 479 square miles (306,560 acres)
- Size of planted vineyards: 100 acres (40 ha)
- No. of vineyards: 8
- Grapes produced: Blaufränkisch(Lemberger), Cabernet Franc, Cabernet Sauvignon, Carmenere, Chardonnay, Gewürztraminer, Grenache, Malbec, Merlot, Petit Verdot, Pinot Noir, Sangiovese, Syrah, Tempranillo, Muscat, Pinot Gris, Riesling, Rkatsiteli, Sauvignon Blanc, Semillon. Viognier, Zinfandel
- No. of wineries: 4

Lewis-Clark Valley is a multi-state American Viticultural Area (AVA) located in the landform across portions of Nez Perce, Lewis, Clearwater and Latah Counties in northern Idaho and Asotin, Garfield, and Whitman Counties in southeastern Washington. It was established as the nation's 235^{th}, Washington's ninth and Idaho's third appellation on April 20, 2016 by the Alcohol and Tobacco Tax and Trade Bureau (TTB), Treasury after reviewing the petition submitted by Dr. Alan Busacca, a licensed geologist and founder of Vinitas Consultants, LLC, on behalf of the Palouse-Lewis Clark Valley Wine Alliance and the Clearwater Economic Development Association, proposing the viticultural area named "Lewis-Clark Valley."

The region encompasses 479 square miles (306,560 acres) with nearly 100 acres (40 ha) under vine throughout the Lewis-Clark Valley between the Clearwater and mid-Snake Rivers and their tributaries. It borders the northern part of the Oregon-Washington established Columbia Valley AVA with about 72%, 219,838 acres (343.497 sq mi), located in Idaho and the remainder across the border into Washington. The topography consists primarily of deep, V-notched canyons, low plateaus, and bench lands formed by the two rivers. There were 3 wineries within the appellation, as well as 16 commercially-producing vineyards with elevations approximately below 2,000 feet (610 m). Lewis-Clark Valley boundaries forced the realignment of the existing Columbia Valley viticultural area by expanding into its area based on topography, climate and soil conditions. The realignment more accurately separated the terroir differences between the two appellations.

== History ==
The area has tremendous significance in U.S. history and name significance because it was along the Clearwater and then Snake rivers that the Meriwether Lewis and William Clark Expedition traveled, both on their westward exploration in 1805 and on their return in 1806. The east to west reach of the Clearwater River and conjoined Clearwater and Snake rivers within the area is arguably the most significant segment of their continental journey of exploration because it is the home range of the noble Nez Perce Tribe, who offered food and friendship to members of the expedition, and whose tribal headquarters today is at Lapwai within the AVA.
In 1872, vinifera growing in the Northwest originated in the Lewis-Clark Valley. By 1908, 40 varieties of grapes were being cultivated such as Petit Syrah, Petit Verdot and Cabernet Franc. Two years later, the temperance movement in the town of Lewiston ratified a local ban on alcoholic beverages and the industry crashed. Most of the wine was turned into vinegar and viticulture virtually disappeared. Evidence of the area's former winemaking history, including hundreds of acres of abandoned vineyards, can be found throughout the region. In the early 2000s, wine grapes started to make a comeback in the area, and today's Lewis-Clark Valley AVA, as of 2025, includes four wineries, eight grape growers and 100 acres of wine grapes.

== Terroir ==
=== Topography ===
The distinguishing features of the Lewis-Clark AVA include its topography, climate, native vegetation, and soils. The AVA is located at the confluence of the Snake and Clearwater Rivers. The topography of the AVA consists primarily of deep, V-notched canyons, low plateaus, and bench lands formed by the two rivers. Almost none of the AVA consists of broad floodplains typically associated with valley floors, which are susceptible to cold-air pooling that can damage new growth and delay fruit maturation. Elevations within the AVA are below 1,969 feet (600 m). According to the petition, elevations above 1,969 feet (600 m) are generally too cold to support reliable ripening of the varietals of Vitis vinifera (V. vinifera) grapes that are grown within the AVA, and winter freezes can be hard enough to kill dormant vines. By contrast, the regions surrounding the Lewis-Clark Valley AVA to the east, south, southwest, and west are steep, rugged mountains with elevations ranging from approximately 2,000 feet (610 m) to over 6,000 feet (1,829 m). To the north of the AVA are the gently rolling hills of the Palouse high prairie, where the elevations can reach approximately 2,800 feet (853 m).
AVAs owe their existence and the high quality of grapes grown to the position within rain shadows of major mountains. This leads in both cases to semi-desert rainfall amounts of generally less than 20 inches (508 mm) per year and to the use of drip irrigation to control fruit development and ripening. However, the Columbia Valley AVA is in the rain shadow of the huge Cascade Range, whereas the Lewis-Clark Valley is in the rain shadow of the smaller but still significant Blue Mountains uplift.

=== Climate ===
Due to its lower elevations, the climate of the Lewis-Clark Valley is generally warmer than that of the surrounding regions and suitable for growing a variety of grape varietals, including Cabernet Sauvignon, Chardonnay, Merlot, and Cabernet Franc. The warm temperatures of the AVA have earned the region the nickname "banana belt of the Pacific Northwest." Growing degree day (GDD) accumulations within the AVA range from 2,613 to 3,036. GDD accumulations in the surrounding regions are all below 2,000, which is too low for the consistent, successful ripening of most varietals of V. vinifera grapes. The USDA plant hardiness zones range from 6b to 8a.

=== Soils ===
Low shrubs and perennial grasses that have deep masses of fine roots constitute the native vegetation of the Lewis-Clark Valley. The decomposition of these native grasses and their root mats has contributed to the formation of nutrient-rich soils within the AVA. The soils are high in organic materials that promote healthy vine growth. The majority of these soils are classified as Mollisols soils. The Palouse region to the north of the AVA has similar native grasses, but most of the land is used for growing wheat, which is better suited to the cooler climate of the Palouse. To the east, south, and west of the AVA, conifer trees comprise most of the native vegetation. The understories of these forested regions are covered with pine needle litter instead of perennial grasses. The pine needle litter remains on the surface, so the organic material released by the decomposition of the needles does not mix as deeply into the soil as the material released by decaying grass root mats. As a result, the soils of forested regions are not as high in organic material and nutrients as the soils within the AVA. Additionally, the soils to the east, south, and west of the AVA are classified as Andisols soils, which are comprised primarily of ash and other volcanic materials and contain only small amounts of organic material.

== Viticulture Industry ==
Lewis-Clark Valley winemakers are using locally grown grapes to create wines that compete on the national market. After its AVA recognition, the Lewis-Clark Valley, with steep river canyons and plateaus, has the state's lowest elevation vineyards that successfully ripen a wide variety of wine grapes where viniferas were first cultivated in 1872.
