= Idaho wine =

Wine industry in Idaho, United States

Coordinates: 42°40′31″N 114°45′08″W

Idaho
- Wine region
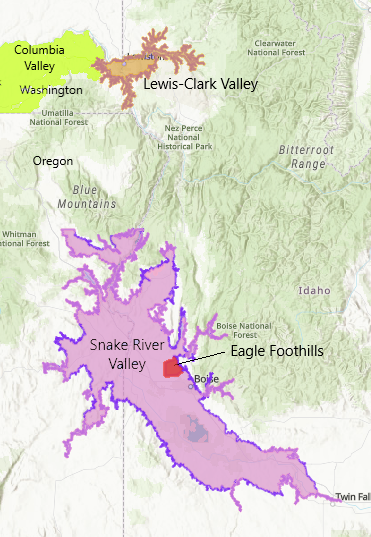
- Official name: State of Idaho
- Type: U.S. State Appellation
- Year established: 1890
- Years of wine industry: 166
- Country: United States
- Sub-regions: Snake River Valley AVA, Eagle Foothills AVA, Lewis-Clark Valley AVA
- Climate region: Continental
- Total area: 52.9 million acres (82,643 sq mi)
- Size of planted vineyards: 1,300 acres (526 ha)
- Grapes produced: Cabernet Franc, Cabernet Sauvignon, Chardonnay, Gewurztraminer, Lemberger, Malbec, Merlot, Muscat Canelli, Orange Muscat, Petit Verdot, Pinot gris, Pinot noir, Riesling, Sauvignon blanc, Semillon, Syrah, Viognier, Zinfandel, Zweigelt
- No. of wineries: 65

Idaho wine refers to wine made from grapes grown in the state of Idaho. State names in the United States automatically qualify as legal appellations of origin for wine produced from grapes grown in that state and do not require registration with the Alcohol and Tobacco Tax and Trade Bureau (TTB) of the Treasury Department. TTB was created in January 2003, when the Bureau of Alcohol, Tobacco and Firearms, or ATF, was extensively reorganized under the provisions of the Homeland Security Act of 2002.
Today, Idaho's viticulture is its fastest growing agricultural industry.

== History ==
Idaho has a long history of wine production with the first vineyards in the Pacific Northwest being planted here in the 1860s. Grapes were first planted in the state by French immigrants Louis Desol and Robert Schleicher, and Jacob Schaefer from Germany before grapes were ever planted in Washington and Oregon. Idaho wines were receiving national recognition before Prohibition crippled the industry and shutdown production. In fact, Idaho issued a state prohibition in 1916 before the 18th Amendment was enacted in 1920 and repealed in 1933. The state’s viticulture industry was not revived until the 1970s when first grape vines were planted in the Snake River Valley toward its southernmost area.

== Terroir ==
Located in the Pacific Northwest, the wine regions of Idaho resembles Eastern Washington though the region is affected by a greater diurnal temperature variation. The average vineyard in Idaho sits at an altitude of 1,800 feet (550 m) among the foothills of the Rocky Mountains. Advancements in viticulture has given winegrowers an understanding to plant vines in warmer localities limiting exposure to Idaho's severe winters which devastated crops during the 1970s and 1980s. In recent years, improved viticultural practices common in Idaho included open canopies over the vines, drip irrigation and aggressive pruning to ensure lower yields.

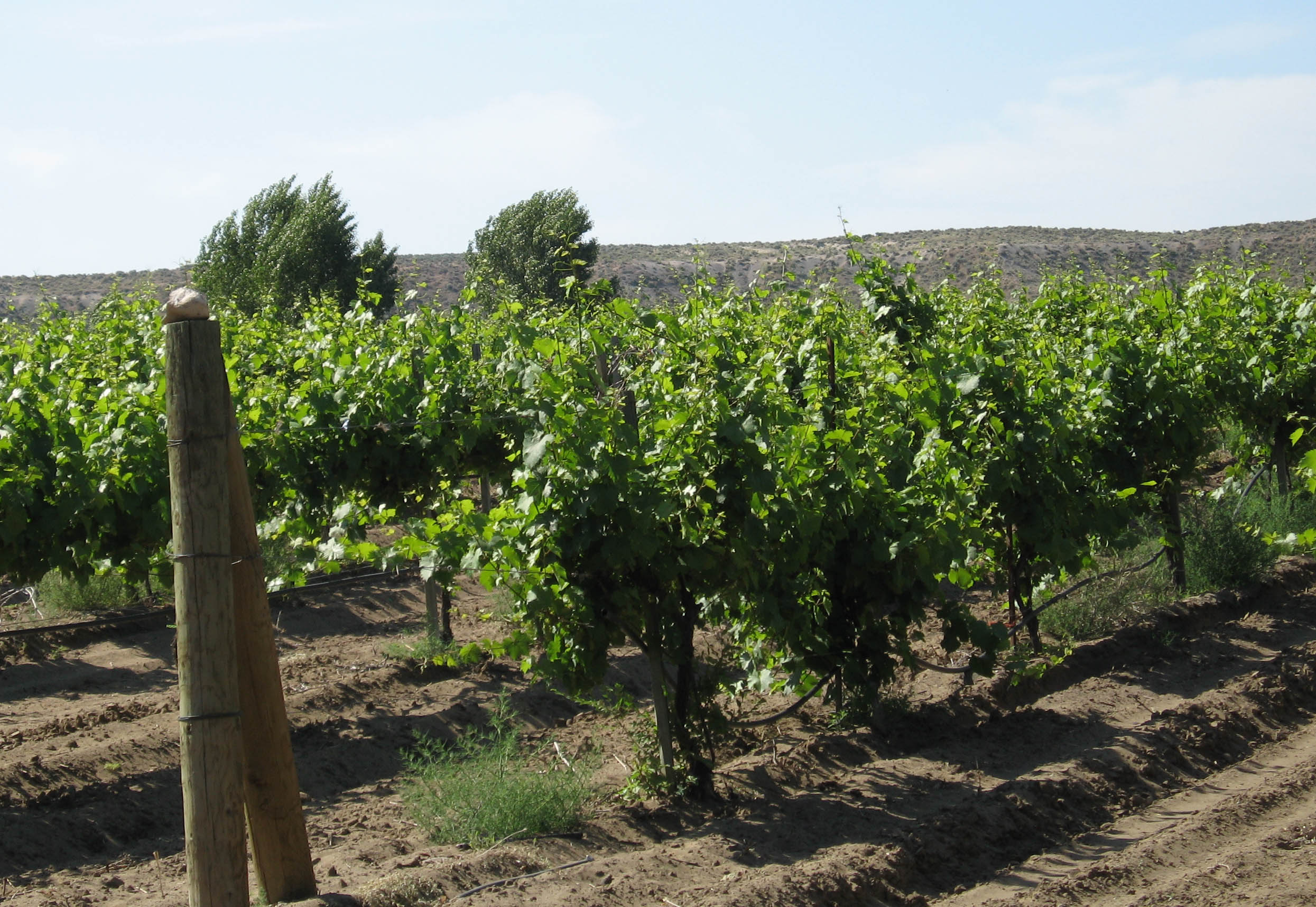
thump

== Grapes ==
Since the 1970s, Idaho wine has been known for its cool climate white varietals like Riesling (including Ice wine), Chenin blanc, Chardonnay and Gewürztraminer. In recent years there have been an increased focus on red wine productions, notably Cabernet Sauvignon, Merlot and Syrah.

=== Grape production ===
In 1999, the Idaho Department of Agriculture reported a total of twenty-three farms producing wine grapes. The farms reported a total of 656 acres (265 ha) in production, which represented 7% of the state total area for fruit production. By the 2006 report, a total of forty-nine farms were included in the census. These operations reported a total of 1,214 acres (491 ha) in production with 843,052 vines of bearing age. This represents a growth of 85.8% over the 1999 survey. Canyon County vineyards contain 81% of the state's total inventory of grape vines. As of 2017, The Idaho Wine Commission reports on about 1300 acres of grapes planted with expansions planned in each of the existing AVAs.

== Wine Industry ==
According to the Idaho Wine Commission, the Gem State is one of the fastest-growing wine regions in the United States. In 2013, Idaho's wine industry had a $169.3 million impact, up from $73 million just five years before. There were 40 wineries in Idaho in 2011, and by 2022 that number increased 75%. There are over 70 wineries in Idaho, with the largest and oldest winery being Snake River Valley's St Chapelle, founded 1975, in Caldwell. The state's economy was boosted $210 million by its wine industry in 2022, and as Idaho keeps growing, so will that number. Vineyards with elevations up to 3,000 feet (914 m) have an extended growing season, similar to Argentina's Uco Valley, home to some of the "world's best" Malbecs. Riesling and Malbec, both are perfectly suited for southern Idaho’s hilly terrain. Rhône varieties such as Syrah, Viognier, Petite Sirah and Grenache-Syrah-Mourvèdre blends also are wines to notice, as well as Petit Verdot and Tempranillo are keys to Idaho viticulture's success.

== Wineries and Viticultural Areas ==
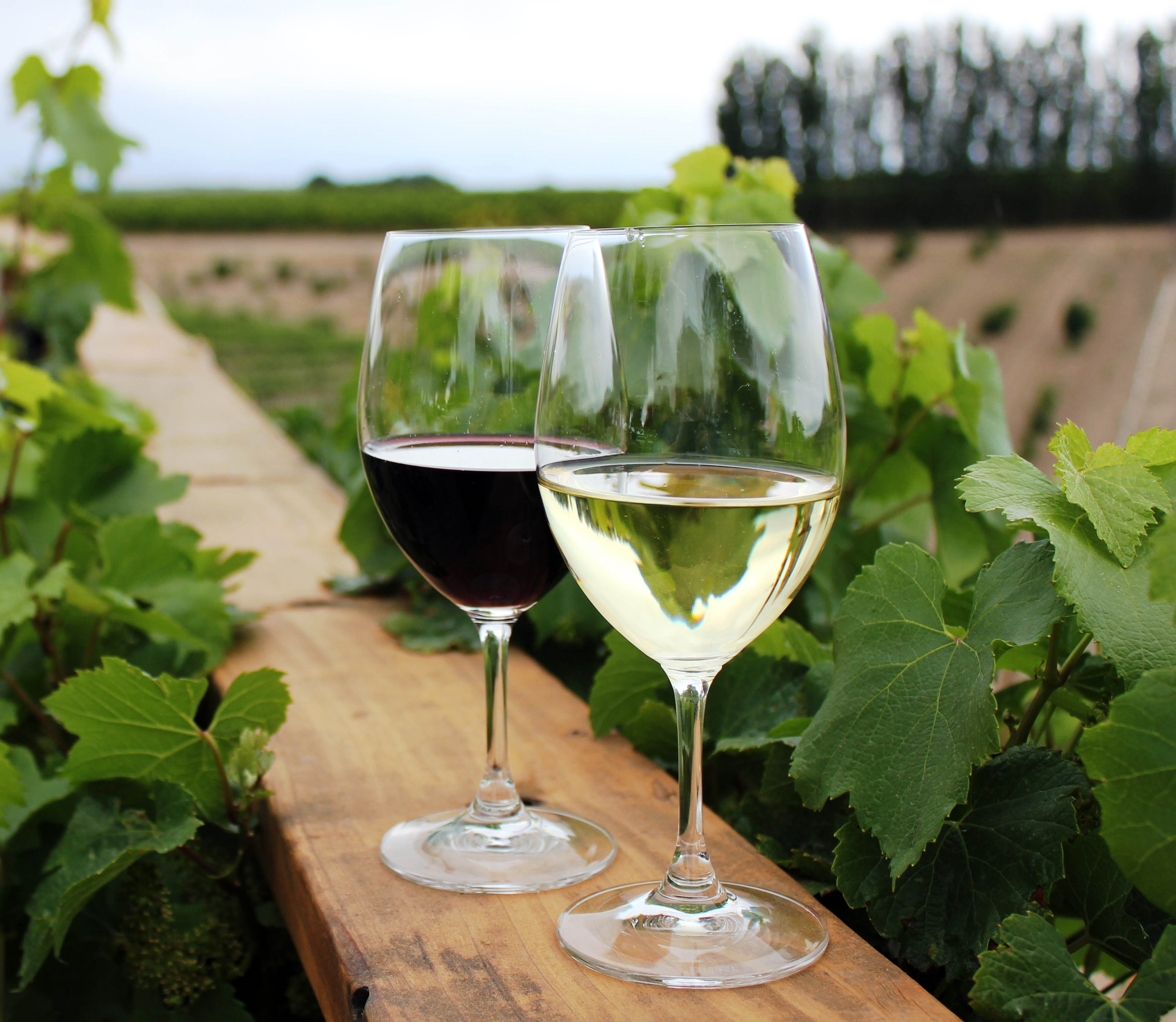

The majority of the state's wineries are located in the Snake River Valley west of Boise. Currently there over 70 wineries in Idaho.

The Snake River Valley lies in southwestern Idaho and two counties in Oregon encompassing 8,263 square miles (5,288,320 acres) and was designated an American Viticultural Area (AVA) by the Alcohol and Tobacco Tax and Trade Bureau (TTB) on April 9, 2007. A petition was filed by the growers in the Snake River Valley, the Idaho Grape Growers and Wine Producers Commission, and the Idaho Department of Commerce and Labor. The AVA was established for wines to bear the Snake River Valley label where at least 85% of the grapes used for production must be grown in the AVA. Vintners may now use the term to describe Idaho and Oregon wines made from grapes grown in the viticultural area.

Eagle Foothills appellation was designated in November 2015. It is credited as a specialized grape-growing region because of the influence of nearby 4,874-foot (1,486 m) Prospect Peak and the granite pebbles mixed with volcanic ash/sandy loam as a result of Ancient Lake Idaho.

Lewis-Clark Valley is also a multi-state AVA located in four northern Idaho counties and three counties in southeastern Washington. It was established as the nation's 235^{th}, Washington's ninth and Idaho's third appellation on April 2016 by the TTB, Treasury after reviewing the petition submitted by Dr. Alan Busacca, a licensed geologist and founder of Vinitas Consultants, LLC, on behalf of the Palouse-Lewis Clark Valley Wine Alliance and the Clearwater Economic Development Association, proposing the viticultural area named "Lewis-Clark Valley." The region encompasses 479 square miles (306,560 acres) with nearly 100 acres (40 ha) under vine throughout the Lewis-Clark Valley between the Clearwater and mid-Snake Rivers and their tributaries. The topography consists primarily of deep, V-notched canyons, low plateaus, and bench lands formed by the two rivers. There were 3 wineries within the appellation, as well as 16 commercially-producing vineyards with elevations approximately below 2,000 feet (610 m). It borders the northern part of the Oregon-Washington established Columbia Valley AVA with about 72%, 219,838 acres (343.497 sq mi), located in Idaho and the remainder across the border into Washington.

== Popular culture ==
Singer Norma Zimmer, who held title of "Champagne Lady" on The Lawrence Welk Show for over two decades, was born in Shoshone County, Idaho.

In the 1969 film Cactus Flower (based on two earlier plays) Ingrid Bergman reads the label of a bottle in a nightclub and says, "I didn't know they made champagne in Idaho." Later in the film, she tells her date, "Let's have some of that crazy Idaho champagne!"

Cloris Leachman delivers a similar line in a 1971 episode of The Mary Tyler Moore Show as Phyllis Lindstrom. When Mary presents a bottle of champagne to celebrate a new job, Phyllis reads the label and says, "I didn't know they even made it in Idaho."

The gag gets extended treatment in The Muppet Movie from 1979, as Kermit the Frog orders a bottle of wine from the waiter (played by Steve Martin) to share with Miss Piggy. When the bottle arrives, Miss Piggy exclaims, "You mad impetuous thing—it's champagne!" to which Martin interjects, "Not exactly. Sparkling muscatel—one of the finest wines of Idaho." Martin later asks Kermit, "Don't you want to smell the bottle cap?" and, when Kermit asks the waiter to taste it for him, Martin dramatically spits it out, and says, "Excellent choice." "Should be, for 95¢," Kermit snarks to Miss Piggy.

== See also ==
- List of wineries in Idaho
