= Canadice (grape) =

Variety of grape

- Grape (Vitis)
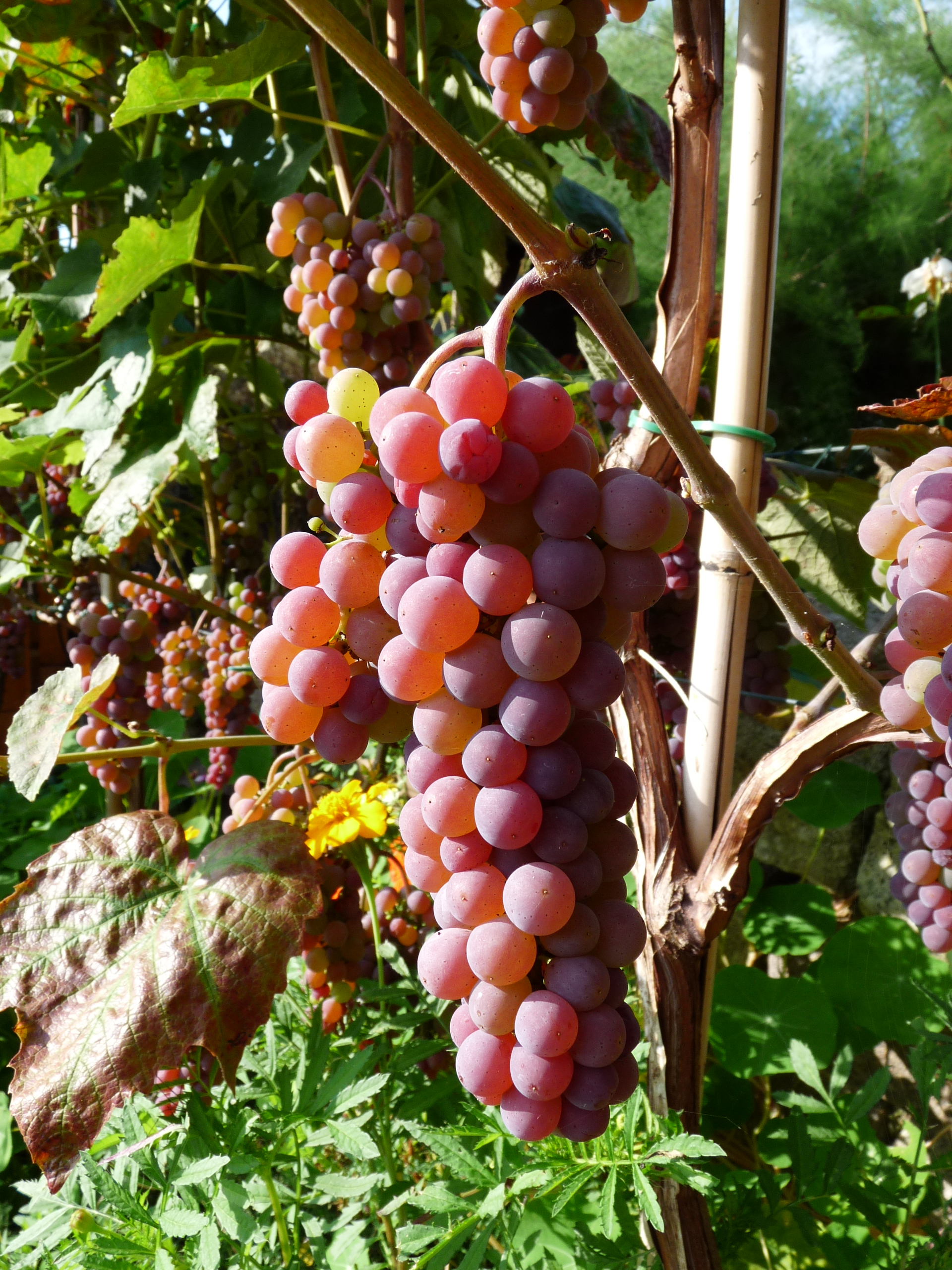
- Species: Vitis vinifera
- Origin: Geneva, New York, USA
- VIVC number: 2035

Canadice is a cultivar of seedless red grape with a bit of a spicy flavor. It is a late season cultivar ripening about mid-September into October and is hardy down to -20 degrees Fahrenheit. It is used as a table grape and is described as productive with a flavor similar to Delaware grapes. Also, these grapes come in large, cylindrical and somewhat compact clusters and are medium in individual size. Negative attributes of this particular grape are that it is highly susceptible or sensitive to black rot as well as moderately susceptible or sensitive to downy mildew and Botrytis. It is also slightly susceptible or sensitive to powdery mildew. However, tests have shown that Canadice grapes will maintain a high quality for up to four months in storage with high post-harvest sulfur dioxide fumigation.

Canadice resulted from a cross of Bath by Himrod and was released by the New York State Agricultural Experiment Station in Geneva, New York, in 1977. Like several other releases from this program, it was named for one of the Finger Lakes, Canadice Lake.
