= Eagle Foothills AVA =

Appellation that designates wine in Gem and Ada Counties, Idaho

Coordinates: 43°49′56″N 116°24′28″W

Eagle Foothills
- Wine region
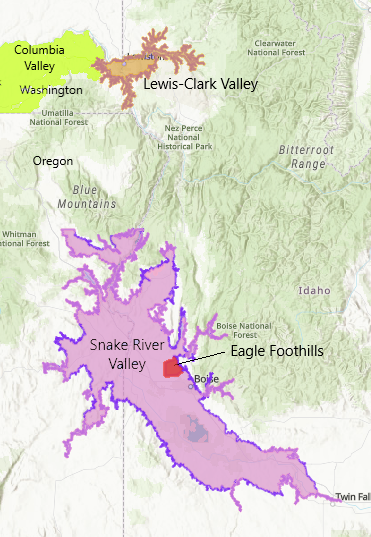
- Type: American Viticultural Area
- Year established: 2015
- Country: United States
- Part of: Idaho, Snake River Valley AVA
- Growing season: 144 days
- Climate region: Region Ib
- Heat units: 2,418 GDD units
- Precipitation (annual average): 14.8 in (375.9 mm)
- Soil conditions: granite, volcanic material mixed with sandy, coarse and stony loams
- Total area: 49,815 acres (77.8 sq mi)
- Size of planted vineyards: 99 acres (40 ha)
- No. of vineyards: 16
- Grapes produced: Cabernet Sauvignon, Cabernet Franc, Chardonnay, Grenache, Merlot, Mourvèdre, Petit Verdot, Pinot Gris, Sauvignon Blanc, Syrah, Riesling, Roussanne and Viognier
- No. of wineries: 1

Eagle Foothills is an American Viticultural Area (AVA) in the state of Idaho located in the southwestern region in Gem and Ada Counties. The area lies southeast of Emmett, north of Eagle and approximately 10 miles (16 km) northwest of the city of Boise. It was established as the nation's 231^{st} and the state's second appellation on November 25, 2015 by the Alcohol and Tobacco Tax and Trade Bureau (TTB), Treasury as the first sub-appellation in the vast Snake River Valley viticultural area and the first appellation entirely within Idaho's state borders. It does not overlap with any existing or proposed AVA.
Eagle Foothills lies at the north bank of Ancient Lake Idaho with its elevations ranging from 2,490 to 3,412 feet (759–1,040 m). The area encompasses 49,815 acres (77.8 sq mi) with nearly 70 acres (28 ha) under vine with plans to add 472 acres (191 ha) and seven vineyards. Vineyard elevations are below 3,000 feet (914 m). The majority of viticulture activity is at 3 Horse Ranch Vineyards with its 46 acres (19 ha) in center of the appellation. The cool climate and relatively short growing season are suitable for growing early to mid-season varietals such as Chardonnay, Pinot Gris and Riesling.

== History ==
The establishment of the multi-state Snake River Valley appellation in 2007 was a watershed moment for the Idaho viticulture. The petition for the Eagle Foothills viticultural area was submitted by Martha and Gary Cunningham, owner of 3 Horse Ranch Vineyards, on behalf of the local grape growers and vintners. Recognition for Eagle Foothills began in 2012 when the Cunninghams evaluated their area as a special microclimate. With the assistance of climate and viticulture specialists, they quantified their region's climate, soil and terrain noting its unique terroir within the vast Snake River Valley appellation and from other potential Idahoan viticulture areas. The appellation petition was submitted in February 2015 originally proposing an AVA named "Willow Creek Idaho." However, TTB determined that the petition did not sufficiently demonstrate that the region is known by that name. According to TTB regulations, AVA names are required to reflect the area's history or geology. Therefore, the petitioner submitted a request to change the proposed name to "Eagle Foothills" which was approved.

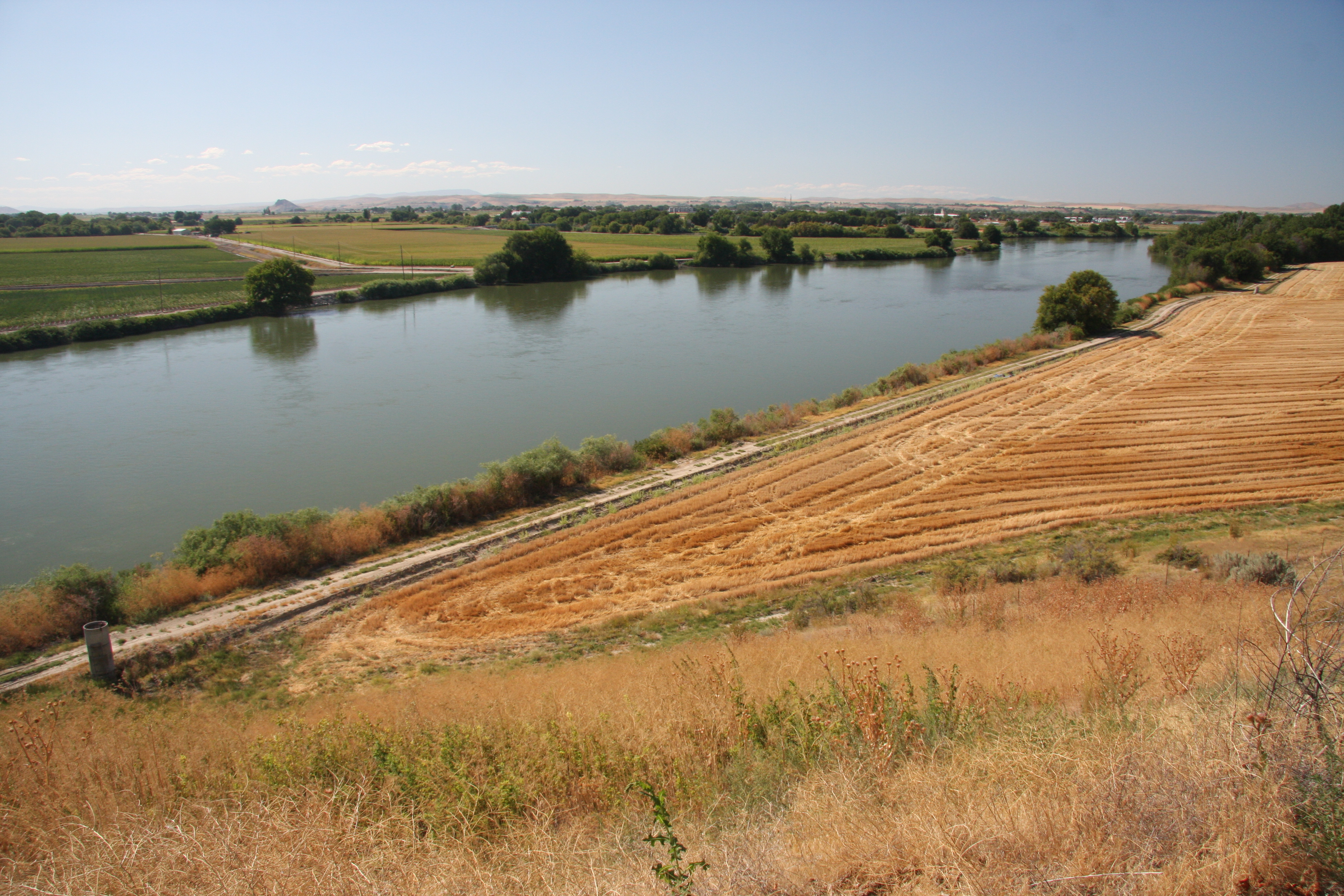
Snake River near Boise

== Terroir ==
According to the petition, the distinguishing features of Eagle Foothills are its topography, climate, and soils. The area is located within the Unwooded Alkaline Foothills ecoregion of Idaho. This ecoregion is defined as an arid, sparsely populated region of rolling foothills, benches, and alluvial fans underlain by alkaline lake bed deposits. A network of seasonal creeks flowing southwesterly through the region have created deep gulches and a rugged terrain that has a variety of slope aspects favorable to viticulture. The presence of the 4,820 feet (1,470 m) Prospect Peak and surrounding elevations contributes to the terroir with the drainage airflow contributing to its unique climate. Weather patterns present a semiarid nature with rolling hillside and grasslands as the surrounding topography. The elevation within the appellation ranges from approximately 2,490 to 3,412 feet (759–1,040 m) with an 2,900 feet (880 m) average. The high elevations enable cold air to drain and pool within the lower surrounding elevations, resulting in fewer damaging frosts. The hills that provide the best vineyard areas are south-facing slopes with afternoon sunshine coupled with evening shade. The annual precipitation is between 11–18 inches (280–460 mm) with aa annual heat summation of 2,418 growing degree days (GDD). The soils are a diverse mixture of sandy, coarse and stony loams predominantly composed of granite and volcanic materials mixed with sedimentary materials from the ancient lake and the Snake River is notable for their large, irregularly shaped, coarse grains. Due to these irregular shapes, "pockets" of oxygen form in the soil, which promote healthy root growth and allow for rapid water drainage. Despite the desert terrain of the Eagle Foothills, water is abundantly provided by the Snake River aquifer. The USDA plant hardiness zone is 7a.

== Unique AVA ==
The TTB determined that the Eagle Foothills will remain within the established Snake River Valley appellation. Eagle Foothills is located along the eastern edge of the Snake River Valley and shares the same broad characteristics, in that both regions are semiarid and have vineyards that are planted on slopes to maximize sunlight exposure and minimize the risk of frost. However, Eagle Foothills receives several more inches of precipitation per year and has a slightly longer growing season. Additionally, the Snake River Valley contains a large variety of diverse soils, unlike Eagle Foothills which has fairly uniform soil characteristics. As Martha Cunningham explained in the petition, "The Sunnyslope deserves its own AVA, too. The Snake River Valley is so vast, and certainly diverse enough, I see no reason for others not to follow."

== Viticulture Industry ==
The Eagle Foothills Grape Growers Association (EFGGA) organization was formed to promote the interests of the local wine grape growing industry focusing on the growing regions in Eagle Foothills. TTB received the petition from Martha Cunningham, owner of the 3 Horse Ranch Vineyards, on behalf of the local grape growers and vintners proposing a viticultural area in Gem and Ada Counties originally named " Willow Creek, Idaho." The petitioner later requested to change the proposed name to "Eagle Foothills."

After careful review of the petition, TTB determined that evidence provided by the petitioner supported the establishment of the Eagle Foothills appellation with expectations that other areas within the expansive Snake River Valley AVA will formulate petitions for their own unique viticulture area. The petition stated plans for 4 acres (1.6 ha) to be added to an existing vineyard with additional 7 commercial vineyards covering approximately 472 acres (191 ha) within the next few years. The cool climate and relatively short growing season are suitable for growing early to mid-season varietals such as Chardonnay, Pinot Gris and Riesling. Many Rhône varieties are grown here, but Merlot has achieved critical acclaim.
