= Garden City, Idaho =

City in Idaho, United States

- City
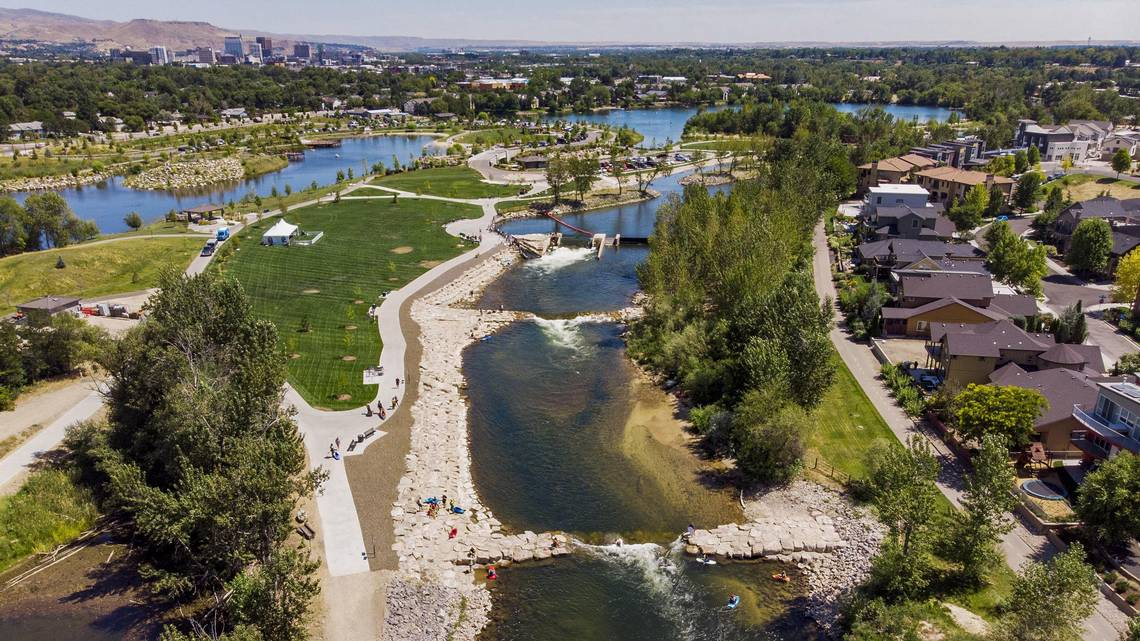
- Garden City as seen with downtown Boise in the background.

- Logo
- Motto: "Nestled By The River"
- Location of Garden City in Ada County, Idaho.

- Location in the United States
- Coordinates: 43°38′44″N 116°15′58″W
- Country: United States
- State: Idaho
- County: Ada

Area
  - Total: 4.27 sq mi (11.07 km^{2})
  - Land: 4.08 sq mi (10.57 km^{2})
  - Water: 0.19 sq mi (0.50 km^{2})
- Elevation: 2,602 ft (793 m)

Population (2020)
  - Total: 12,316
  - Density: 3,020/sq mi (1,165/km^{2})
- Time zone: UTC−7 (Mountain (MST))
  - Summer (DST): UTC−6 (MDT)
- ZIP codes: 83703, 83714
- Area codes: 208, 986
- FIPS code: 16-29620
- GNIS feature ID: 2410567
- Website: gardencityidaho.org

Garden City is a city in Ada County, Idaho. The population was 12,316 at the time of the 2020 census. Garden City is nearly surrounded by Boise but retains a separate municipal government.

Garden City was named for gardens raised by Chinese immigrants who lived in the area. The name of the city's only main street, Chinden Boulevard, is a portmanteau of the words "China" and "garden." In the second decade of the 21st century, it became a haven for artists' studios.

Garden City is part of the Boise metropolitan area.

== Geography ==
According to the United States Census Bureau, the city has a total area of 4.17 square miles (10.80 km^{2}), of which 4.04 square miles (10.46 km^{2}) is land and 0.13 square miles (0.34 km^{2}) is water.

Expo Idaho, which hosts the Western Idaho Fair, is part of unincorporated Ada County but the city limits completely surround the complex. In 2017, Mayor John Evans proposed that Garden City annex the enclave in order to develop a downtown area.

== Demographics ==
Historical population
Census	Pop.	Note	%±
1950	764		—
1960	1,681		120.0%
1970	2,368		40.9%
1980	4,571		93.0%
1990	6,369		39.3%
2000	10,624		66.8%
2010	10,972		3.3%
2020	12,316		12.2%
U.S. Decennial Census

=== 2020 census ===
As of the 2020 census, Garden City had a population of 12,316. The median age was 47.0 years. 16.9% of residents were under the age of 18 and 26.4% of residents were 65 years of age or older. For every 100 females there were 92.1 males, and for every 100 females age 18 and over there were 90.5 males age 18 and over.

100.0% of residents lived in urban areas, while 0.0% lived in rural areas.

There were 5,585 households in Garden City, of which 21.4% had children under the age of 18 living in them. Of all households, 40.2% were married-couple households, 21.5% were households with a male householder and no spouse or partner present, and 30.1% were households with a female householder and no spouse or partner present. About 33.1% of all households were made up of individuals and 16.8% had someone living alone who was 65 years of age or older.

There were 5,927 housing units, of which 5.8% were vacant. The homeowner vacancy rate was 0.9% and the rental vacancy rate was 5.0%.

Racial composition as of the 2020 census
Race	Number	Percent
White	9,948	80.8%
Black or African American	163	1.3%
American Indian and Alaska Native	112	0.9%
Asian	148	1.2%
Native Hawaiian and Other Pacific Islander	27	0.2%
Some other race	768	6.2%
Two or more races	1,150	9.3%
Hispanic or Latino (of any race)	1,599	13.0%

=== 2010 census ===
At the 2010 census there were 10,972 people, 4,878 households, and 2,849 families living in the city. The population density was 2,715.8 inhabitants per square mile (1,048.6/km^{2}). There were 5,429 housing units at an average density of 1,343.8 per square mile (518.8/km^{2}). The racial makeup of the city was 86.2% White, 1.0% African American, 1.1% Native American, 1.4% Asian, 0.1% Pacific Islander, 7.1% from other races, and 3.1% from two or more races. Hispanic or Latino of any race were 13.8%.

Of the 4,878 households 24.6% had children under the age of 18 living with them, 42.3% were married couples living together, 11.2% had a female householder with no husband present, 4.9% had a male householder with no wife present, and 41.6% were non-families. 34.0% of households were one person and 14.5% were one person aged 65 or older. The average household size was 2.22 and the average family size was 2.81.

The median age was 43.2 years. 20.6% of residents were under the age of 18; 8.9% were between the ages of 18 and 24; 22.3% were from 25 to 44; 29.2% were from 45 to 64; and 18.8% were 65 or older. The gender makeup of the city was 48.4% male and 51.6% female.

=== 2000 census ===
At the 2000 census there were 10,624 people, 4,331 households, and 2,784 families living in the city. The population density was 2,559.9 per square mile. There were 4,590 housing units at an average density of 1,106.0 per square mile. The racial makeup of the city was 89.3% White, 0.5% African American, 0.9% Native American, 1.4% Asian, 0.1% Pacific Islander, 4.9% from other races, and 2.9% from two or more races. Hispanic or Latino of any race were 9.6%.

Of the 4,331 households 29.8% had children under the age of 18 living with them, 47.7% were married couples living together, 10.9% had a female householder with no husband present, and 35.7% were non-families. 27% of households were one person and 8.3% were one person aged 65 or older. The average household size was 2.43 and the average family size was 2.91.

The age distribution was 24.3% under the age of 18, 10.8% from 18 to 24, 29.9% from 25 to 44, 22.6% from 45 to 64, and 12.5% 65 or older. The median age was 35 years. For every 100 females, there were 103.1 males. For every 100 females age 18 and over, there were 101.3 males.

The median household income was $38,520 and the median family income was $46,463. Males had a median income of $30,499 versus $28,315 for females. The per capita income for the city was $24,242. About 9.8% of families and 12.7% of the population were below the poverty line, including 16.6% of those under age 18 and 4.0% of those age 65 or over.

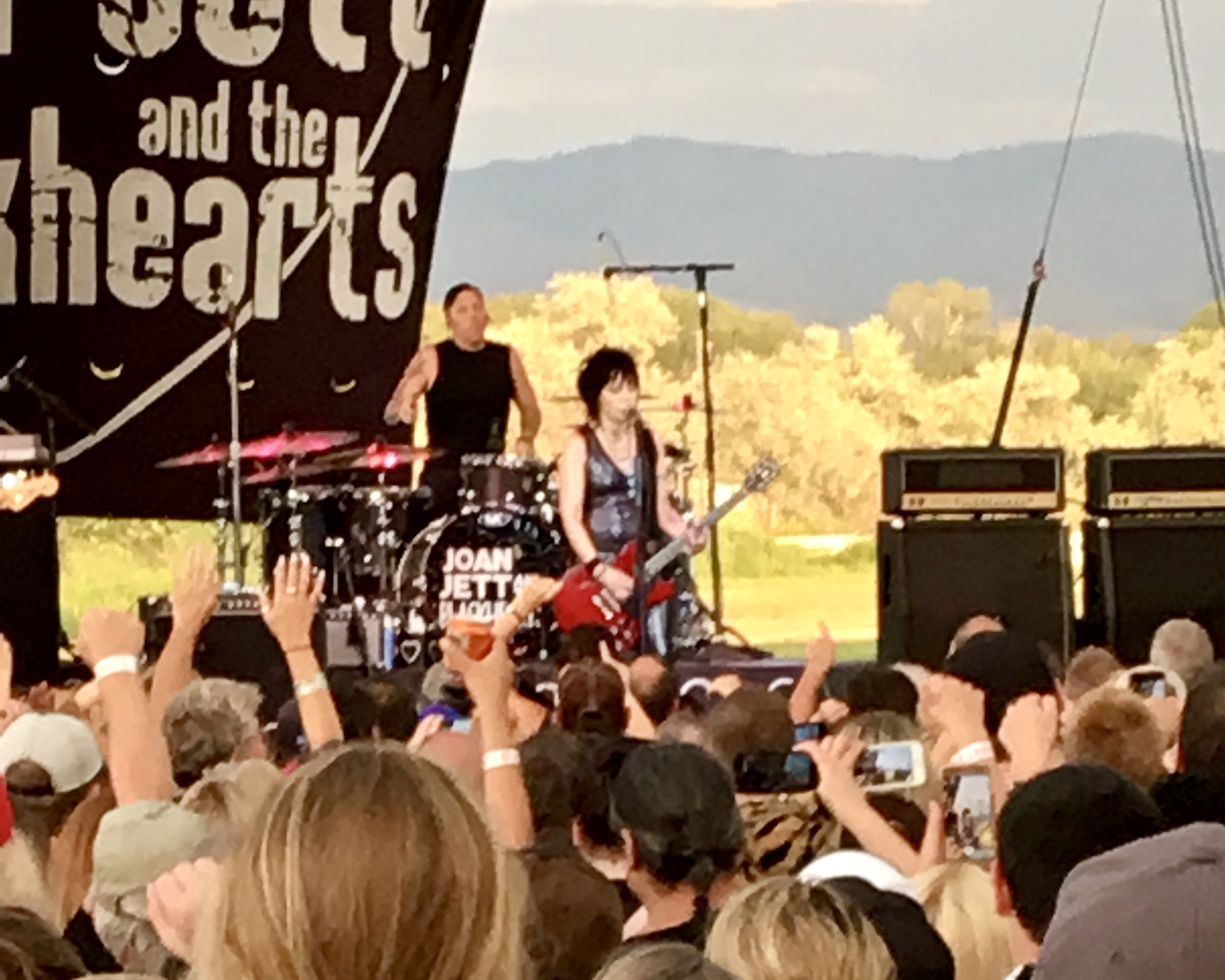
Joan Jett concert at the nearby Expo Idaho, 2017

== Education ==
Most of Garden City is in Boise School District. A portion is in the West Ada School District (Meridian Joint School District 2).

The Boise School District portion is zoned as follows:

- Elementary schools: Madison/Whittier, Mountain View, Pierce Park, Shadow Hills
- Part in North Middle School, part in Riverglen Middle School
- Part in Boise High School, part in Capital High School

== See also ==
- History of Chinese Americans in Idaho
- List of cities in Idaho
- Surel's Place – an artist in residency program located in Garden City
