= Canadice Lake =

Lake in Ontario County, New York, United States

- Skaneadice (Seneca)
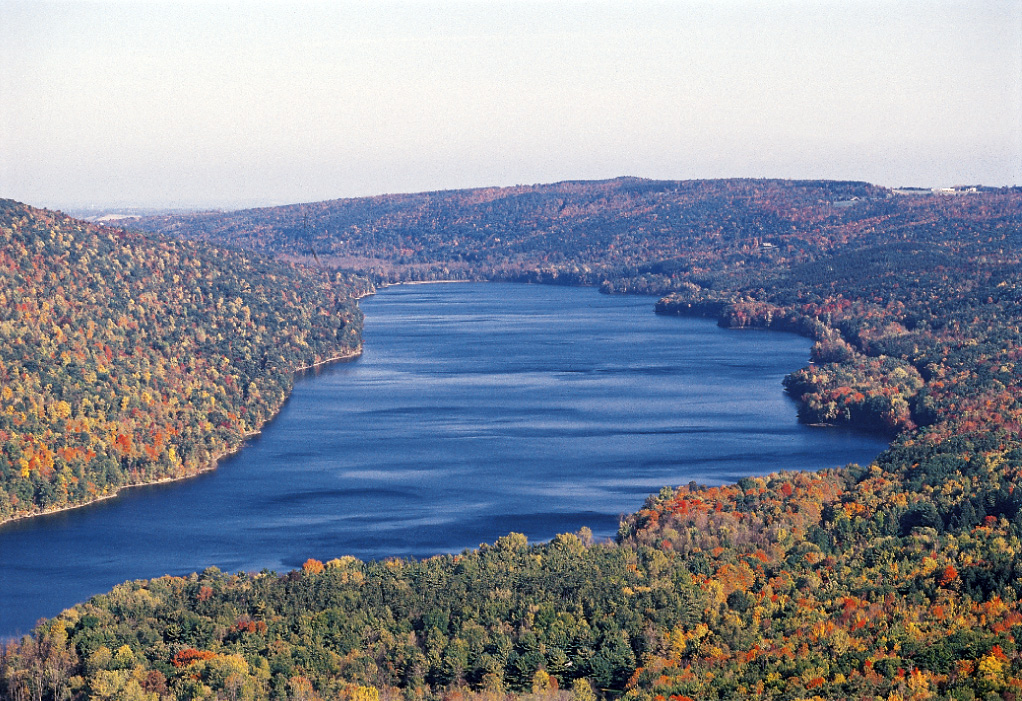
- Aerial view of Canadice Lake in fall 2006

- Location within New York Canadice Lake (the United States)
- Location: Canadice, New York
- Group: Finger Lakes
- Coordinates: 42°43′00″N 77°34′04″W
- Type: Ground moraine
- Primary outflows: Canadice Outlet
- Basin countries: United States
- Max. length: 3 mi (4.8 km)
- Max. width: 0.3 mi (0.48 km)
- Surface area: 649 acres (2.63 km^{2})
- Average depth: 55 ft (17 m)
- Max. depth: 95 ft (29 m)
- Water volume: .011 cu mi (0.046 km^{3})
- Shore length^{1}: 6.5 mi (10.5 km)
- Surface elevation: 1,096 ft (334 m)
- ^{1} Shore length is not a well-defined measure.

The eleven Finger Lakes of New York State.

Canadice Lake /ˈkænədaɪs/ is a Finger Lake in Ontario County in western New York, approximately 30 miles (48 km) south of Rochester. It is the smallest of the Finger Lakes. The name is derived from the Seneca word ska-ne-a-dice, meaning long lake. The lake is part of the Genesee River watershed.

== Description ==
Canadice Lake is three miles (4.8 km) long and 0.3 miles (0.48 km) wide at its widest point. The lake has a surface area of 649 acres (2.63 km^{2}) and a maximum depth of 95 feet (29 m). The lake drains out into Canadice Outlet, which merges with water from the neighboring Hemlock Lake.

In 1873, the city of Rochester, New York, was authorized to begin using the lake as a source of drinking water along with Hemlock Lake. A legal dispute with residents near the lake was resolved in favor of the city in 1886, and a conduit line was constructed which brought water from the lake to the city beginning in 1919. A treatment plant for the lake's water was opened in 1993.

== Recreation ==
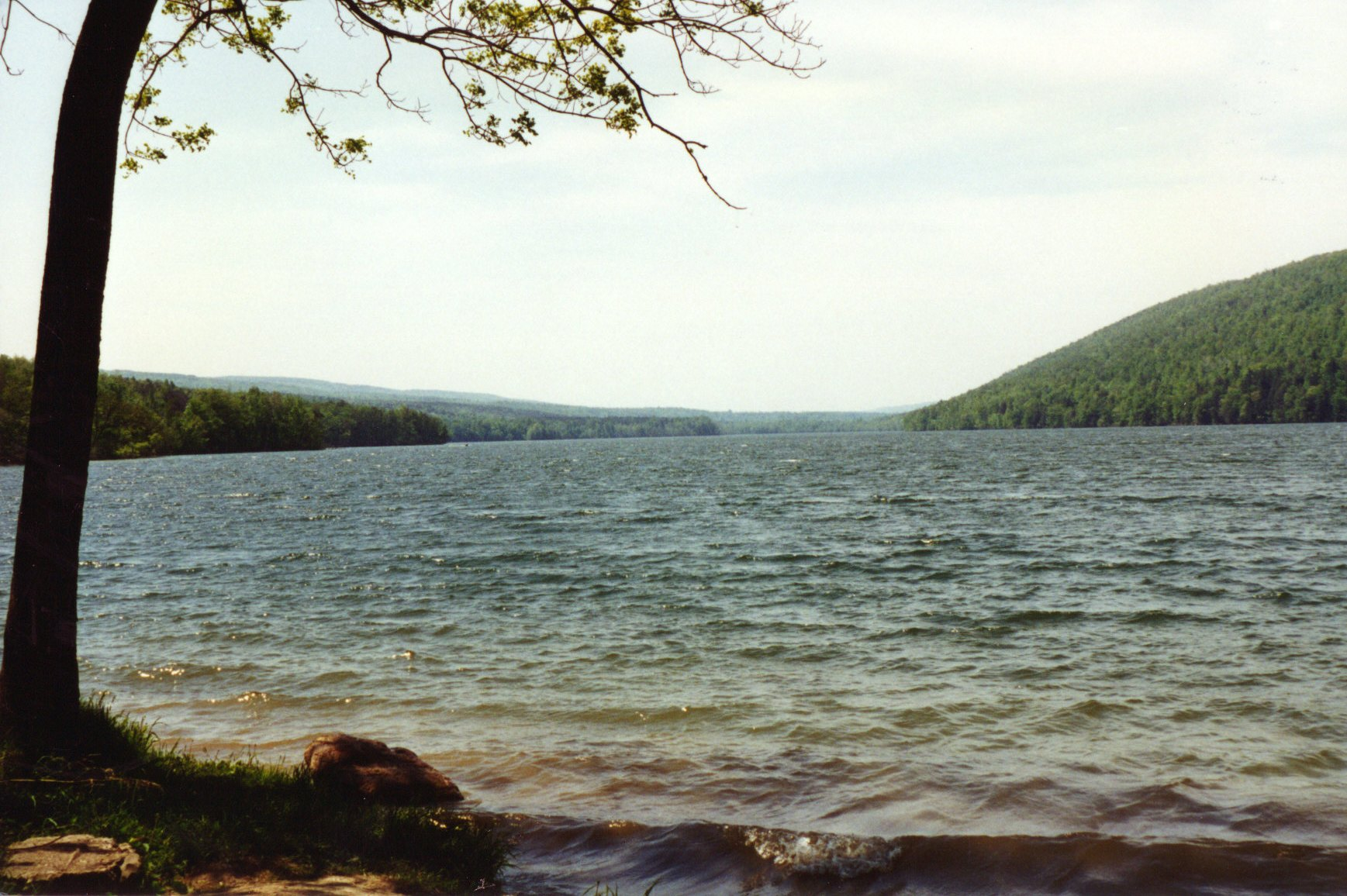
Canadice Lake in 1997

Most of the lakeshore is part of the Hemlock-Canadice State Forest. The lake is still used as a water source for Rochester today. To protect the water quality, no houses are permitted on its shore and boats are limited to 17 feet (5.2 m) in length and engines of 10-horsepower or less. Swimming, camping and contamination of the water are prohibited. Previously, a free permit was required to fish or boat on the lake, but that system has been discontinued and permits are no longer required.

Canadice Lake features several trout species for recreational fishing, including lake trout, brown trout and rainbow trout that are stocked annually by the New York State Department of Environmental Conservation. Landlocked Atlantic salmon are occasionally stocked as well.

An unimproved gravel boat ramp is available for launching boats on the lake's east side, and a cartop launch is available at the south end of the lake.
