= Snake River Valley AVA =

Viticultural area in Idaho and Oregon, USA

Coordinates: 43°34′37″N 116°46′36″W

Snake River Valley
- Wine region
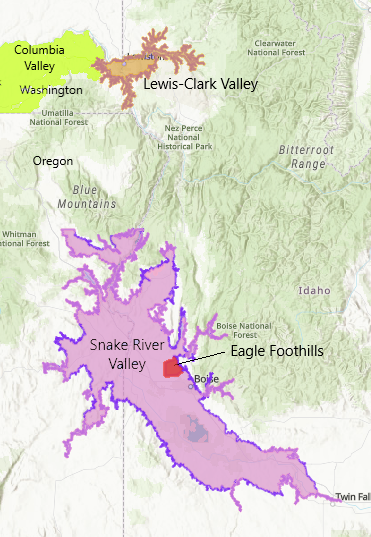
- Type: American Viticultural Area
- Year established: 2007
- Years of wine industry: 162
- Country: United States
- Part of: Idaho, Oregon
- Sub-regions: Eagle Foothills AVA
- Climate region: Region I; Continental and maritime, semiarid desert
- Heat units: 1475–1515 GDD units
- Precipitation (annual average): 10–12 inches (254–305 mm)
- Soil conditions: Surface loess, sand, and flood-deposited silt
- Total area: 5.29 million acres (8,263 sq mi)
- Size of planted vineyards: 1,800 acres (728 ha)
- No. of vineyards: 46
- Grapes produced: Barbera, Cabernet Franc, Cabernet Sauvignon, Canadice, Chardonnay, Cinsault, Gewurztraminer, Grenache, Lemberger, Malbec, Merlot, Mourvedre/Mataro, Petite Sirah, Petit Verdot, Pinot Gris / Grigio, Pinot Noir, Riesling, Roussanne, Semillon, Souzao, Syrah/Shiraz, Tempranillo/Valdepenas, Viognier
- No. of wineries: 27

Snake River Valley is an American Viticultural Area (AVA) located in southwestern Idaho and two counties in eastern Oregon. It was established as the nation's 187th and the state's initial appellation on March 9, 2007, by the Alcohol and Tobacco Tax and Trade Bureau (TTB), Treasury after reviewing the petition submitted by Idahoan vintners of the Snake River Valley, the Idaho Grape Growers and Wine Producers Commission, and the Idaho Department of Commerce and Labor, collectively acting as "petitioner" to establish the 8,263 square miles (5,288,320 acres) viticultural area named "Snake River Valley."

For wines to bear the "Snake River Valley" label, at least 85% of the grapes used for production must be grown in the designated area, which includes the southwestern Idaho counties of Ada, Adams, Boise, Canyon, Elmore, Gem, Gooding, Jerome, Owyhee, Payette, Twin Falls, and Washington, and the Eastern Oregon counties of Malheur and Baker. At the outset, the vast 5.29-million-acre (8,263 sq mi) appellation was resident to 15 wineries and 46 vineyards with 1,800 acres (728 ha) under vine.

== History ==
Idaho was resident to the first wineries in the Pacific Northwest in the 1800s. Vitis vinifera were first planted in the state by French immigrants Louis Desol and Robert Schleicher, and Jacob Schaefer from Germany before grapes were ever planted in Washington and Oregon. Idaho viticulture flourished after the passage of the Homestead Act of 1862, granting tracts of land to farmers in sparsely populated western territories. As a result, Idaho wines received awards and gained national recognition before Prohibition crippled the industry and shutdown production. In fact, Idaho issued a state prohibition in 1916 before the 18th Amendment was enacted in 1920 and repealed in 1933. The state's viticulture industry was not revived until the 1970s when grape vines were planted in the Snake River Valley toward the southern part of the state.

== Terroir ==
=== Topography ===
The ancient Lake Idaho is the physical focus and an important distinguishing feature of the Snake River Valley viticultural area. Ancient Lake Idaho was a trough-like structure of deep lakes that filled the western part of the Snake River Valley, also known as "Snake River Plain", approximately 4 million years ago. The Snake River Plain, a crescent-shaped belt of lava and sediment ranging from 40 to 62 miles (64–100 km) wide, extends about 372 miles (599 km) in length across southern Idaho. The geology of the western portion of the Snake River Plain has lower elevations and a rift-bounded basin, which contrast to the higher elevations of the eastern section of the Snake River Plain. Also, according to the petitioner, the colder and drier climate of the eastern area is not conducive to successful viticulture, unlike the warmer weather and lower elevations of ancient Lake Idaho. The geologic history of the Snake River Valley viticultural area includes flood basalts, northwest-trending structures, loess mantles, and outburst floods. The ancient Lake Idaho extends 149 miles (240 km) northwest to southeast as a system of lakes and flood plains, from the Oregon-Idaho State line to west of Twin Falls, Idaho. North of the Snake River Valley viticultural area boundary line, the petitioner explains, are Cretaceous granites of the Idaho Batholith, Eocene volcanoes, older sedimentary rocks, and volcanic flows. The Snake River Valley viticultural area boundary encircles the now dry, ancient Lake Idaho, a low elevation, fault-bounded, rift basin with a relatively flat, sedimentary bottom. To the south of the boundary line, volcanic rocks overlie the southern extension of the granite basement.

The surrounding areas have a mountainous topography with generally higher elevations. Lower elevations, between 2,165 and 3,412 feet (660–1,040 m) when compared to the surrounding mountains and the eastern portion, is a significant distinguishing feature of the Snake River Valley viticultural area, as shown on the United States Geological Survey (USGS) maps and described by the petition. Oxbow Dam, along the Snake River in Adams County, Idaho, lies at an elevation 2,165 feet (660 m), but the encircling viticultural area boundary line generally adheres to an elevation 3,412 feet (1,040 m), according to the boundary outlined in the petition. The boundary line deviates from its prescribed 3,412 feet (1,040 m) elevation twice at the northernmost boundary on the McCall map and again along the western boundary of the Vale map. The petitioner explains that the 3,412 feet (1,040 m) contour line, past the boundaries of the McCall and Vale maps, continues into regions not associated with the Snake River Valley or with viticulture. The region's viticulture, according to the petitioner, is successful between elevations of 2,180 and 3,117 feet (664–950 m). Mountains surrounding the western Snake River Valley region exceed 7,000 feet (2,134 m), especially to the east of the viticultural area boundary line in the Boise National Forest, as shown on the Idaho City, Idaho, USGS map. The City of Twin Falls, Idaho, about 2.5 miles (4 km) southeast of the Snake River Valley viticultural area's eastern boundary line, as shown on the USGS Twin Falls, Idaho, map, lies at an elevation of 3,729 feet (1,137 m), or about 320 feet (98 m) higher than the elevation of the viticultural area boundary line. The petitioner provided three topographic profiles of the Snake River Valley viticultural area drawn from various points of the compass. The three profiles include (1) California Mountain, Oregon, to Bruneau, Idaho, (2) Oreana, Idaho, to Danskin Peak, Idaho, and (3) Marsing, Idaho, to Emmett, Idaho. The profiles show the lower elevations of the ancient Lake Idaho basin in comparison to the surrounding higher mountain elevations beyond the viticultural area boundary line. Payette, Idaho, is at an elevation of about 2,300 feet (701 m) in the basin, but California Mountain, Oregon, reaches a height of approximately 5,150 feet (1,570 m), significantly higher than the viticultural area boundary lines.

=== Climate ===
The distinguishing climatic features of the Snake River Valley viticultural area, include precipitation, air temperature, heat-unit accumulation, and growing season length. The factors affecting climate include the region's topography, a basin depression with surrounding mountainous terrain; the continental inland location approximately 310 miles (499 km) east of the Cascade Range; and the 43 degree north latitude line. The petitioner adds that the Snake River Valley viticultural area is in a climatic transition zone with both continental and maritime regimes. The combination of elevation and latitude of the Snake River Valley viticultural area creates a shorter grape-growing season than those in many other viticultural regions in the Western United States. Climatic data from four weather stations in the West Snake River Valley (WSRV) and for other grape-growing districts in the Western United States are noted in the climatic data table below. The petitioner used online data from 1971 to 2000 compiled and archived by the National Climatic Data Center (NCDC) and National Oceanic and Atmospheric Administration, for four areas within the Snake River Valley viticultural area and for three viticultural regions outside of Idaho. The petition averaged the collected data for the four Idaho weather stations listed in the climatic data table below. The data are listed separately in the table for each station outside of Idaho, including Umpqua Valley, Oregon; Walla Walla Valley, Washington; and Napa Valley, California, all of which are within established American Viticultural Areas. The USDA plant hardiness zones range from 5b to 8a.

==== Precipitation ====
Snake River Valley is a semiarid desert with minimal summer precipitation. The viticultural area has a mean annual precipitation of 10 to 12 inches (250–300 mm), occurring mostly in winter. The low precipitation rate combines with warm weather during the growing season, and the vineyards, therefore, need irrigation. According to the petitioner, the Idaho weather stations within the Snake River Valley viticultural area record about half the annual precipitation of the weather stations at Umpqua Valley, Oregon; Walla Walla Valley, Washington; and Napa Valley, California. The petitioner explains the lower annual precipitation of Snake River Valley viticultural area may be partially due to the rain shadows of the Cascade, Sierra Nevada, and Owyhee Ranges.

==== Temperature ====
The Snake River Valley viticultural area's mean annual temperature, based on an average of the four Idaho stations monitored, is 51 °F (11 °C), or 10.8 °F (−11.8 °C). The mid-winter mean temperatures are below 32 °F (0 °C) for several months, and potential vineyard damage is a hazard, the petitioner explains. The California, Oregon, and Washington weather stations listed in the climatic data table above record warmer average winter temperatures. The differences in the extreme winter temperatures and the mean annual temperature ranges between the Snake River Valley viticultural area and the three weather stations monitored in California, Oregon, and Washington show significant variations in viticultural growing conditions. The petitioner explains that the difference in winter temperatures between the colder Snake River Valley viticultural area and the stations at Umpqua Valley, Oregon; Walla Walla Valley, Washington; and Napa Valley, California, results, to a great extent, from the higher elevations in the viticultural area, which are between 2,165 to 3,412 feet (660–1,040 m). Elevations of the other stations are Umpqua Valley, about 40 feet (12 m); Walla Walla Valley, 1,200 feet (366 m); and Napa Valley, 460 feet (140 m). Also, distances from the Pacific Ocean affect the amount of moderating, marine air temperatures the seven weather stations receive. Oceans tend to moderate air temperatures over land; hence, a wider annual temperature range indicates a greater degree of continental influence, or distance from an ocean. The Snake River Valley viticultural area and the Walla Walla Valley both have, as a measure of continental influence, mean annual temperature ranges of about 77 °F (25 °C). In comparison, the Umpqua Valley and the Napa Valley, both of which are closer to the Pacific Ocean and are at low elevations, have a smaller mean annual temperature range—about 59 °F (15 °C). The temperatures of Snake River Valley viticultural area, according to the petitioner, rise rapidly during the growing season, from June through August. The Umpqua Valley in Oregon and the Snake River Valley viticultural area have similar, annual, total growing degree-days, as shown in the climatic data table above; but, they have between 200 and 250 fewer heat units than the Walla Walla Valley, Washington, and the Napa Valley, California. Each degree that a day's mean temperature is above 50 °F (10 °C), which is the minimum temperature required for grapevine growth, is counted as 1 degree-day. The length of the Snake River Valley viticultural area's growing season correlates to the frost-free period from about May 10 to September 29 annually, according to the petitioner. The total measurement of annual viticultural growth is between 64 and 117 days less than that measured at Walla Walla Valley, Washington; Umpqua Valley, Oregon; and Napa Valley, California.

Located on the same latitude as Oregon's Umpqua Valley AVA, the Snake River Valley has a more drastic diurnal temperature variation than other appellations in the Pacific Northwest due to the high elevation of most of the appellation's vineyards. At elevations of 2,500 to 3,000 feet (760–910 m) above sea level, the region's is also more than 400 miles (640 km) from the tempering effects of the Pacific Ocean.

=== Soil ===
The soils of the Snake River Valley viticultural area are described as being diverse and not a distinguishing feature, because the soils have developed in various parent materials, during various time frames, and under varying climatic conditions. The soils are broadly classified as Aridisols, the petitioner adds, and no single soil series or association is dominant. Vineyards within the Snake River Valley viticultural area are on soils that have underlying parent material derived from weathered sediment from the ancient Lake Idaho, according to the petition. At the surface are loess, sand, and, in slack water areas, flood-deposited silt. Typically, slope vineyards in the area are on very shallow soils.

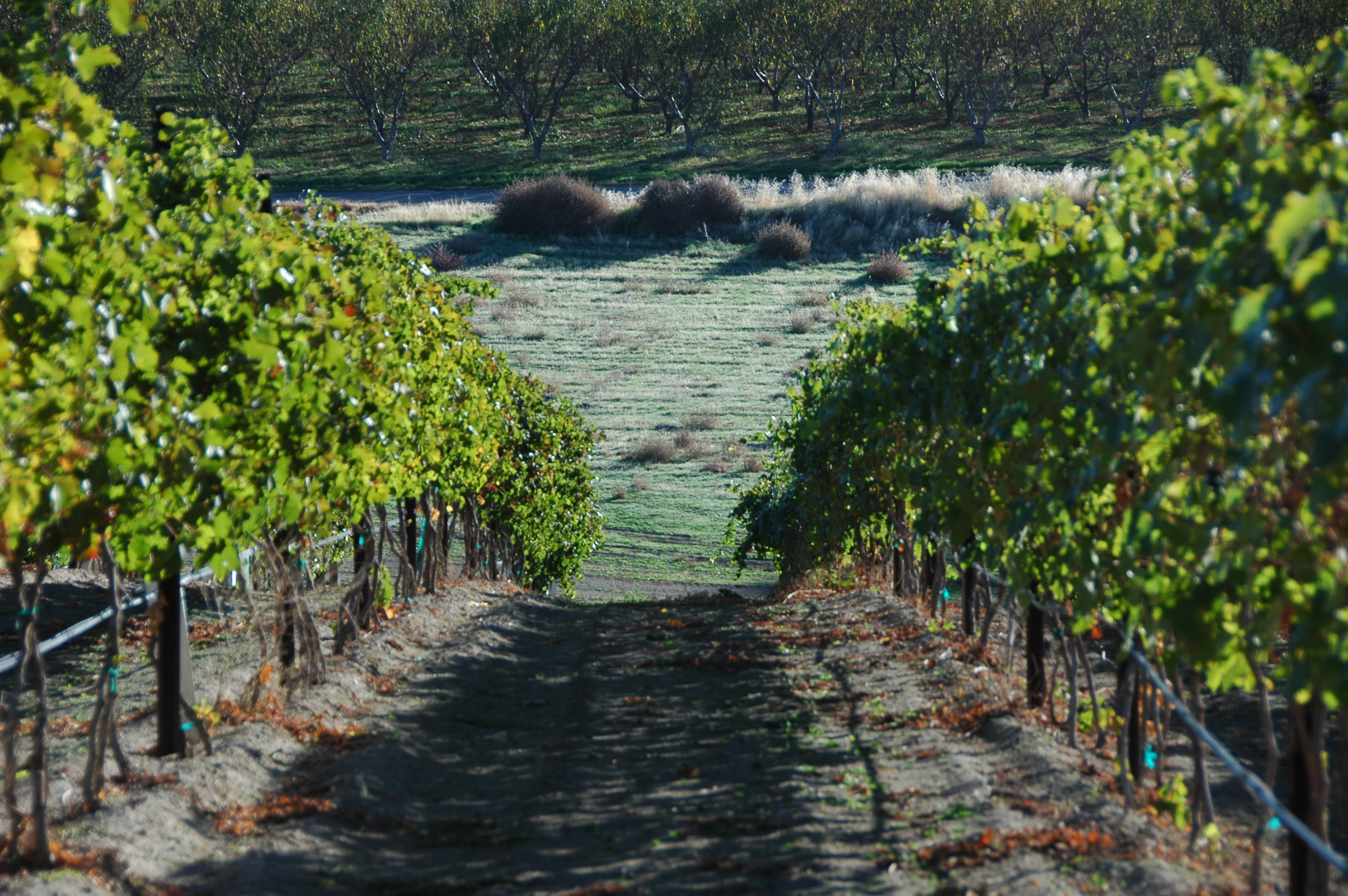
Snake River Valley vineyard

== Wine Industry ==
According to the Idaho Wine Commission, the Gem State is one of the fastest-growing wine regions in the United States. In 2013, Idaho's wine industry had a $169.3 million impact, up from $73 million just five years before. There were 40 wineries in Idaho in 2011, and by 2022 that number increased 75%. There are over 70 wineries in Idaho, with the largest and oldest winery being Snake River Valley's St Chapelle, founded 1975, in Caldwell. The state's economy was boosted $210 million by its wine industry in 2022, and as Idaho keeps growing, so will that number. Vineyards with elevations up to 3,000 feet (914 m) have an extended growing season, similar to Argentina's Uco Valley, home to some of the "world's best" Malbecs. Riesling and Malbec, both are perfectly suited for southern Idaho's hilly terrain. Rhône varieties such as Syrah, Viognier, Petite Sirah and Grenache-Syrah-Mourvèdre blends also are wines to notice, as well as Petit Verdot and Tempranillo are keys to Idaho viticulture's success.
