= Warm air intake (disambiguation) =

Warm air intake is a system to reduce mass flow by reducing inlet density with heating, thus reducing mass flow for the same volume.

Warm air intake may also refer to:

- Heated air inlet, a commonplace system to improve winter cold starting, pre-heating inlet air, by passing it around the exhaust manifold
- Short ram air intake, a form of aftermarket air intake for automobiles with internal combustion engines
