= Chevrolet Camaro (sixth generation) =

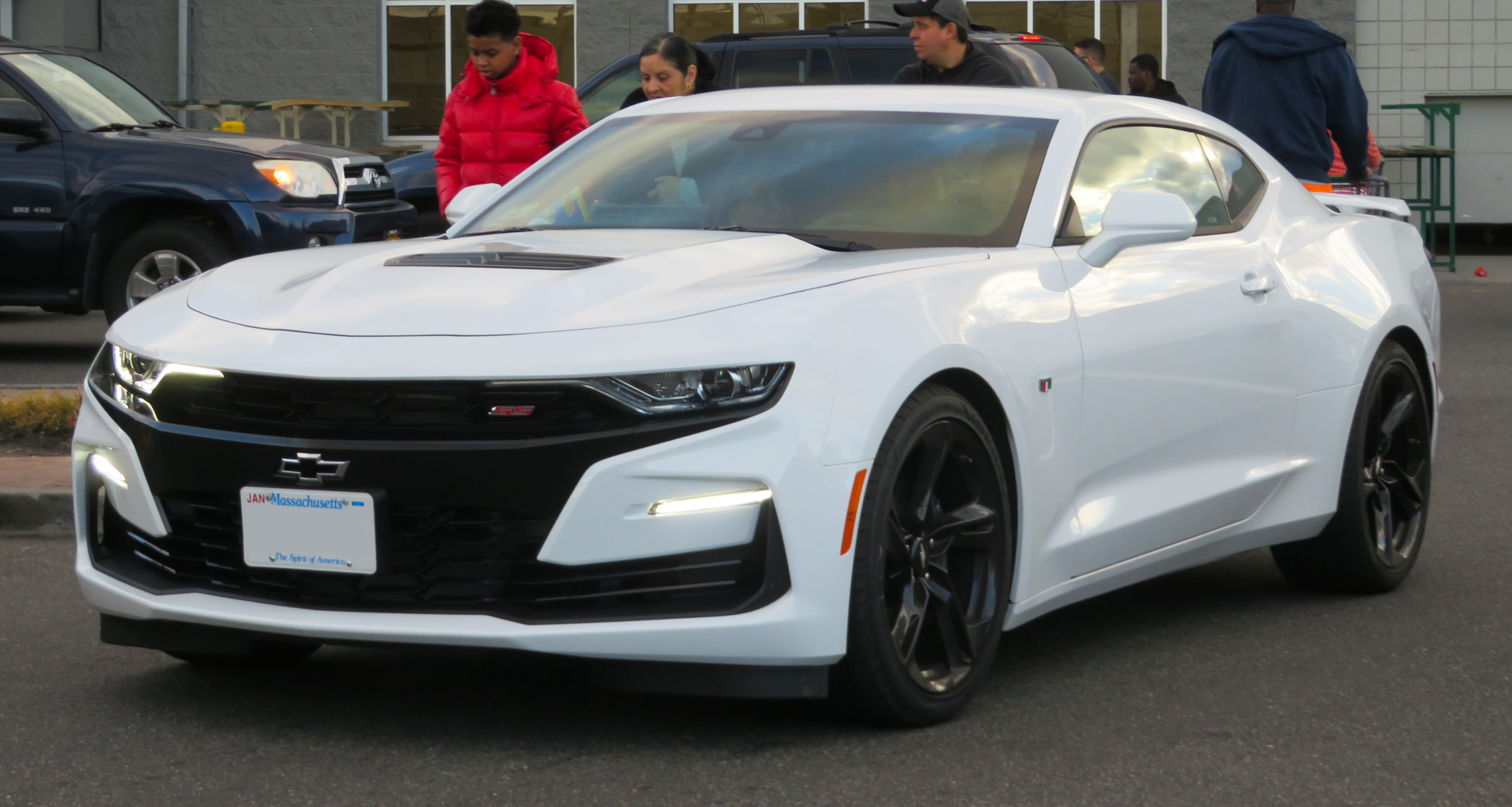
- 2019 Chevrolet Camaro 2SS

Overview
- Manufacturer: Chevrolet (General Motors)
- Production: October 2015 – December 2023
- Model years: 2016–2024 (United States); 2016–2024 (Japan); 2017–2022 (South Korea); 2017–2024 (Brazil); 2017–2024 (Mexico); 2019–2020 (Russia); 2019–2022 (Argentina); 2021–2024 (Colombia)
- Assembly: United States: Lansing, Michigan (Lansing Grand River Assembly)
- Designer: Hwasup Lee (2012); John Mack

Body and chassis
- Class: Pony car; Muscle car (S)
- Body style: 2-door coupé; 2-door convertible
- Layout: Front-engine, rear-wheel drive
- Platform: GM Alpha
- Related: Cadillac ATS; Cadillac CTS; Cadillac CT4; Cadillac CT5

Powertrain
- Engine: 2.0 L LTG Ecotec turbo I4 (LS, LT); 3.6 L LGX V6 (LT); 6.2 L LT1 V8 (LT1, SS); 6.2 L LT4 supercharged V8 (ZL1)
- Transmission: 6-speed TR-3160 manual (LS, LT); 6-speed TR-6060 manual (LT1, SS, ZL1); 8-speed 8L45 automatic (LS, LT); 8-speed 8L90 automatic (SS); 10-speed 10L60 automatic (LT - V6 models only); 10-speed 10L80 automatic (LT1, SS); 10-speed 10L90 automatic (ZL1)

Dimensions
- Wheelbase: 110.7 in (2,812 mm)
- Length: 188.3 in (4,783 mm); 188.4 in (4,785 mm) (China)
- Width: 74.7 in (1,897 mm)
- Height: 52.0 in (1,321 mm) (ZL1 1LE); 53.1 in (1,349 mm) 53.4 in (1,356 mm) (China)
- Curb weight: 3,339 lb (1,515 kg) 2.0 (LT); 3,435 lb (1,558 kg) 3.6 (LT); 3,461 lb (1,570 kg) 2.0 (RS); 3,618 lb (1,641 kg) (LT1); 3,685 lb (1,671 kg) (SS); 3,760 lb (1,706 kg) (SS; automatic); 3,880 lb (1,760 kg) (ZL1); 3,820 lb (1,730 kg) (ZL1 1LE)

Chronology
- Predecessor: Chevrolet Camaro (fifth generation)

The sixth-generation Chevrolet Camaro is an American pony car. Produced by automobile manufacturer Chevrolet, it was first introduced to the public on May 16, 2015. Sales started in 2015 for the 2016 model year. The Camaro now utilizes the GM Alpha platform shared with the Cadillac ATS and CTS and features multi-link MacPherson struts in front, rather than the former standard MacPherson strut setup. General Motors claims that 70 percent of architectural components in the new Camaro are unique to the car.

The sixth generation of Camaro saw production return to the United States as the fourth and fifth-generation models had been assembled in Canada.

Like its predecessor, the sixth generation of the Camaro is available in coupé and convertible body styles. Compared to the previous generation, it is 2.3 in (58 mm) shorter, 0.8 in (20 mm) narrower and 1.1 in (28 mm) shorter in height. With similar equipment and engine, it is also more than 200 lb (91 kg) lighter.

Production of the sixth-generation Camaro ended on December 14, 2023.

== Trim levels and special editions ==
Trim levels introduced at launch were LT (1LT, 2LT) and SS (1SS, 2SS). Standard equipment on all trims includes automatic air conditioning, cruise control, tilt/telescoping steering wheel, satellite radio, Apple CarPlay,backup camera and seven airbags.

Chevrolet added a base LS (1LS) trim level for the 2017 Camaro. Trim level content for the LS is identical to that of the base 1LT trim, with the exception that the 6-speed manual transmission would be the only available transmission option for the LS trim. The LS trim was initially introduced in coupé form, followed later by an LS convertible. The 1LT trim received the 8-speed automatic transmission with shift paddles as standard equipment for 2017.

For China, the car was introduced on August 31, 2016 and sold under the RS trim with the 2.0 L turbocharged LTG four-cylinder engine and 8-speed automatic gearbox available for 2017 models onwards as standard.

For the 2017 model year, the 1LE Performance Packages returned, tailored for the V6 and V8 powered 6-speed manual-equipped coupé models respectively. Both of 1LE packages offered share a satin black hood wrap, front splitter, and a three-piece rear spoiler. The V6 1LE package adds FE3 suspension from the Camaro SS, 20-inch forged wheels with Goodyear Eagle F1 245/40R20 front tires and 275/35R20 rear tires, Brembo 4-piston front brake calipers, mechanical limited-slip differential with a 3.27:1 ratio, track-cooling package, Alcantara (suede-like) steering wheel, short-throw shifter, dual-mode exhaust, Camaro SS fuel system to accommodate higher-load cornering, and a high-flow front grille.

Starting in 2019, the 1LE Package was also available with the four cylinder turbo. It adds similar equipment to the V6 1LE, including the FE3 suspension, Brembo brakes, 20-inch forged wheels with 245/40 and 275/35 Eagle F1 tires, track cooling, and mechanical limited-slip differential. The visual changes are also the same as the V6 1LE's. Car and Driver testing showed the I4 1LE was only 1.6 seconds slower around VIR than the V6.

For the 2020 model year, the Camaro LT1 debuted (not to be confused with the turbocharged I4 or V6-powered 1LT trim), and paired the styling of the standard LT trims with the 6.2L LT1 V8 engine from the SS models. Unlike the SS models, the LT1 trim could be equipped with the RS Package (RPO Code 'WRS') as the LT models. Options and packages also remained the same as the 1LT trim. A new 3LT trim was introduced that included all of the optional equipment of the mid-level 2LT trim, and the 2LT trim was de-contented, deleting the 8-inch touchscreen infotainment system and Bose premium audio system (replaced by a 7-inch touchscreen infotainment system and a 6-speaker audio system, respectively). These features became optional equipment on the 2LT trim.

For 2022 and onwards, the 1LE Package for the I4 or V6 trims was deleted.

In 2024, several changes were made to Camaro orders as GM got ready to cut production of the vehicle. A few of these changes included: shortening the production run for the 2024 Camaro, producing fewer units than in previous years, no longer offering fleet or government orders, and removing any GM employee discounts. Several major options were also discontinued such as the turbocharged 2.0L I4 LTG engine, the Rapid Blue and Shadow Gray Metallic paint colors, the lowered suspension and sway bar options, the 20-inch Caliente wheels, and the base 1LS trim level.

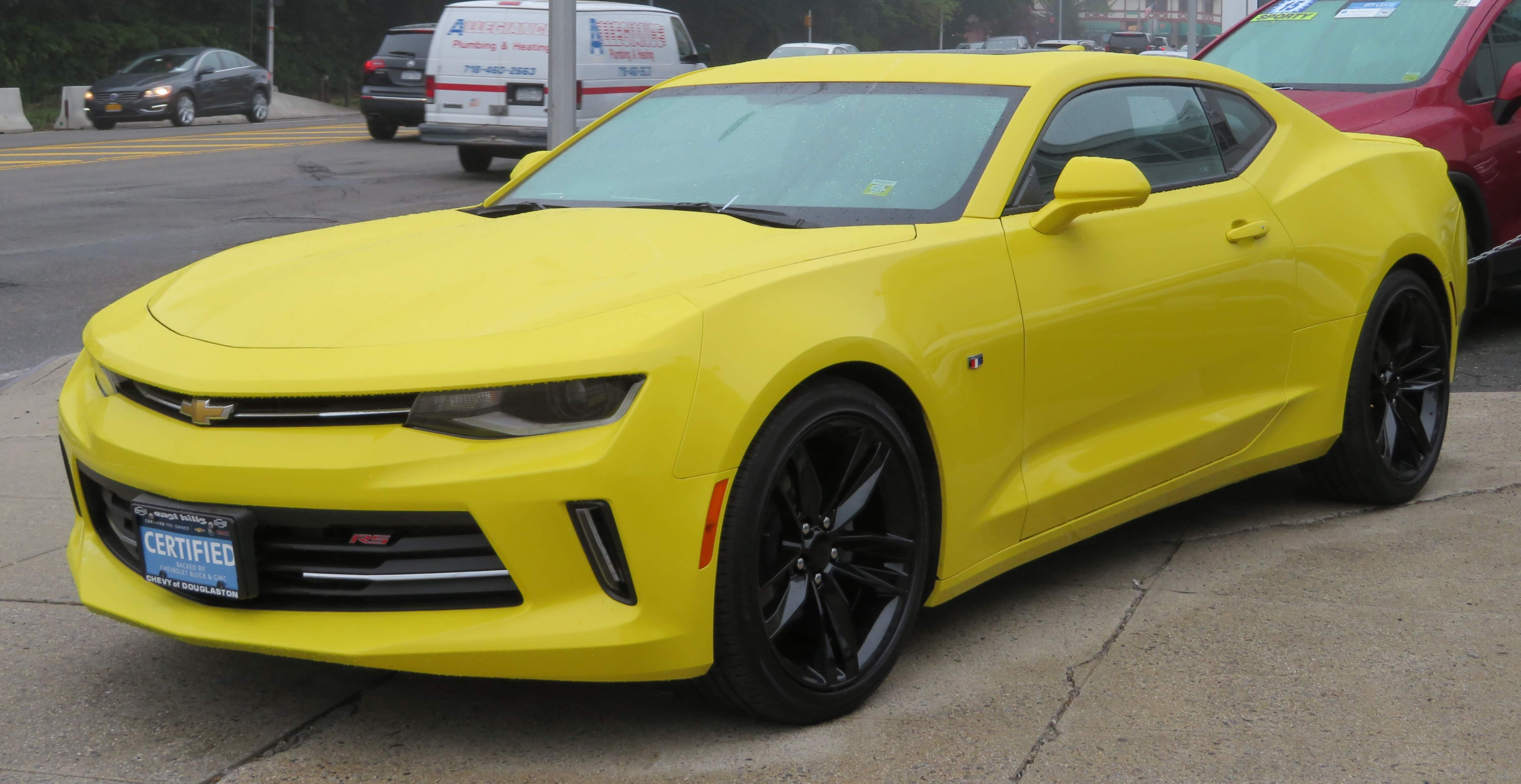
2018 Camaro 2LT RS in Bright Yellow with a few factory options

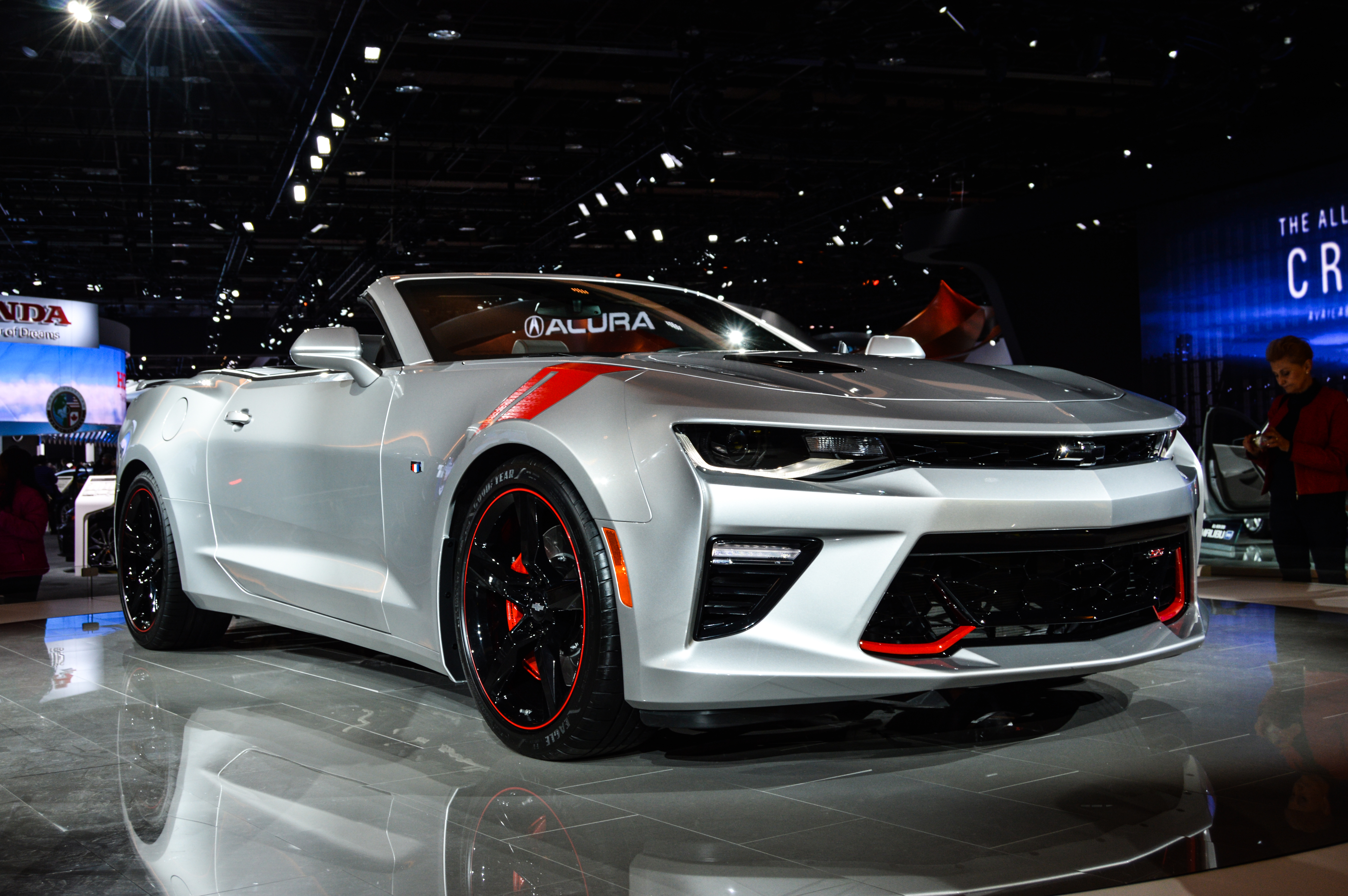
2016 Camaro 2SS convertible in Silver Ice Metallic with many factory options

=== SS ===
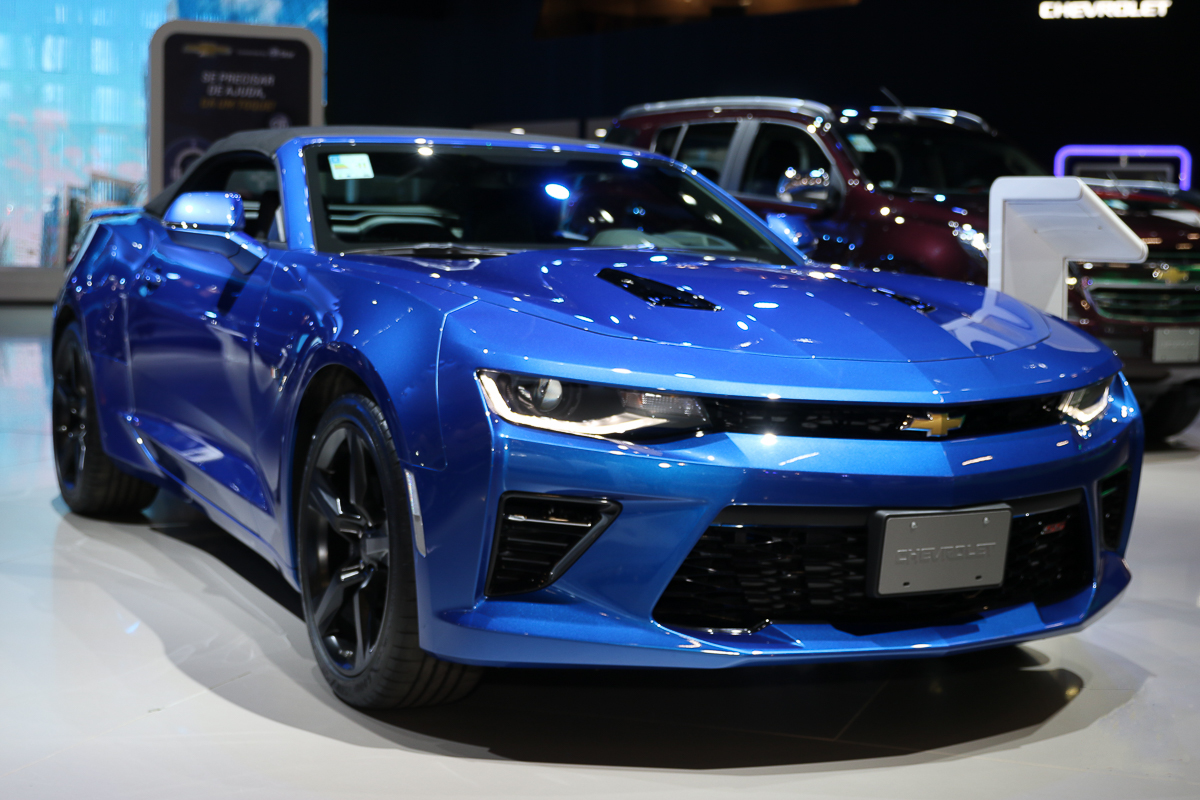
2016 Camaro 2SS

The SS model is equipped with a 6.2L LT1 V8 engine offered both as a 6-speed manual and an 8-speed automatic.

Chevrolet reports the SS produces 455 hp (339 kW; 461 PS) and 455 lb⋅ft (617 N⋅m; 63 kg⋅m) of torque, and can accelerate from 0-60 mph (97 km/h) in 4.0 seconds.

This model comes in two different trims, the 1SS and 2SS, which are mainly differentiated by their interior features. While the 1SS packs the same power, it lacks the leather heated/ventilated seats of the 2SS. The 2SS includes some other features left out in the 1SS like interior spectrum lighting, heated steering wheel, blind-spot monitoring, Bose audio, and wireless charging. Beginning in 2019, the 2SS trim also included a rearview mirror camera to improve visibility of the rear of the vehicle.

Both SS trim levels allow the addition of the available 1LE package which adds the Magnetic Ride Control FE4 suspension derived from the ZL1, electronic limited-slip differential with 3.73:1 ratio, 20-inch forged wheels with Goodyear Supercar 3 285/30R20 front tires and 305/30R20 rear tires, Brembo six-piston front brake calipers with two-piece 14.6-inch rotors, track-cooling package (oil cooler, transmission cooler, and differential cooler), Recaro front seats with Alcantara and leather upholstery, Alcantara steering wheel and short-throw shifter, dual-mode exhaust, and a color heads-up display.

In 2019 and subsequent years, the new 10L80 10-speed automatic transmission was offered in the SS trim level.

=== ZL1 ===
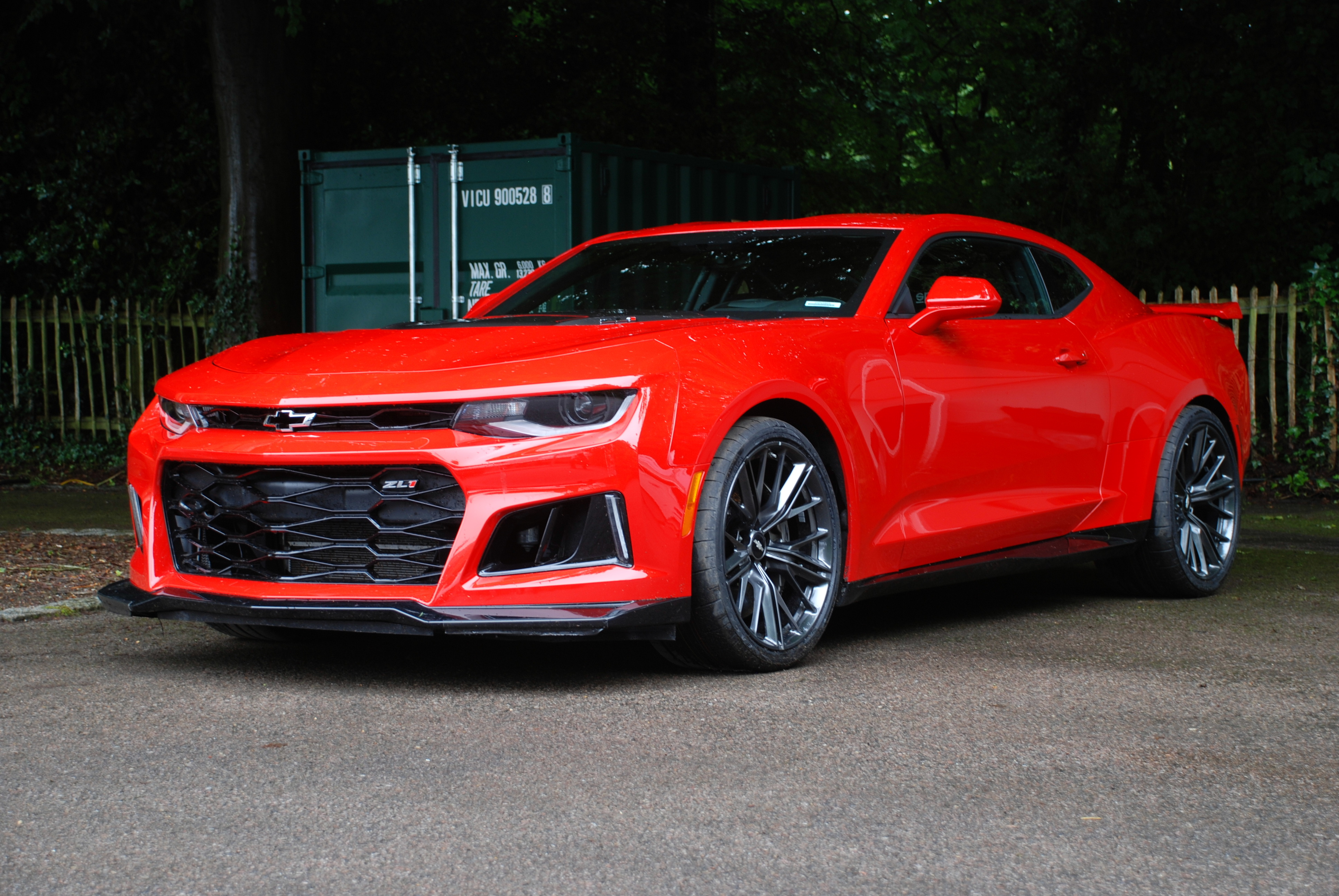
Camaro ZL1

The ZL1 is a high-performance model introduced in 2017 at the top of the Camaro lineup. The ZL1 is powered by a 6.2 L LT4 supercharged V8 producing 650 hp (485 kW; 659 PS) and 650 lb⋅ft (881 N⋅m; 90 kg⋅m). The powertrain also features 11 total heat exchangers for optimized cooling.

It features a lower grille opening for improved cooling, a new front splitter, and a carbon hood insert which removes hot air from the engine compartment. It also features wider front fenders to accommodate wider tires for improved handling, 20-inch forged aluminum wheels, unique rockers, and Magnetic Ride suspension. The ZL1 also features Brembo brakes with six-piston monoblock front calipers and 15.35-inch two-piece front rotors. The interior features Recaro front seats, as well as a sueded flat-bottom steering wheel and specialized shift knob.

Transmission choices are a rev matching 6-speed manual or a newly developed 10-speed automatic. The 10-speed 10L90 transmission was developed in collaboration with Ford. General Motors manufactures its own version in its own factory in Romulus, Michigan.

Performance figures include a 0 to 60 mph (0 to 97 km/h) acceleration time of 3.5 seconds and a 1/4 mile time of 11.4 seconds at 127 mph (204 km/h). The ZL1's official top speed is 198 mph (319 km/h).

The ZL1, along with the SS, were banned for sale in California and Washington due to their brake pads containing toxic metals and asbestos that were banned in California in 2014 and brake pads containing more than 5% of copper have been prohibited starting in January 2021.

==== ZL1 1LE Extreme Track Performance Package ====
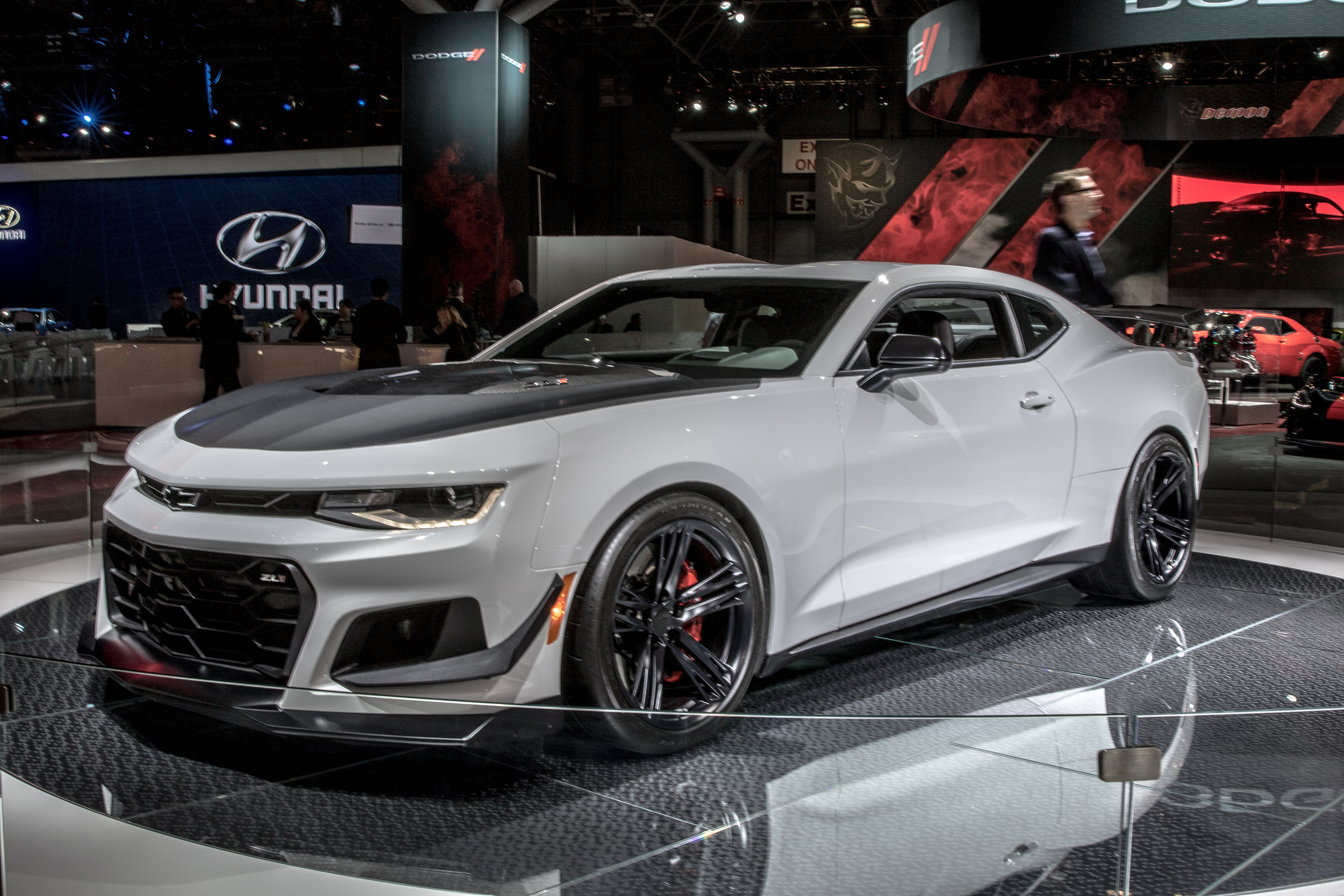
2018 Camaro ZL1 1LE

A more track-focused version known as the ZL1 1LE was introduced for the 2018 model year, a package featuring various performance enhancements to the standard ZL1.

On the exterior, it includes aerodynamic components developed with wind tunnel testing to produce 300 lb (136 kg) of downforce at 150 mph (241 km/h), consisting of a new front splitter, dive planes and a rear wing. It also features optimized grille and intake openings which allow 106 cubic feet more air per minute than the regular ZL1’s front end.

Additionally, the 1LE package includes adjustable Multimatic spool-valve shocks (similar to the previous generation of the Camaro Z28) paired with adjustable ball-jointed top mounts for camber adjustment and springs that are four times stiffer than the standard ZL1. The smaller 19-inch wheels (as opposed to 20-inch on the standard ZL1) are 3.3 lb (1 kg) lighter each and feature wider Goodyear Eagle F1 Supercar 3R tires with a compound formulated specially for the 1LE. The rubber subframe bushings are also replaced with solid aluminum counterparts to increase driving response.

Weight was also reduced by 60 lb (27 kg) as compared to a standard ZL1 due to thinner rear-window glass, fixed rear seatback, and lighter wheels and suspension components.

The ZL1 1LE Package was initially only available with a six-speed manual transmission, but later offered with a 10-speed automatic transmission from 2019 onwards.

In 2017, a ZL1 1LE set a lap time of 7 minutes, 16.04 seconds at the Nürburgring Nordschleife race track, driven by Bill Wise in an official test done by Chevrolet. This lap time was 13.6 seconds faster than the standard ZL1.

=== Special Editions ===
50th Anniversary Special Edition

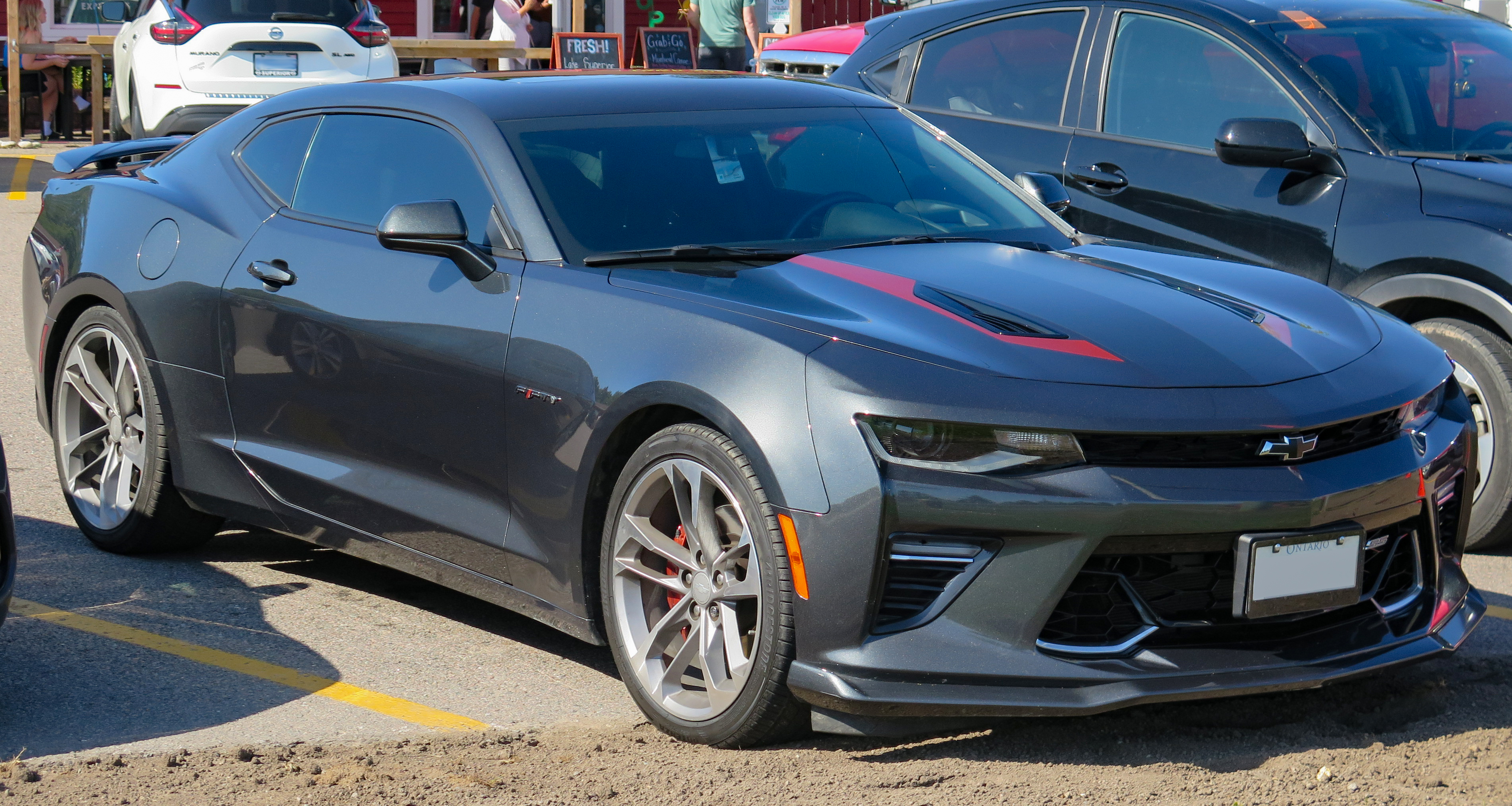
2017 Camaro 2SS 50th Anniversary Special Edition

The first special edition of the new Camaro became available in 2017. Available on 2LT and 2SS models in both coupé and convertible body styles, the 50th Anniversary Special Edition includes Nightfall Gray Metallic exterior paint, unique 20-inch aluminum-alloy wheels and wheel center caps, the RS Appearance Package (for LT/2LT models only), an orange 50th Anniversary exterior decal package with hood and rear trunk lid stripes, a "FIFTY" emblem on each front fender, a Nightfall Gray Metallic-painted front splitter, orange-painted front and rear brake calipers (front only for LT/2LT), black leather-and-Alcantara-trimmed seating surfaces with orange color accent stitching (including stitching on the dashboard, door panels, and steering wheel), and special door sill plates. However, all 2017 Chevrolet Camaro models received the same "FIFTY" badge on the bottom of the three-spoke steering wheel to commemorate the Camaro's 50th Anniversary.

Hot Wheels Special Edition

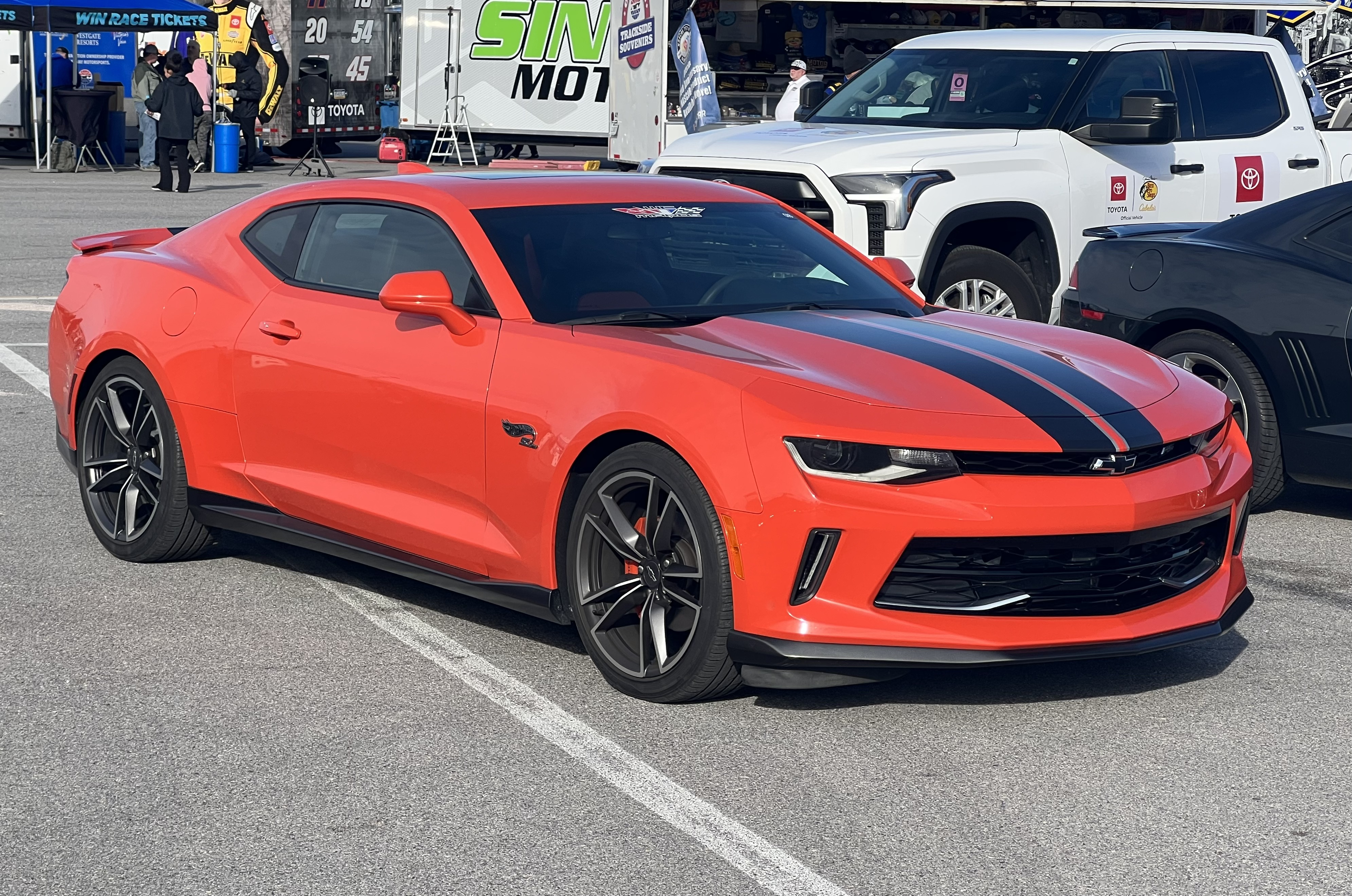
Camaro 2SS Hot Wheels Special Edition

At the SEMA Show in October 2017, Chevrolet introduced the Camaro Hot Wheels Special Edition, designed to commemorate both the 50th Anniversary of Hot Wheels die-cast toy vehicles, as well as all Hot Wheels diecast Chevrolet Camaro models, with inspiration coming from an actual Hot Wheels toy car. Available on 2LT and 2SS models in both coupé and convertible body styles, the Hot Wheels Special Edition includes a unique Crush Orange exterior paint, 20-inch Graphite-finished machined-face aluminum-alloy wheels (with summer-only tires on SS/2SS models), a Satin Graphite exterior decal package with hood and rear trunk lid stripes and silver accents, Satin Graphite exterior accents, a "Hot Wheels 50th Anniversary" front fender emblem, a unique front grille with Galvano chrome inserts, orange-painted front and rear brake calipers (front only for LT/2LT), a black Chevrolet bowtie emblem, a Jet Black leather-trimmed interior with orange color accent stitching (including stitching on the dashboard, door panels, and Alcantara-wrapped steering wheel), illuminated front door sill plates with the 'Hot Wheels' insignia, premium carpeted floor mats with orange-colored stitching and "Ghost Stripes", and orange knee bolsters and seat belts.

Redline Edition

For the 2018 model year, Chevrolet introduced the Chevrolet Camaro Redline Edition which joins the lineup of Chevrolet Redline Edition models already on sale at dealerships nationwide. The Redline Edition package included 20-inch black aluminum-alloy wheels with red accent stripes (including summer-only tires), black-painted side mirrors, a black lower front grille insert with red accent stripes, black bowtie emblems, Gloss Black front fender accent hash marks with red accents, a blackout rear tail lamp panel, darkened tail lamps, premium carpeted floor mats with red accents, and Gloss Black "Camaro" emblems on each front fender with red outlining.

ZL1 Garage 56 Edition

Prior to the 2023 24 Hours of Le Mans, Chevrolet released the 2024 Camaro ZL1 Garage 56 Edition to commemorate the modified Next Gen NASCAR Cup Car participating in the race, featuring unique graphics inspired by the race car and a NASCAR-inspired rear spoiler. The model is based on the ZL1 1LE. Production is limited to 56 units.

Collector's Edition

To commemorate the final model year of Camaro production, Chevrolet released the 2024 Camaro Collector's Edition for all trims of the Camaro. Each vehicle features unique exterior stripes, wheels and lug nuts, painted brake calipers and side spears, a black front grille and exterior side mirrors, an Alcantara flat-bottom steering wheel, and unique panther badging on the steering wheel, floor mats, and exterior of the vehicle. All Collector's Edition Camaros except the ZL1 will be painted Panther Black Metallic Tintcoat (paint code GLK), with LT, LT1, and SS models receiving gloss metallic paint, and the ZL1 model receiving unique Panther Black Matte (paint code GNW). LT and LT1 models will also come equipped with the RS Package (RPO Code "WRS"), and ZL1 models will receive a black fuel door with a visible carbon fiber insert and carbon fiber interior moldings. The Collector's edition in the ZL1 package is a batch of 350 cars with 300 going to the US market and 30 going to the Canadian market, and 20 to Mexico. Other trims are not limited in numbers.

COPO

The COPO Camaro is a non-street legal, purpose-built race car. It was only available through US Chevrolet dealerships.

== Engines and transmissions ==
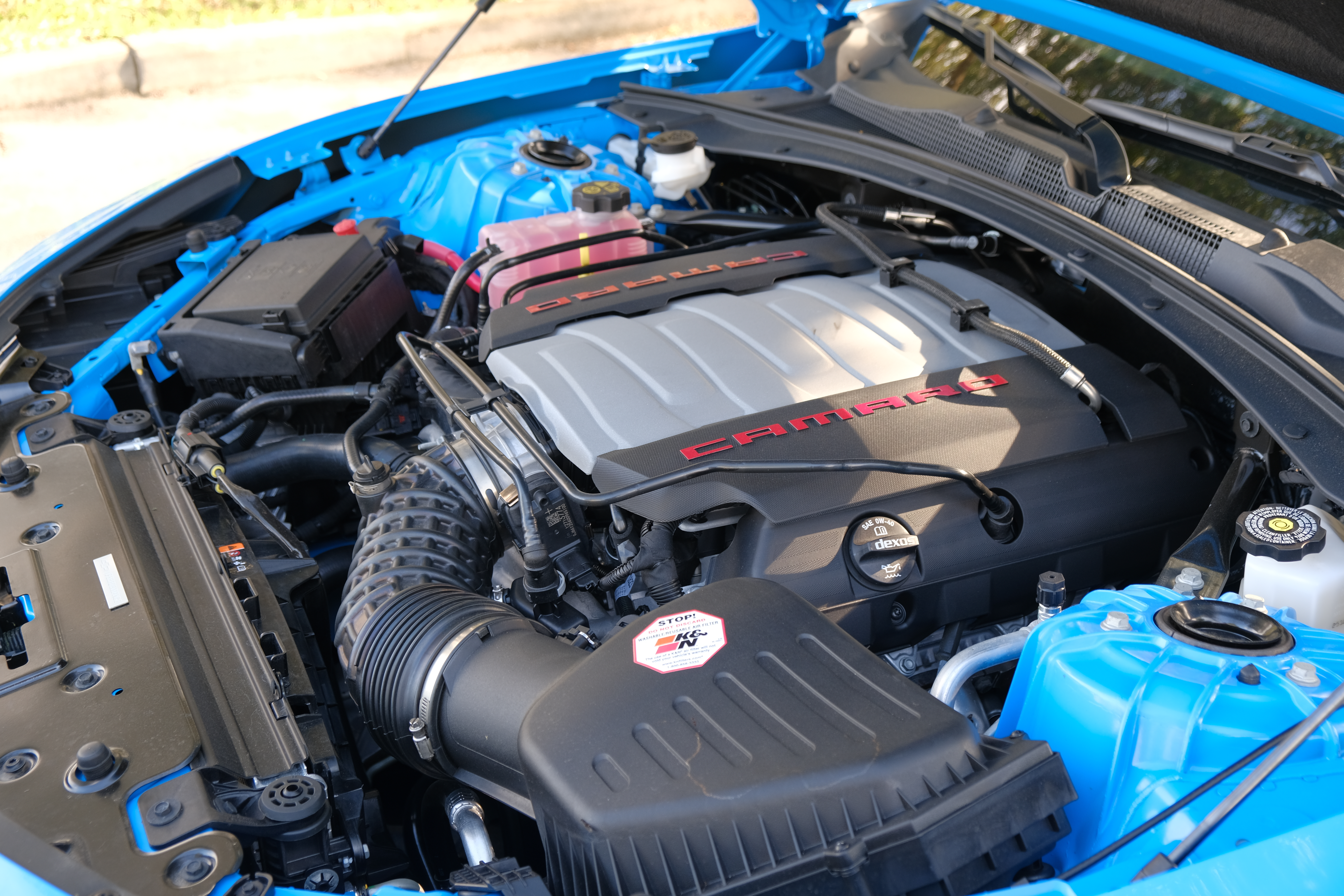
LT1 engine in a 2022 Camaro LT1

The sixth generation of the Chevrolet Camaro is available with three engine options:

- The 2.0 liter LTG Ecotec turbocharged straight-four, which has a power output of 275 hp (205 kW; 279 PS) at 5,600 rpm and 295 lb⋅ft (400 N⋅m; 41 kg⋅m) of torque at 3,000 rpm and is the first four-cylinder in a Camaro since the 3rd generation model. It is available on 1LS, 1LT and 2LT trims.
- The 3.6 liter LGX V6 engine, having a power output of 335 hp (250 kW; 340 PS) at 6,800 rpm and 284 lb⋅ft (385 N⋅m; 39 kg⋅m) of torque at 5,300 rpm.
- The 6.2 liter LT1 V8 engine, which is shared with the Corvette C7 and has a power output of 455 hp (339 kW; 461 PS) at 6,000 rpm and 455 lb⋅ft (617 N⋅m; 63 kg⋅m) of torque at 4,400 rpm.

Engines installed on high-performance models include:

- The 6.2 liter supercharged LT4 V8, which is shared with the Corvette Z06 and has an output of 650 hp (485 kW; 659 PS) at 6,400 rpm and 650 lb⋅ft (881 N⋅m; 90 kg⋅m) of torque at 3,600 rpm.

LT4 engine in a stock Camaro ZL1

All engines were initially available with a 6-speed manual and 8-speed automatic transmissions, except for the ZL1 models, which use a 10-speed automatic in addition to a standard 6-speed manual. The 8-speed was replaced by the 10-speed automatic in the 2019 SS and 2020 V6 models.

European Union's new Euro 6d-Temp automotive emission regulations ended the European sale of Camaro on 31 August 2019. The 6.2-litre V8 engine fitted to the export version of Camaro could not be modified further to meet the new emission regulations.

For 2024, GM has discontinued the turbocharged 2.0L I4 LTG engine and the base 1LS trim level as part of their efforts to slow down production of the Camaro.

== HSV Chevrolet Camaro (Australia) ==
General Motors Holden's performance division, Holden Special Vehicles, was engaged in the import and conversion of the Camaro to right-hand-drive and Australian Design Rules, from the second half of 2018. Unlike Holden's previous American import, the Holden Suburban, the Chevrolet badge remained on the converted Camaro. The Suburban was also originally built as RHD, rather than being converted after arriving in Australia.

HSV imported and converted the European Camaro 2SS and ZL1. The manual gearbox, along with the ZL1 model, were made available in 2019. There was a total of 375 ZL1s converted by HSV. Imports stopped in early 2020 following limited sales, with the possibility remaining of resuming them in the future under the new GMSV brand.

== Redesign ==
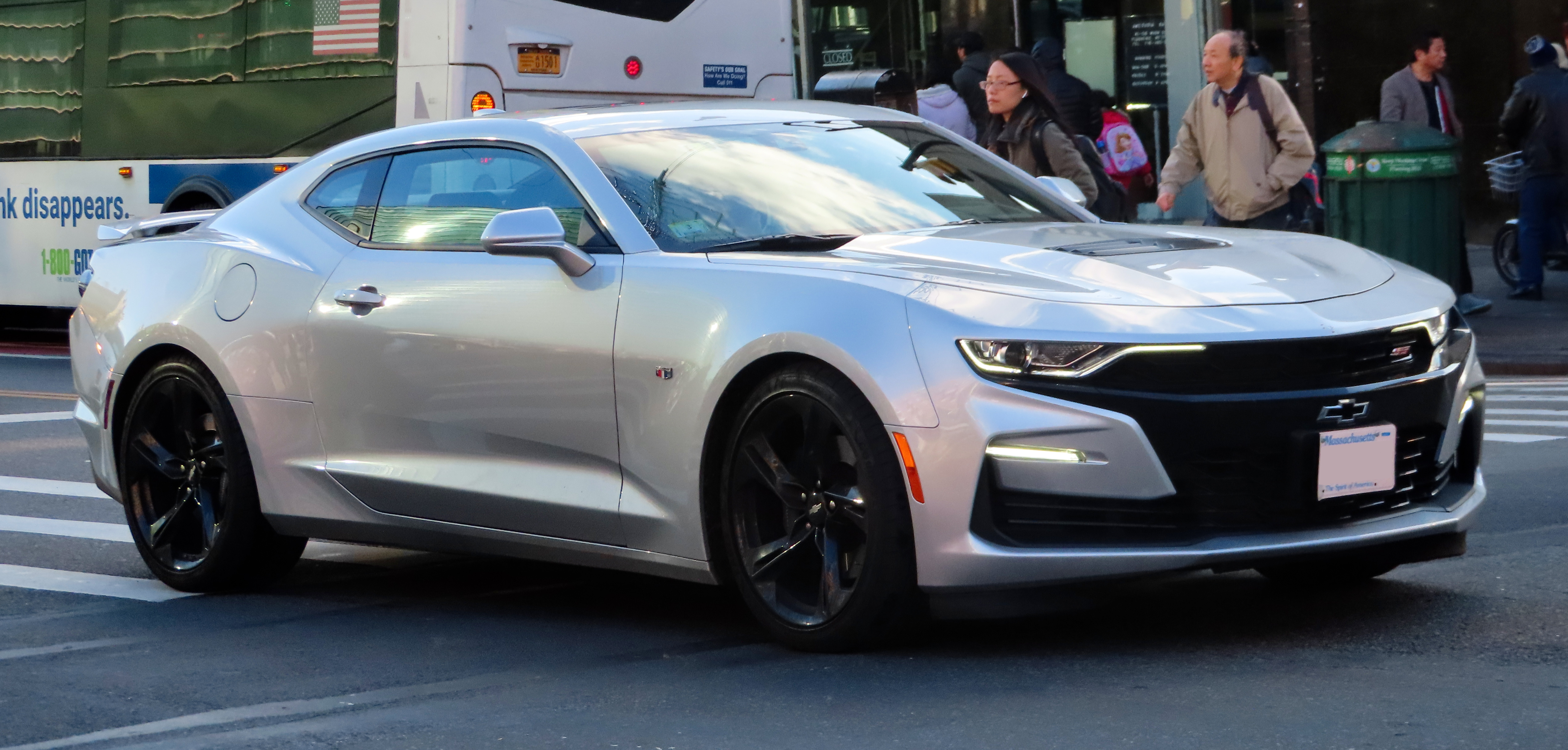
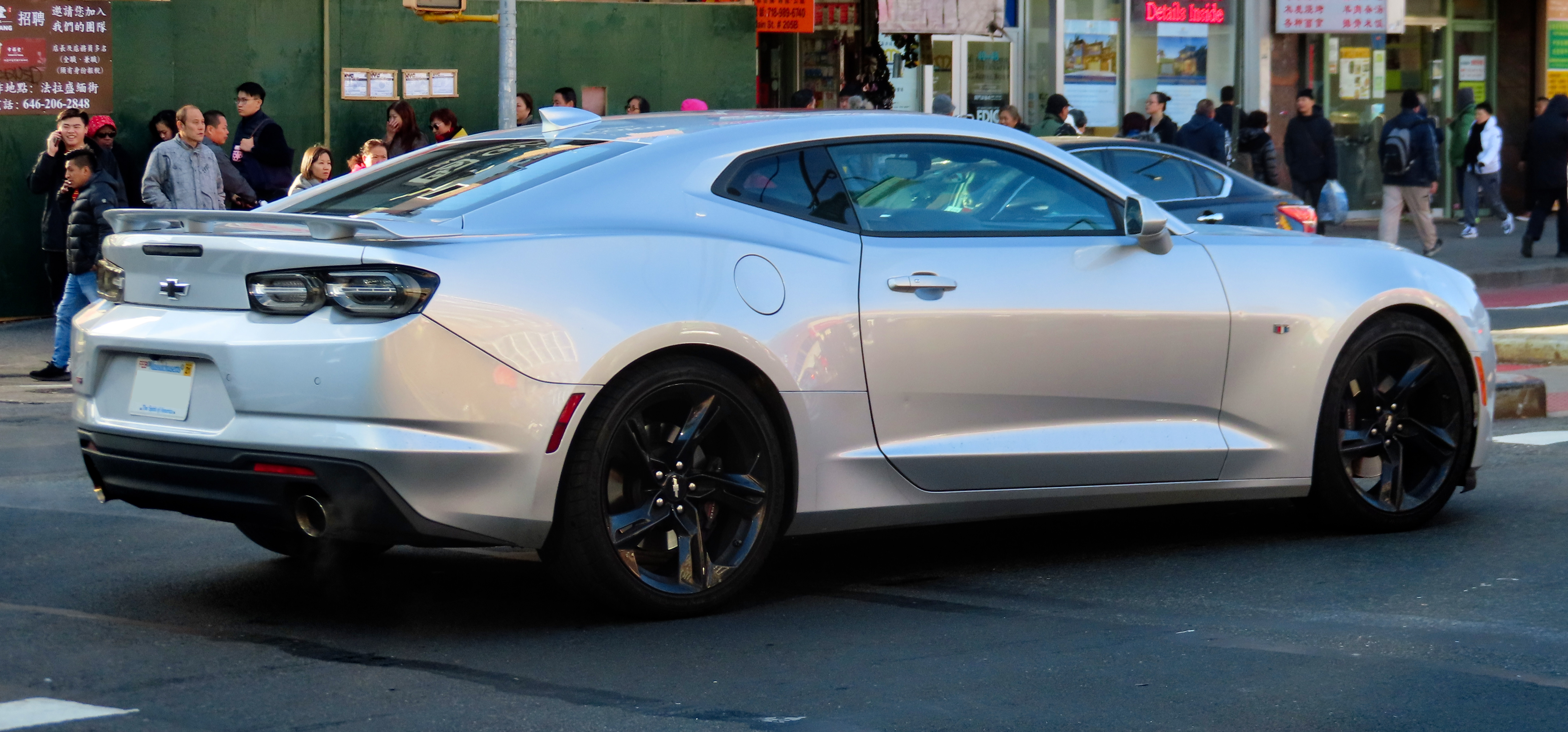
2019 Camaro 2SS (facelift)

In fall 2018 (for the 2019 model year), the sixth-generation of the Camaro received a mid-cycle redesign, along with the majority of the Chevrolet car lineup (including the Spark, Cruze and Malibu), in which the front end styling was criticized by many.

Changes for the 2019 model year also included a new third-generation MyLink infotainment system, revised exterior and interior styling, new alloy wheel designs, the addition of the 1LE Performance Package for the base 2.0 L I4 equipped LT models (the 1LE Performance Package was previously only offered on V6-equipped LT and V8-equipped SS and ZL1 models), the addition of two new exterior colors (Riverside Blue Metallic and Satin Steel Gray Metallic), and a new performance hood for SS models. The SS also dropped the optional 8-speed automatic in favor of the 10-speed automatic. Driver-assistance features were also improved on the 2019 model, including Lane Change Alert with Side Blind Zone Alert. The 2019 Chevrolet Camaro went on sale in the fall of 2018. The MyLink infotainment systems were replaced by the new Infotainment 3 systems, in both seven-inch and eight-inch sizes, the latter available with connected GPS navigation.

Chevrolet also exhibited a 2019 Camaro SS at the 2018 SEMA Show in the new Shock yellow-green exterior color, which became available in early 2019. It also featured a "concept" front end, which unlike the production version of the SS has a body-colored bumper and the Chevy "bow-tie" badge moved to the upper grille.

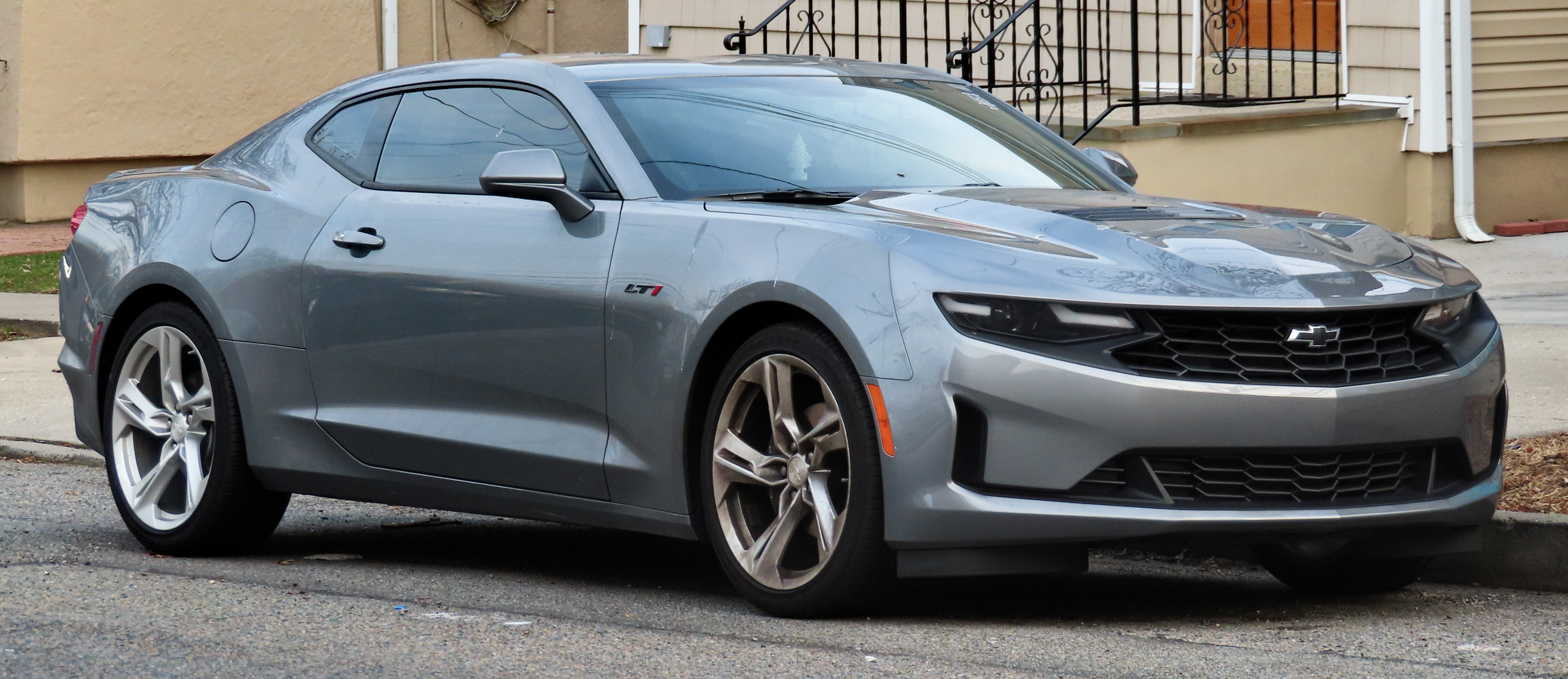
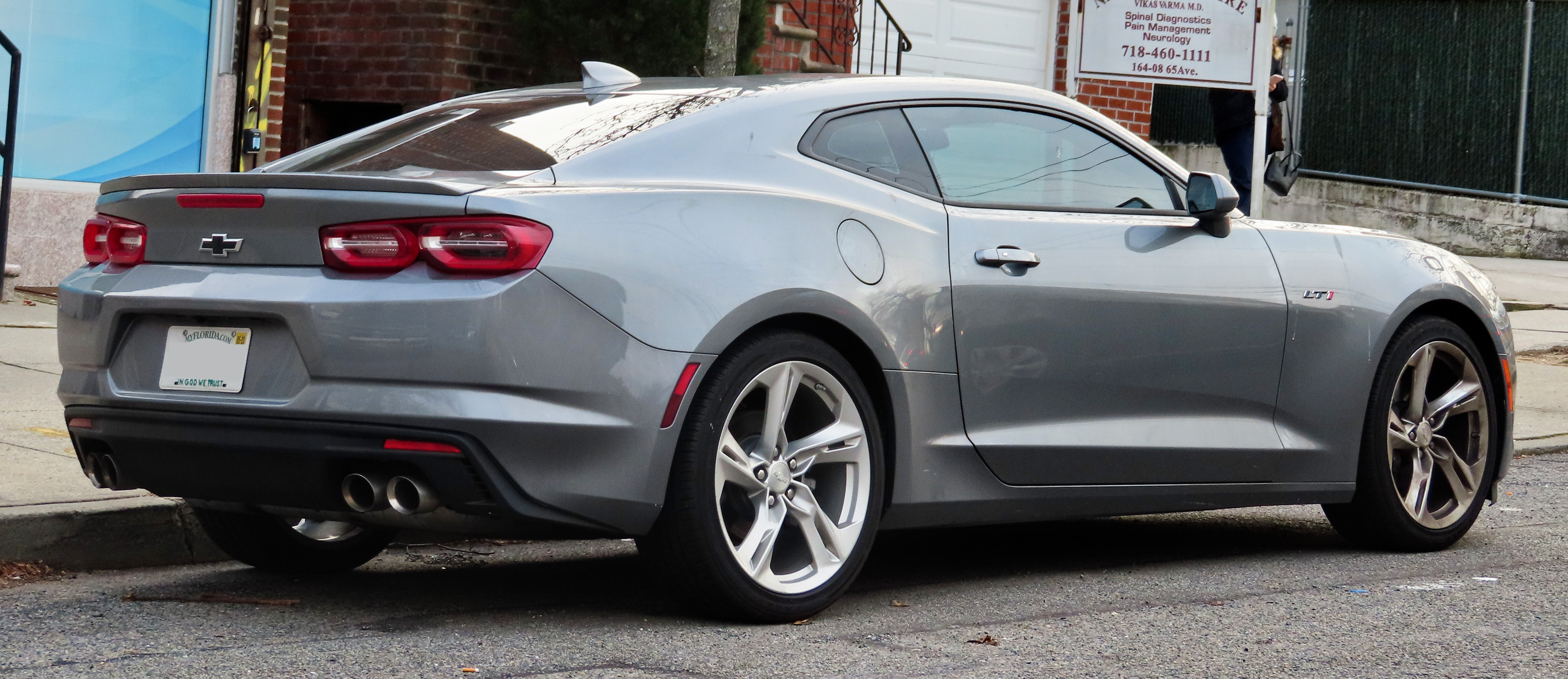
2020 Camaro LT1 (second facelift)

For the 2020 model year, Chevrolet revised the front-end styling of the Camaro SS, the front bumper is now colored and the Chevy "bow-tie" has been moved to the upper grille.

A new entry-level V8 trim called the "Camaro LT1 V8" equipped with a 6.2 L LT1 V8 engine rated at 455 hp (339 kW) was added to the line-up, which keeps the design of the V6 1LT model and doesn't offer all the performance features of the SS model. The V6 model is now equipped with a 10-speed automatic transmission as an option and replaces the previous 8-speed transmission. A new exterior color option called the "Rally Green" was added. The 2020 Camaro went on sale in fall 2019.

== Motorsports ==
=== GT4 ===
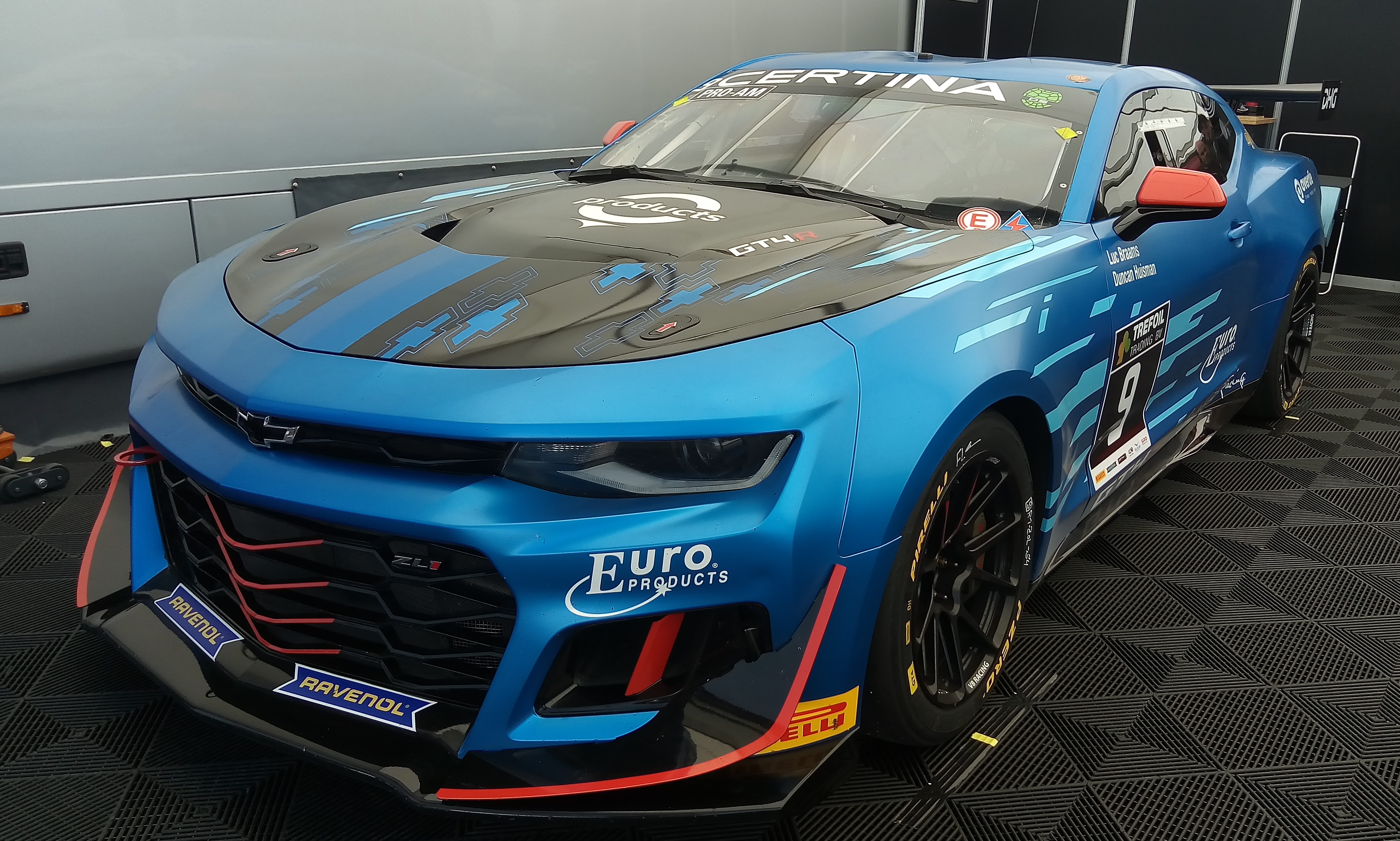
Chevrolet Camaro GT4

Pratt Miller developed the Chevrolet Camaro GT4.R for GT4 international racing in 2017. While based on the Camaro ZL1, regulations preventing the use of superchargers meant the naturally-aspirated LT1 6.2 liter V8 from the Camaro SS instead of the ZL1's LT4 supercharged V8 was used in the racing car featuring direct fuel injection, a carbon fiber intake, a custom camshaft, a Motec data acquisition system and a Bosch MS6 ECU. The engine has a power output up to 480 hp (358 kW; 487 PS).

Other changes include the Xtrac paddle-shift operated 6-speed sequential transmission, an Xtrac Salisbury type differential, six-piston Brembo front brake calipers with four-piston rear calipers, custom adjustable front and rear antiroll bars, and two-way adjustable Öhlins TTX-46 front struts and TTX-36 rear dampers. Exterior changes include wider front fenders, a hood extractor, aerodynamic side skirts, lightweight carbon fiber doors and front fascia, a custom GT4 specification carbon fiber rear spoiler, GT4 specification front dive planes, and a GT4 specification carbon fiber front splitter the car also has 18-inch forged Forgeline one-piece alloy wheels with racing slicks. The total weight of the car is 3,131 lb (1,420 kg).

=== NASCAR ===
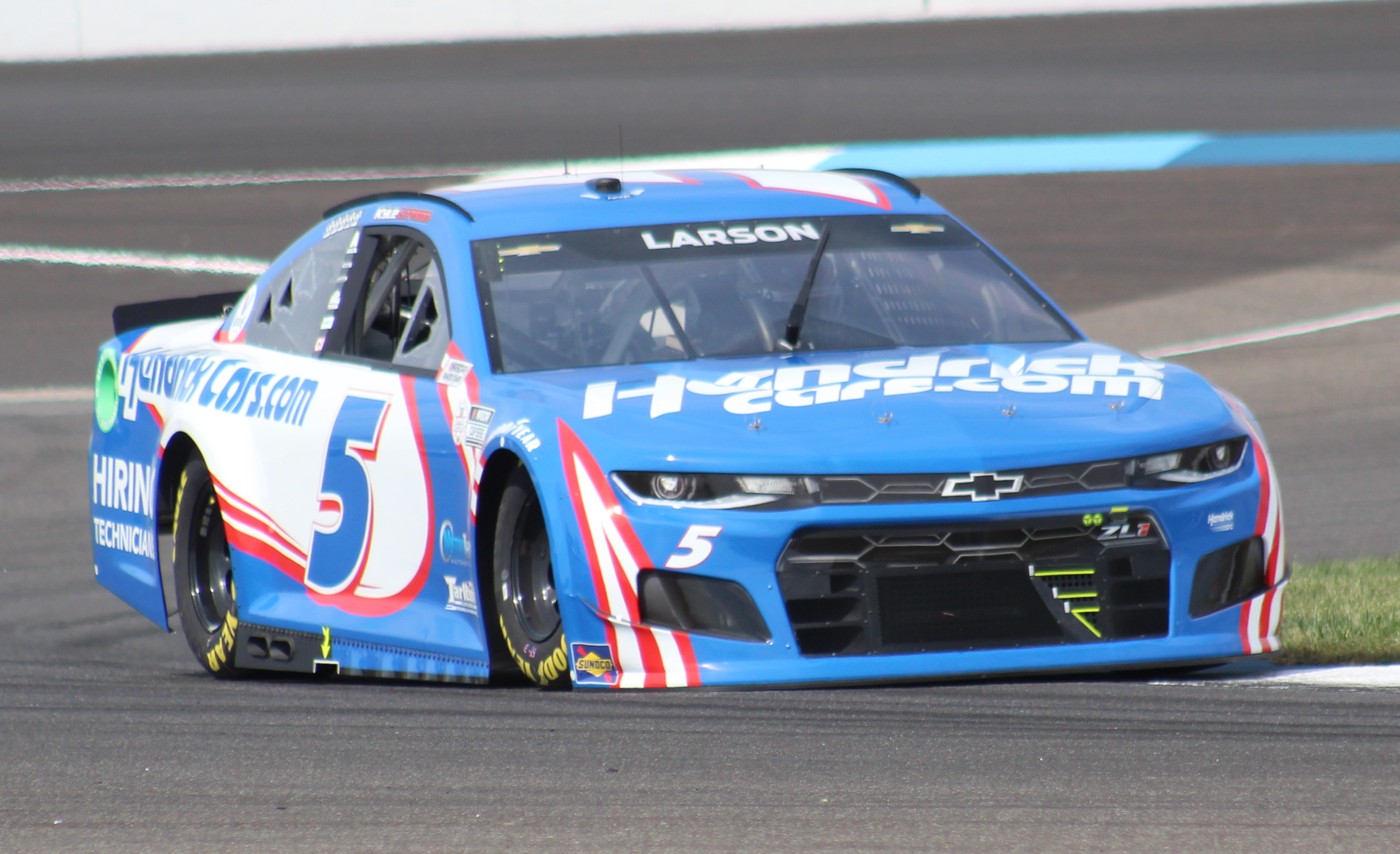
Chevrolet Camaro ZL1 NASCAR

The Camaro ZL1 replaced the Chevrolet SS, which had been used since 2013. The new Camaro started participating in the 2018 Monster Energy NASCAR Cup Series season, and it won on its debut in the 2018 Daytona 500 with driver Austin Dillon. In the 2020 NASCAR Cup Series, the Camaro won its first NASCAR Cup Series championship with driver Chase Elliott. In the 2021 season, Chevrolet backed-up their title with Kyle Larson, who won his first Cup championship. As the Camaro was discontinued after 2023 with no direct replacement, Chevrolet rebranded all Camaro-body stock cars as the "ZL1" starting with the 2025 season.

The Camaro SS is also currently used in the NASCAR Xfinity Series, being driven by the likes of A. J. Allmendinger, and Austin Hill. The car has been used since the 2018 season, and it won in its first race at Daytona. Tyler Reddick beat teammate Elliott Sadler in the closest finish in NASCAR history. The Camaro SS has so far won three championships, in 2018 and 2019 with Reddick, and 2024 with Justin Allgaier. Following the discontinuation of the Camaro in 2023, all Camaro-body stock cars have been rebranded as generic Chevrolet cars since the 2025 season.

==== 24 Hours of Le Mans ====
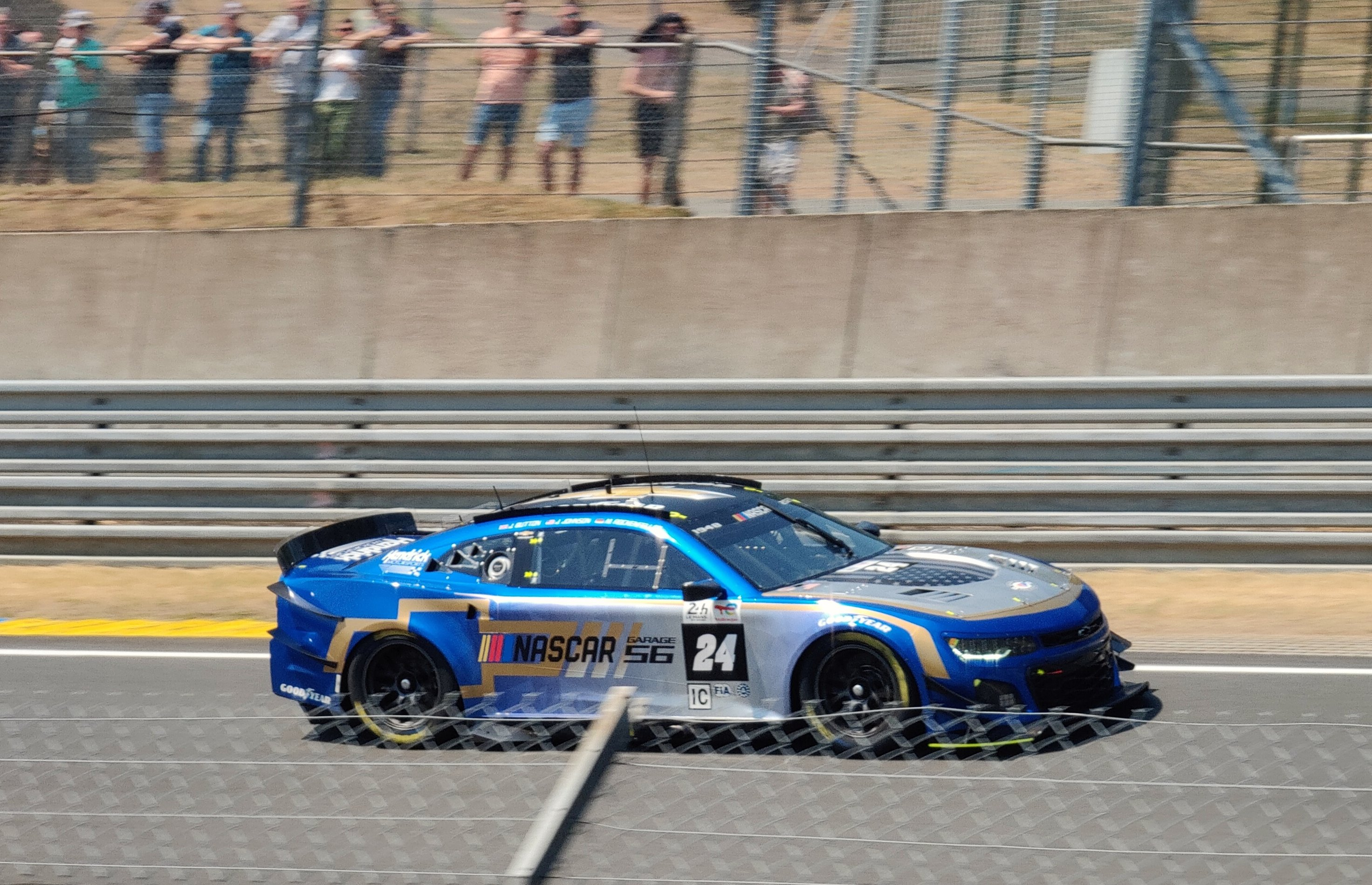
Garage 56 Chevrolet Camaro ZL1

For the 2023 24 Hours of Le Mans, which marked NASCAR's 75th anniversary and coincided with the race's centenary, the Garage 56 concept car entry was based on the Camaro ZL1 stock car. Hendrick Motorsports fielded the modified NASCAR Cup Series Next Gen stock car. 7-time Cup Series champion Jimmie Johnson, 2009 Formula One World Championship winner and NASCAR driver Jenson Button and 2010 Le Mans overall and LMP1 winner and WEC veteran Mike Rockenfeller were the drivers, while Johnson's longtime crew chief Chad Knaus was project manager. The car also bore #24 in honor of Jeff Gordon.

During the endurance race, the Garage 56 Camaro exceeded expectations and drew large international fanfare, for its performance and stark visual and aural contrast to the rest of the field. For the majority of the race, the Garage 56 Camaro was ahead of all the cars in the GTE class. However, after the 20th hour, the vehicle encountered a driveline issue which necessitated over an hour of repairs, after which the team finished in 39th place out of 62 cars, after completing 285 laps.

=== Supercars Championship ===
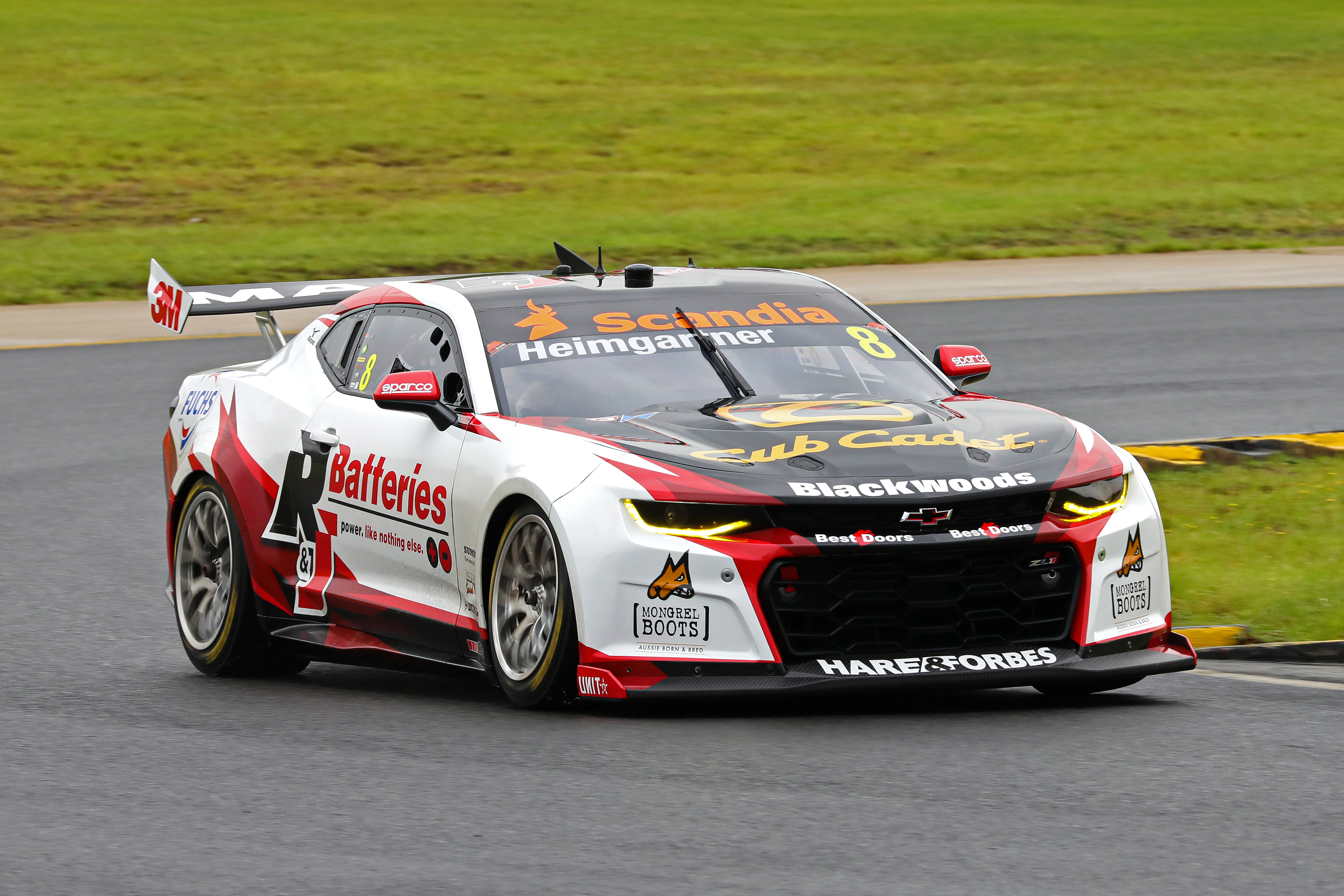
Chevrolet Camaro ZL1 Supercars

The Camaro ZL1 replaced the Holden Commodore in the Supercars Championship, starting from 2023.

The 2023 Teams' and Drivers' Championship was won by Erebus Motorsport and their driver Brodie Kostecki, with Chevrolet also winning the manufacturers championship piloting the Camaro ZL1 Supercar.

The 2024 Teams' and Drivers' Championship was won by Triple Eight Race Engineering & Will Brown, with Chevrolet also winning the manufacturers championship piloting the Camaro ZL1 Supercar.

The 2025 Teams' and Manufacturers' Championship was won by Triple Eight Race Engineering & Chevrolet with the Camaro ZL1 Supercar.

=== Turismo Carretera ===
In Argentina, the historic racing series Turismo Carretera announced the most significant renewal of its vehicle fleet in recent decades, beginning in 2024. This involved homologating the use of muscle car bodies produced in the 21st century, replacing models dating from the 1960s and 70s. The sixth-generation Camaro was chosen to represent Chevrolet, replacing the Nova/"Chevy". On December 7, 2025, this model finally achieved its first title in the series, with Agustín Canapino winning the championship.

== Awards and recognition ==
- 2016 Indianapolis 500 Official Pace Car
- Motor Trend Magazine 2016 Car of the Year
- Car and Driver 2016, 2017, and 2018 10 Best Cars
- J.D. Power 2016, 2017, and 2021 Most Dependable Midsize Sporty Car

== Sales (United States) ==
Original
Year	Total	LT	SS	SS 1LE	ZL1	ZL1 1LE
2016	72,705	???	???	N/A	N/A	N/A
2017	67,940	???	???	???	???	???
2018	50,963	???	???	???	???	???

First refresh
Year	Total	LT	SS	SS 1LE	ZL1	ZL1 1LE
2019	48,265	???	???	???	???	???

Second refresh
Year	Total	LT	SS	SS 1LE	ZL1	ZL1 1LE
2020	29,775	???	???	???	???	???
2021	21,893	???	???	???	???	???
2022	24,652	???	???	???	???	???
2023	31,028	???	???	???	???	???
2024	3,574	???	???	???	???	???

== Appearances ==
=== Indy 500 ===
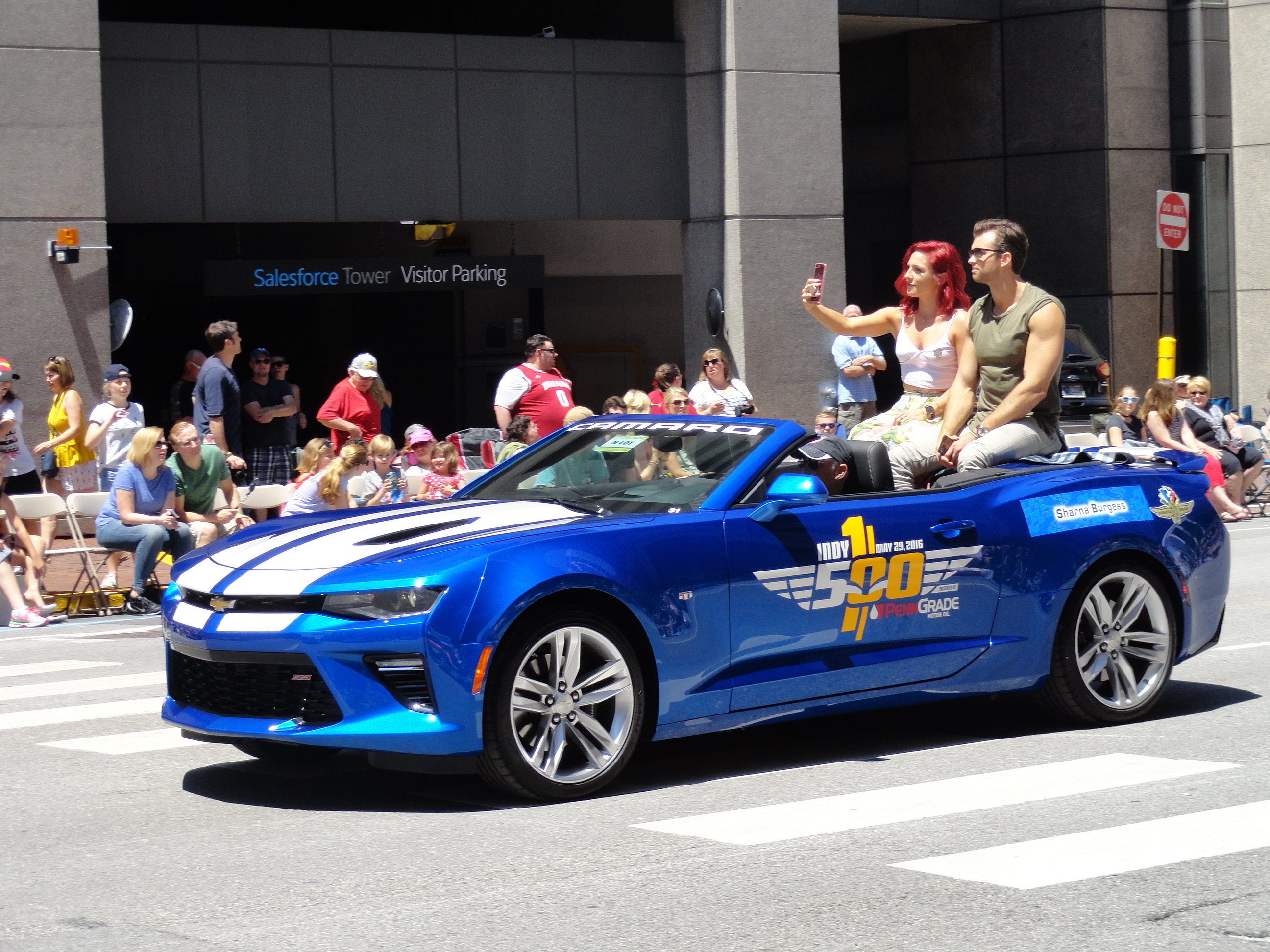
2016 Camaro 2SS Indy 500 Festival Car

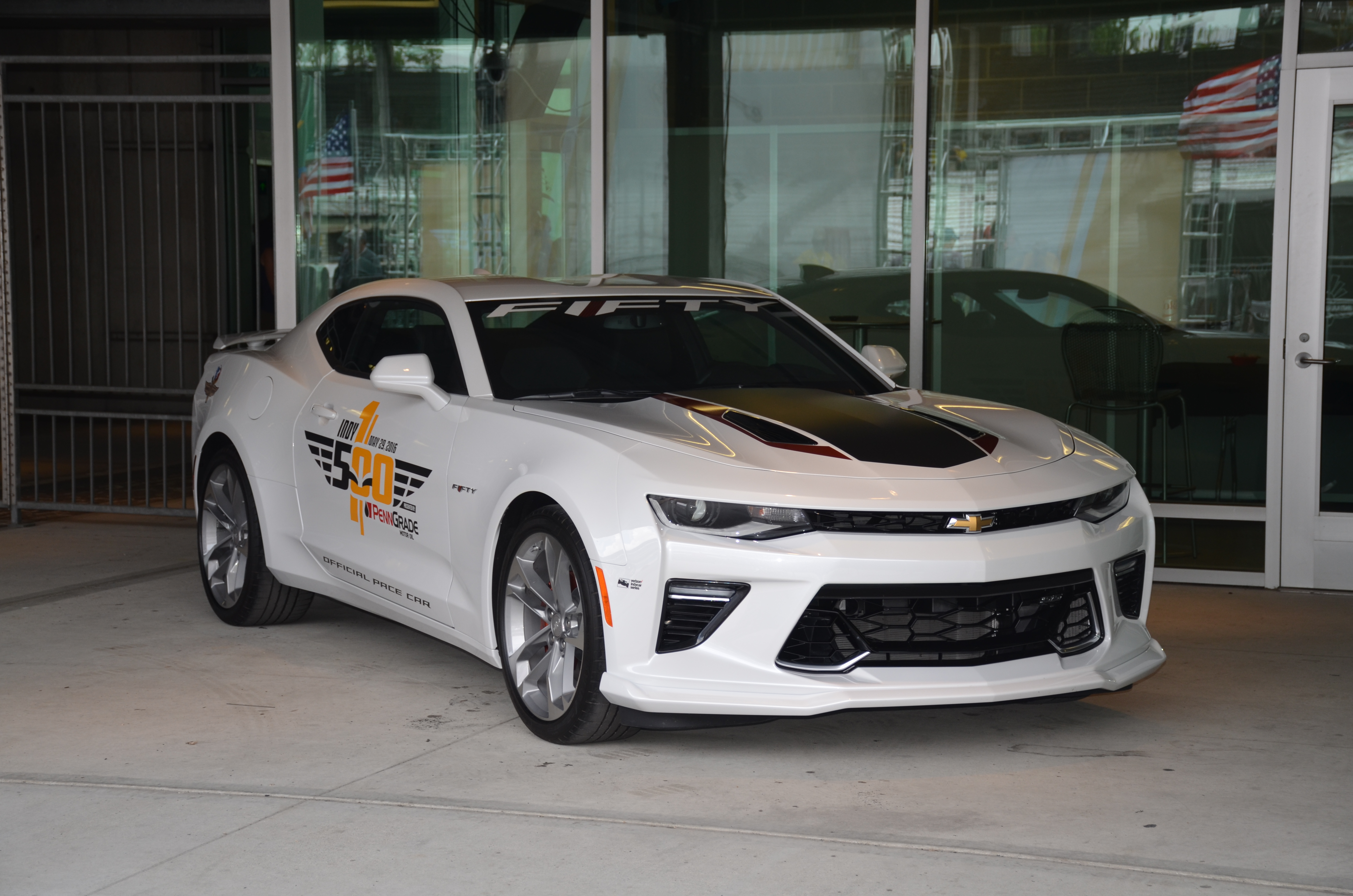
2016 Camaro 2SS Indy 500Pace Car

The sixth generation Camaro appeared numerous times in events surrounding the Indianapolis 500. It was used as a festival car from 2016–2018 and from 2020–2023. These cars were 2SS convertibles with various different options and colors depending on the year. They were given unique decal liveries specific to the Indy 500.

In 2016, the Camaro was used as the official pace car of the Indy 500. Roger Penske led the 100th running of the Indianapolis 500 in a Summit White 2017 Chevrolet Camaro SS 50th Anniversary Edition coupé.

=== Hertz-Hendrick Motorsports ===
In 2019, the Hertz Corporation added 224 modified 2020 Camaros into their fleet of rental cars. These "specialty cars" were modified with the help of Hendrick Motorsports. There were two distinct trims made: a 2SS and a ZL1.

Hendrick Motorsports made 200 of the 2SS models, each upgraded to 480 horsepower. They were outfitted with 20-inch satin black wheels, a Performance Upgrade Package inclusive of a Chevrolet Cold Air Intake and Chevrolet Cat-back Dual Exhaust Upgrade System, custom exterior graphics package, strut tower bar with Hendrick Motorsports branding, custom Hertz lighted door sill plates, embroidered headrests with the No. 24 team logo and William Byron’s signature, Hertz fender badges, and a Hertz-Hendrick Motorsports plaque denoting the individual numbering of the 200 custom Camaros.

The remaining 24 cars were all ZL1s that were upgraded to 750 horsepower. They were each equipped with a larger Callaway Supercharger, custom Hertz wheels, custom Hertz lighted door sill plates, embroidered headrests with Hertz-sponsored Hendrick Motorsports driver William Byron’s signature and the No. 24 team logo, Hertz fender badges, and a Hertz-Hendrick Motorsports plaque denoting the individual numbering of the 24 custom Camaros. Hertz shipped these cars from Chevrolet's assembly plant to Callaway's facility in Old Lyme, Connecticut. They replaced the factory supercharger with Callaway's GenThree TripleCooled TVS 2,300cc which contains a proprietary intercooler system and is 32% larger. The vehicles were then shipped to Hendrick Motorsports for the final trim installation. Once completed, these specialty cars were shipped to select Hertz airport locations including: Charlotte Douglas International Airport, Southwest Florida International Airport, Harry Reid International Airport, Miami International Airport, Orlando International Airport, and Phoenix Sky Harbor International Airport.
