= Heated air inlet =

Engine part

A heated air inlet or warm air intake is a system commonly used on the original air cleaner assemblies of carburetted engines to increase the temperature of the air going into the engine for the purpose of improving the consistency of the air/fuel mixture to reduce engine emissions and fuel usage. This is especially useful during cold or winter climates, when the engine is being started, to help with initial combustion and to bring the engine to optimum operating temperature.

== Operating principle ==
Heated air intake systems operate on the principle of increasing the temperature of the air. The fuel will more effectively stay in suspension in the air rather than falling out of suspension and forming droplets on the floor of the manifold. Warm air from the outside of an exhaust manifold is drawn up into the air cleaner to increase the air temperature as quickly as possible after the engine starts. The air cleaner assembly incorporates a thermostatic vacuum switch that responds to the air temperature after the air filter element and actuates a vacuum motor that moves the control flap to allow the air to be drawn from a cooler location such as the top of the engine bay or outside the engine bay. If the air becomes too cold, the thermostatic switch will automatically change back to drawing heated air from around the outside of the exhaust.

The system was often used with computerized carburetors or throttle body injection systems but is typically not used with multi-point fuel injection, as the problem of fuel falling out of suspension does not occur when the fuel injectors are located close to the inlet valves.

There are exceptions to this, however. Some vehicles, such as the 1992 and 1993 Fox-body Mustangs, do use such as a system even though they have multi-port fuel injection, presumably to help the air-fuel mixture burn at the proper rate in cold weather, as even though the fuel has finely atomized, it has not properly vaporized, and therefore flame propagation will be otherwise slower. These vehicles have a MAF sensor, Air Temperature sensor, and when equipped with the 2.3L 4-cylinder, two spark-plugs per cylinder. This combination ensures the air is just warm enough to vaporize the droplets and does very noticeably improve performance and emissions at the same time in cold, northern winter weather.

== Fuels ==
Heating of the intake air is specifically used for liquid fuels such as petrol that do not atomize easily under the temperature and pressure conditions present in the intake system of an engine prior to coming up to full operating temperature.

Fuels such as liquefied petroleum gas and natural gas do not require this heating, as they are in gaseous form in the intake, mix more effectively with the air, and cannot fall out of suspension.

== Disadvantages ==
While heating the inlet air provides a benefit by improving homogeneity of the inlet air and fuel, it has the disadvantage of reducing air density, which reduces the volumetric efficiency of the engine. The installation of a heated air intake system is hence beneficial to engine emissions but decreases maximum available power.

== Removal ==
Where heated air intake air cleaner assemblies are fitted to engines, it is a common perception that they reduce maximum engine power and it is consequently common for them to be removed and a more open-air cleaner assembly fitted in their place. This has the benefit of a marginal increase in power with the disadvantage of significantly increased emissions and, in some jurisdictions, making the vehicle illegal.
