= List of aviation mnemonics =

Mnemonics are used by aircraft pilots for the safe management of a flight.

== List of mnemonics ==
Abbreviation	Expansion	Definition
ABCDE	Airspeed, Best landing site, Checklist, Declare, Execute	engine failure procedure
ANC	Aviate, Navigate, Communicate	
ANDS (in the Northern hemisphere)	Accelerate North Decelerate South. SAND in the Southern hemisphere.	
APTATEN	Aircraft, Position, Time, Altitude, Type of flight plan, Estimated time of arrival, Name of next reporting point	
ARROW	Airworthiness certificate, Registration, Radio station license, Operating limitations, Weight and balance	required documents for flight
ATOMATOFLAMES	Airspeed indicator, Tachometer, Oil pressure gauge, Manifold pressure gauge, Altimeter, Temperature gauge, Oil temperature gauge, Fuel quantity gauge, Landing gear position indicator, Anticollision lights, Magnetic compass, Emergency locator transmitter, Safety equipment	minimum equipment list (VFR)
AV1ATE	Annual inspection/Airworthiness directives, VOR check, 100-Hour inspection, Altimeter, Transponder, Emergency locator transmitter	maintenance requirements
BLITTS	Boost pump, Lights, Instruments, Transponder, Takeoff time, Seatbelts	pre-takeoff checks
BUMMMFITCHH	Brakes, Undercarriage, Mixture, Magnetos, Master switch, Propeller pitch, Fuel, Flaps, Instruments, Temperatures, Carburettor heat, Hatches, Harnesses	pre-landing checks
CARE	Consequences, Alternatives, Reality, External factors	
CBSIFTBEC	Controls, Ballast, Straps, Instruments, Flaps, Trim, Brakes, Eventualities, Canopy	UK glider pre-takeoff checks
CCCC	Cram, Clean, Cool, Call	
CCCCCC	Calm, Compare, Climb, Contact, Confess, Conserve	
CIGAR	Controls, Instruments, Gas, Attitude, Run-up	pre-takeoff checks
CIGFT-PRSS	Controls, Instruments, Gas, Flaps, Trim, Propeller, Run-up, Shutters, Shoulder straps	
CISTRSC	Controls, Instruments, Spoilers, Trim, Release, Straps, Canopy	Canadian glider pre-takeoff checks
CRAFT	Clearance, Route, Altitude, Frequency, Transponder	instrument flight rules clearance checks
DECIDE	Detect, Estimate, Choose, Identify, Do	
DODAR	Diagnose, Options, Decide, Assign, Review	
FACTS	Flaps, Auxiliary fuel pump, Cowl flaps/Carburetor heat, Transponder, Switches	
FATPL	Fuel, Altimeters, Transponder, Pitot heat, Landing Light.	pre-takeoff checks
FLAREE	Flaps, Lights, Auxiliary fuel pump, Radar transponder, Emergency locator transmitter, Engine	
FREDA	Fuel, Radios, Engine, Direction indicator, Altitude	en-route checks
GOOSEACAT	Gas gauge, Oil temperature, Oil pressure, Seat belts, Emergency locator transmitter, Altimeter, Compass, Airspeed indicator, Tachometer	
GRABCARD	Generator, Radios, Altimeter, Ball, Clock, Attitude indicator, Rate of turn indicator, Directional gyroscope	
GUMPS	Gas, Undercarriage, Mixture, Propeller, Seat belts	pre-landing checks
HAMSACC	Holding, Altitude, Missed approach, Safety of flight, Airspeed, Communication, Climb	
HASELL	Height, Airframe, Security, Engine, Location, Lookout	checks before aerial manoeuvres
IMSAFE	Illness, Medication, Stress, Alcohol, Fatigue, Emotion	personal wellness checks
MARVELOUSVFR500	Missed approach, Airspeed, Reach holding fix, Vacate assigned altitude, Estimated time of arrival, Leaving holding fix, Outer marker, Unforecast weather, Safety of flight, VFR-on-top, Final approach fix, Radio malfunctions, 500 feet per minute	
MIDGET	Master, Ignition, Doors, Gust lock, Emergency locator transmitter, Tiedown	
MMM	Mixture, Mags, Master	
MPG	Mixture, Propeller, Green light	
NWKRAFT	NOTAMS, Weather, Known air traffic control delays, Runway lengths, Alternates, Fuel, Takeoff distances	
OODA	Observe, Orient, Decide, Act	
OWLS	Obstacles, Wind direction, Length, Surface	checks to assess an unprepared surface for a precautionary landing
PARE	Power, Ailerons, Rudder, Elevator	spin recovery technique
PAVE	Pilot-in-command, Aircraft, enVironment, and External	pre-flight risk evaluation (Note: Not to be confused with the military term.)
PAWT	Passengers, Airspace, Weather, Time	
PPP	Perceive, Process, Perform	
RAWFAT	Runway lengths, Alternates, Weather, Fuel requirements, Air traffic control delays, Takeoff distance data	
SAFETY	Seatbelts, Air, Fire extinguisher, Equipment, Traffic/Talking, Your questions	passenger briefing checklist
SPLITT	Strobes, Pitot heat, Lights, Ignition, Transponder, Time	
TEAM	Transfer, Eliminate, Accept, Mitigate	
TITPIT	Tune, Identify, Twist OBS knob, Parallel, Intercept, Track	Procedure for following VOR radial
TMPFFGH	Trim, Mixture, Pitch, Fuel, Flaps, Engine air ventilation, Hydraulic pressure. Avro Lancaster pre-takeoff checks.	
TTTTTT	Turn, Time, Tune, Transition, Talk, Test	
UNOS (in the Northern hemisphere)	Undershoot North, Overshoot South. ONUS in the Southern hemisphere.	to compensate for magnetic dip when turning
UPRT	Upset, Push, Roll, Thrust	upset recovery technique
WIRETAP	Weather, Instruments, Radios, Elevation, Timing, Altitudes, Procedure	

== See also ==
- Index of aviation articles
- List of aviation, avionics, aerospace and aeronautical abbreviations
- Pilot decision making § Mnemonics
- Military terminology
- List of government and military acronyms
