= Segar =

Segar may refer to:

- Segar (name)
- Segar LRT station, a Light Rail Transit station in Singapore

== See also ==
- Cigar (disambiguation)
- Seeger
