= Cigar (disambiguation) =

A cigar is a roll of tobacco.

Cigar or the Cigar can also stand for:

== As an acronym ==
- CIGAR (aviation), a mnemonic for pre-takeoff checklists (Controls, Instruments, Gas, Attitude, Run-Up)
- CIGAR string, a representation of sequence alignment in Bioinformatics (Compact Idiosyncratic Gapped Alignment Report)
- CII GUI Architecture

== People ==
- Delbert Daisey (1928–2017), American waterfowl wood carver and decoy maker known as "Cigar" Daisey
- Marvin Elkind (a.k.a. "the Weasel" or "the Cigar"), Jimmy Hoffa's driver and subject of The Weasel: A Double Life in the Mob, a 2011 biography
- Carmine Galante (1910–1979), American mobster also known as "Cigar"
- Paul McKinney (1925–2013), American poker player

== Race horses ==
- Cigar (horse) (1990–2014), an American Thoroughbred racehorse
- Cigar, a steeplechase horse that flourished around 1841

== Other uses ==
- Cigar (band), an American punk rock band
- Cigar Lake, Saskatchewan, Canada - see Cigar Lake Mine

== See also ==
- Cuphea ignea, a species of flowering plant also known as the cigar plant or cigar flower
- Lasioderma serricorne or cigar beetle, a species
- Olindias phosphorica or cigar jellyfish, a species
- Cookiecutter shark or Cigar shark, a species of dogfish shark
- Cigar wrasse, a species of marine fish
- Beroe (ctenophore) or cigar comb jellies, members of a genus of comb jellies
- Messier 82, also known as the Cigar Galaxy
- Cigar Bowl, a post-season American college football bowl game from 1947 to 1954
- Cigar Mile Handicap, American Throughbred horse race named after the 20th century horse
- Nick Popaditch (born 1967), American retired Marine Corps gunnery sergeant and political candidate known as the "Cigar Marine"
- Sigar
