= Dew point =

Temperature below which condensation occurs

The dew point is the temperature that air, of a constant absolute humidity and pressure, must be cooled to in order for the relative humidity to rise to 100%. This temperature is a thermodynamic property that depends on the pressure and water content of the air. When the air at a temperature above the dew point is cooled, its moisture capacity is reduced, and when the temperature passes below the dew point water vapor will condense, or precipitate, to form liquid water. When this occurs through the air's contact with a colder surface, the precipitate on that surface is dew.

The dew point is affected by the air's absolute humidity. The more moisture the air contains, the higher its dew point.

When the temperature is below the freezing point of water, the dew point is called the frost point, as frost is formed via deposition rather than condensation. In liquids, the analog to the dew point is the cloud point.

== Humidity ==
The dew point temperature is an important measure of humidity. As the dew point reaches 20 °C (68 °F), almost everyone feels "sticky". Thus the dew point is the best predictor of energy use for cooling in the summer.

If all the other factors influencing humidity remain constant, at ground level the relative humidity rises as the temperature falls; this is because the air's capacity to hold water vapor decreases, and less vapor is needed to saturate the air. The dew point temperature equals the air temperature when the air is saturated with water; in all other cases the dew point will be less than the air temperature.

In technical terms, the dew point is the temperature at which the water vapor in a sample of air at constant barometric pressure condenses into liquid water at the same rate at which it evaporates. At temperatures below the dew point, the rate of condensation will be greater than that of evaporation, forming more liquid water. The condensed water is called dew when it forms on a solid surface, or frost if it freezes. In the air, the condensed water is called either fog or a cloud, depending on its altitude when it forms. If the temperature is below the dew point, and no dew or fog forms, the vapor is called supersaturated. This can happen if there are not enough particles in the air to act as condensation nuclei.

The dew point depends on how much water vapor the air contains. If the air is very dry and has few water molecules, the dew point is low and surfaces must be much cooler than the air for condensation to occur. If the air is very humid and contains many water molecules, the dew point is high and condensation can occur on surfaces that are only a few degrees cooler than the air.

A high relative humidity implies that the dew point is close to the current air temperature. A relative humidity of 100% indicates the dew point is equal to the current temperature and that the air is maximally saturated with water. When the moisture content remains constant and temperature increases, relative humidity decreases, but the dew point remains constant.

General aviation pilots use dew point data to calculate the likelihood of carburetor icing and fog, and to estimate the height of a cumuliform cloud base.

Increasing the barometric pressure raises the dew point. This means that, if the pressure increases, the mass of water vapor per volume unit of air must be reduced in order to maintain the same dew point. For example, consider New York City (10 m or 33 ft elevation) and Denver, Colorado, United States (1610 m or 5280 ft elevation). Because Denver is at a higher elevation than New York, it will tend to have a lower barometric pressure. This means that if the dew point and temperature in both cities are the same, the amount of water vapor in the air will be greater in Denver.

== Relationship to human comfort ==
When the air temperature is high, the human body uses the evaporation of perspiration to cool down, with the cooling effect directly related to how fast the perspiration evaporates. The rate at which perspiration can evaporate depends on how much moisture is in the air and how much moisture the air can hold. If the air is already saturated with moisture (humid), perspiration will not evaporate. The body's thermoregulation will produce perspiration in an effort to keep the body at its normal temperature even when the rate at which it is producing sweat exceeds the evaporation rate, so one can become coated with sweat on humid days even without generating additional body heat (such as by exercising).

As the air surrounding one's body is warmed by body heat, it will rise and be replaced with other air. If air is moved away from one's body with a natural breeze or a fan, sweat will evaporate faster, making perspiration more effective at cooling the body, thereby increasing comfort. By contrast, comfort decreases as unevaporated perspiration increases.

A wet bulb thermometer also uses evaporative cooling, so it provides a good measure for use in evaluating comfort level.

Discomfort also exists when the dew point is very low (below around −5 °C or 23 °F). The drier air can cause skin to crack and become irritated more easily. It will also dry out the airways. The US Occupational Safety and Health Administration recommends indoor air be maintained at 20–24.5 °C (68–76 °F) with a 20–60% relative humidity, equivalent to a dew point of approximately 4.0 to 16.5 °C (39 to 62 °F) (by Simple Rule calculation below).

Lower dew points, less than 10 °C (50 °F), correlate with lower ambient temperatures and cause the body to require less cooling. A low dew point can go along with a high temperature only at extremely low relative humidity, allowing for relatively effective cooling.

People inhabiting tropical and subtropical climates acclimatize somewhat to higher dew points. Thus, a resident of Singapore or Miami, for example, might have a higher threshold for discomfort than a resident of a temperate climate like London or Chicago or an extremely dry desert climate such as Riyadh where low dew points are common. People accustomed to temperate climates often begin to feel uncomfortable when the dew point gets above 15 °C (59 °F), while others might find dew points up to 18 °C (64 °F) comfortable. Most inhabitants of temperate areas will consider dew points above 21 °C (70 °F) oppressive and tropical-like, while inhabitants of hot and humid areas may not find this uncomfortable. Thermal comfort depends not just on physical environmental factors, but also on psychological factors.

== Altitude and clouds ==
A rising air mass in the atmosphere will cool as the pressure reduces: its temperature will move closer to the dew point temperature. The relative humidity of this air increases as the pressure drops with the same amount of water vapor. This combination causes the dew point temperature to fall 0.2 °C per 100 m or 4.5 °F per 1000 ft. At the elevation where the dew point is reached condensation begins, creating clouds, or fog as it is called at low altitudes. Cumulus clouds tend to have flat bottoms marking the altitude where the temperature crosses the dew point. The condensation of water vapor into water droplets releases 600 calories of energy per gram of water, heating the surrounding air.

== Measurement ==
Measurement is done by specific devices called "dew point meters". These devices consist of a polished metal mirror which is cooled as air is passed over it. The dew point is revealed by observing the loss of clarity in the reflection cast by the mirror. Manual devices of this sort can be used to calibrate other types of humidity sensors, and automatic sensors may be used in a control loop with a humidifier or dehumidifier to control the dew point of the air in a building or in a smaller space for a manufacturing process.

| Dew point | | Relative humidity at 32 °C (90 °F) |
|---|---|---|
| Over 27 °C | Over 80 °F | 73% and higher |
| 24–26 °C | 75–79 °F | 62–72% |
| 21–24 °C | 70–74 °F | 52–61% |
| 18–21 °C | 65–69 °F | 44–51% |
| 16–18 °C | 60–64 °F | 37–43% |
| 13–16 °C | 55–59 °F | 31–36% |
| 10–12 °C | 50–54 °F | 26–30% |
| Under 10 °C | Under 50 °F | 25% and lower |

== Calculating the dew point ==
Graph of the dependence of the dew point upon air temperature for several levels of relative humidity.

A well-known empirical approximation used to calculate the dew point, T_{d}, given just the actual ("dry bulb") air temperature, T (in degrees Celsius) and relative humidity (in percent), RH, is the Magnus formula:
$$\begin{align}
\gamma(T,\mathrm{RH}) & = \ln\left( \frac{\mathrm{RH}}{\ 100\ } \right) + \frac{b\ T}{\ c\ +\ T\ }\ ;\\[8pt]
T_\mathsf{d} & = \frac{\ c\ \gamma(T,\mathrm{RH})\ }{\ b\ -\ \gamma(T,\mathrm{RH})\ }\ ;
\end{align}$$
where b = 17.625 and c = 243.04 °C. The values of b and c were selected by minimizing the maximum deviation over the range −40 °C to +50 °C.

The more complete formulation and origin of this approximation involves the interrelated saturated water vapor pressure (in units of millibars, also called hectopascals) at T, P_{s}( T ), and the actual vapor pressure (also in units of millibars), P_{a}( T ), which can be either found with RH or approximated with the barometric pressure (in millibars), BP_{mbar}, and "wet-bulb" temperature, T_{wet} is (unless declared otherwise, all temperatures are expressed in degrees Celsius):
$$\begin{align}
P_\mathrm{s}(T)& = \frac{\ 100\ }{\ \mathrm{RH}\ }\ P_\mathrm{a}(T) = a\ e^{\frac{b\ T}{\ c\ +\ T\ }}\ ; \\[8pt]
P_\mathrm{a}(T) & = \frac\mathrm{RH}{100}\ P_\mathrm{s}(T) = a\ e^{\gamma(T,\mathrm{RH})} \\[8pt]
&\approx P_\mathrm{s}(T_\mathrm{w}) - \mathrm{BP}_\mathsf{mbar}\ 0.00066\ \left( 1 + 0.00115\ T_\mathsf{wet} \right) \left( T - T_\mathsf{wet} \right)\ ;\\[8pt]
T_\mathsf{d} & = \frac{\ c\ \ln\frac{\ P_\mathrm{a}(T)\ }{ a }\ }{\ b - \ln\frac{\ P_\mathrm{a}(T)\ }{ a } }\ ;
\end{align}$$

For greater accuracy, water's saturation pressure can be modeled using the Arden Buck equation instead of the Magnus equation. This is known as the Bögel modification and introduces a fourth constant, $d$. These enhanced approximations are marked below with a subscript $\mathrm m$:
$$\begin{align}
P_\mathrm{s,m}(T) & = a\ e^{\left( b\ -\ \frac{\ T\ }{ d } \right) \left(\frac{ T }{\ c\ +\ T\ }\right)}\ ;\\[8pt]
\gamma_\mathrm{m}(T,\mathrm{RH}) &= \ln\left(\frac{\ \mathrm{RH}\ }{\ 100\ }\ e^{\left( b\ -\ \frac{\ T\ }{ d } \right) \left(\frac{ T }{\ c\ +\ T\ }\right)} \right)\ ; \\[8pt]
T_\mathsf{d} & = \frac{\ c\ \ln\frac{\ P_\mathrm{a}(T)\ }{ a }\ }{\ b - \ln\frac{\ P_\mathrm{a}(T)\ }{ a }\ } = \frac{\ c\ \ln\left( \frac{\ \mathrm{RH}\ }{\ 100\ }\frac{\ P_\mathrm{s,m}(T)\ }{ a }\right)\ }{\ b\ -\ \ln\left(\frac{\ \mathrm{RH}\ }{\ 100\ } \frac{\ P_\mathrm{s,m}(T)\ }{ a }\right)\ } = \frac{\ c\ \gamma_{\mathrm m}(T,\mathrm{RH})\ }{\ b\ -\ \gamma_{\mathrm m}(T,\mathrm{RH})\ };
\end{align}$$
where

- a = 6.1121 mbar , b = 18.678 , c = 257.14 °C , d = 234.5 °C.

There are several different constant sets in use. The ones used in NOAA's presentation are taken from a 1980 paper by David Bolton in the Monthly Weather Review:

- a = 6.112 mbar, b = 17.67, c = 243.5 °C.

These valuations provide a maximum error of 0.1%, for −30 °C ≤ T ≤ 35°C and 1% < RH < 100% . Also noteworthy is the Sonntag1990,

- a = 6.112 mbar , b = 17.62 , c = 243.12 °C ; for −45 °C ≤ T ≤ 60 °C (error ±0.35 °C).

Another common set of values originates from the 1974 Psychrometry and Psychrometric Charts.

- a = 6.105 mbar , b = 17.27 , c = 237.7 °C ; for 0 °C ≤ T ≤ 60 °C (error ±0.4 °C).

Also, in the Journal of Applied Meteorology and Climatology, Arden Buck provides several different valuation sets, with different maximum errors for different temperature ranges. Two particular sets provide a range of −40 °C to +50 °C between the two, with even lower maximum error within the indicated range than all the sets above:

- a = 6.1121 mbar , b = 17.368 , c = 238.88 °C ; for 0 °C ≤ T ≤ 50 °C (error ≤ 0.05%).
- a = 6.1121 mbar , b = 17.966 , c = 247.15 °C ; for −40 °C ≤ T ≤ 0 °C (error ≤ 0.06%).

=== Simple approximation ===
There is also a simple approximation that allows conversion between the dew point, temperature, and relative humidity. This approach is accurate to within about ±1 °C as long as the relative humidity is above 50%:
$$\begin{align}
T_\mathrm{d} &\approx T - \frac{\ 100-\mathrm{RH}\ }{ 5 }\ ; \\[5pt]
\mathrm{RH} &\approx 100 - 5\ ( T - T_\mathrm{d} )\ ;
\end{align}$$

This can be expressed as a simple rule of thumb:

For every 1 °C difference in the dew point and dry bulb temperatures, the relative humidity decreases by 5%, starting with RH = 100% when the dew point equals the dry bulb temperature.

The derivation of this approach, a discussion of its accuracy, comparisons to other approximations, and more information on the history and applications of the dew point, can be found in an article published in the Bulletin of the American Meteorological Society.

For temperatures in degrees Fahrenheit, these approximations convert to
$$\begin{align}
T_\mathrm{d,^\circ F} &\approx T_\mathrm{{}^\circ F} - \tfrac{\ 9\ }{25}\ \left(100 - \mathrm{RH} \right)\ ;\\[5pt]
\mathrm{RH} &\approx 100 - \tfrac{25}{\ 9\ }\ \left(T_\mathrm{{}^\circ F} - T_\mathrm{d,^\circ F} \right)\ ;
\end{align}$$

For example, a relative humidity of 100% means dew point is the same as air temp. For 90% RH, dew point is 3 °F lower than air temperature. For every 10 percent lower, dew point drops 3 °F.

== Frost point ==
The frost point is similar to the dew point in that it is the temperature to which a given parcel of humid air must be cooled, at constant atmospheric pressure, for water vapor to be deposited on a surface as ice crystals without undergoing the liquid phase (compare with sublimation). The frost point for a given parcel of air is always higher than the dew point, as breaking the stronger bonding between water molecules on the surface of ice compared to the surface of (supercooled) liquid water requires a higher temperature.

== History ==
In Ancient Greece, Aristotle considered that dew fell from the sky. During the Renaissance, Ferdinando II de' Medici built a hygrometer to track the temperature and wind conditions that lead to water formation.

In the 18th century, Charles Le Roy attempted to determine the dew point by pouring cold water into a glass container.

The first modern theory of dew was composed by William Charles Wells, who published his experiments in his 1818 Essay on Dew. Meteorologist John Aitken demonstrated in 1887 that dew comes from the earth or from the plants, and does not fall from air.

The highest dew point ever recorded on Earth is 35 °C (95 °F) (with a temperature of 42 °C (108 °F)), observed at Dhahran, Saudi Arabia, at 3:00 p.m. on 8 July 2003.

== See also ==
- Bubble point
- Carburetor heat
- Hydrocarbon dew point
- Psychrometrics
- Thermodynamic diagrams
