= Aircraft compass turns =

Aircraft manoeuvre

In aviation, aircraft compass turns are turns made in an aircraft using only a magnetic compass for guidance.

== Description ==
A magnetic compass aboard an aircraft displays the current magnetic heading of the aircraft, i.e., the aircraft's directional orientation relative to the Earth's geomagnetic field, which has a roughly north-south orientation. The compass can be used in turns to verify the aircraft is travelling in the desired direction at the conclusion of a turn. The nature of the instrument and the alignment of the magnetic pole of the earth cause the magnetic compass to have several significant limitations when used for navigation. A pilot aware of those limitations can use the compass effectively for navigation. The compass continues to operate despite failures in the electrical, vacuum or pitot static systems.

Compass turns (turns using the magnetic compass as the primary reference instrument) are not standard practice in modern aircraft. Compass turns are typically performed in simulated or actual failures of the directional gyro or other navigational instruments. A magnetic compass is a simple instrument when the compass is not moving and is on the earth. A magnetic compass installed in an aircraft is subject to compass turning errors during flight. Pilots must compensate for such errors when using the magnetic compass.

Most of the errors inherent in the heading indications of a magnetic compass are related to the compass' construction. An aircraft compass consists of an inverted bowl with a magnetized bar attached. The bowl is balanced on a low friction pin. The bowl and pin assembly is enclosed in a case filled with non-acidic kerosene. The magnetized bar tends to orient the assembly with the local geomagnetic field. The bar turns the visible bowl of the compass. The outside surface of the bowl includes markings to indicate a magnetic heading. As the aircraft (and the compass housing) turns, the bowl remains somewhat stationary with respect to the Earth due to the magnetic attraction. In summary, the aircraft is free to turn around the stationary bowl.

The standard practice when flying with a gyro-stabilized compass (or heading indicator) is to read the magnetic compass only while in straight and level unaccelerated flight. This reading is then used to set the gyro-stabilized compass. The gyro compass will read correctly in a turn, whereas the magnetic compass can't be read properly while turning. Thus the pilot will always ignore the magnetic compass while turning, but periodically check it in straight and level unaccelerated flight.

== Compass errors ==
Several types of error will affect the heading indication provided by a magnetic compass if the aircraft is not in steady straight and level unaccelerated flight.

=== Pitch limits ===
A limitation imposed by a compass' construction is that the balancing bowl's pin, which is connected to a pivot point, only allows, in most compasses, the bowl to tilt by approximately 18 degrees before it will touch the side of the casing. When this happens its freedom to rotate is lost and the compass becomes unreliable.

=== Magnetic dip ===
A second limitation is magnetic dip. The compass dial will tend to align itself with the geomagnetic field and dip toward the northern magnetic pole when in the Northern Hemisphere, or toward the southern magnetic pole when in the Southern Hemisphere. At the equator this error is negligible. As an aircraft flies closer to either pole the dipping error becomes more prevalent to the point that the compass can become unreliable because its pivot point has surpassed its 18 degrees of tilt. Magnetic dip is caused by the downward pull of the magnetic poles and is greatest near the poles themselves. To help negate the effect of this downwards force, the center of gravity of the compass bowl hangs below the pivot. Compass navigation near the polar regions, however, is nearly impossible due to the errors caused by this effect.

When in steady straight and level flight the effect of magnetic dip is of no concern. However, when the aircraft is accelerated or turned to a new heading the following two rules apply:

First, when on an easterly or westerly heading and the aircraft accelerates, the center of gravity of the bowl lags behind the pivot, making it tilt forwards. Because of magnetic dip the compass will show a false turn towards the north if in the Northern Hemisphere or vice versa a false turn towards the south if in the Southern Hemisphere. Also if the aircraft is decelerated the compass will show a false turn towards the south in the Northern Hemisphere and false turn towards the north in the Southern Hemisphere. The error is neutralized when the aircraft has reached its velocity and the magnetic compass will then read the proper heading. Pilots in the Northern Hemisphere remember this by the mnemonic ANDS: accelerate north, decelerate south. The opposite occurs when flying in the Southern Hemisphere. This error is eliminated while accelerating or decelerating on a heading of exactly North or exactly South.

Second, when on a northerly heading and a turn towards the east or west is made, the magnet causes the compass to lag behind the actual heading the aircraft is flying through. This lag will slowly diminish as the aircraft approaches either east or west and will be approximately correct when on an east or west heading. When the aircraft turns further towards South, the magnetic compass needle will tend to lead the actual heading of the aircraft. When a turn is made from south to an east or west heading the compass will lead the actual heading the aircraft is flying through, it will diminish as the aircraft approaches either east or west, and it will lag as the aircraft turns further towards North. This happens in a coordinated turn because of the bank of the aircraft and resulting bank of the compass. The North-seeking pole of the magnet is pulled towards the Earth's magnetic field in the turn. This results in an angular displacement of the compass. The magnitude of the lead/lag will be approximately equal to the aircraft's latitude. (An aircraft at 30° north latitude will need to undershoot 30° while turning directly north, and overshoot 30° while turning directly south). This guideline is based not on a standard-rate turn, but on a bank angle of 15°-18°, which would equal a standard rate turn at the airspeeds typical of light aircraft. The pilot community uses the mnemonic UNOS (undershoot North overshoot South) to memorize this rule in the Northern Hemisphere. In the Southern Hemisphere the mnemonic ONUS is used. Other mnemonics used in the Northern Hemisphere are NOSE (North Opposite, South Exaggerates), OSUN (Overshoot South, Undershoot North), and South Leads, North Lags. These are reversed in the Southern Hemisphere.

== Standard-rate compass turns ==
Standard rate turn is a standardized rate at which the aircraft will make a 360 degree turn in two minutes (120 seconds). Standard rate turn is indicated on turn coordinator or turn-slip indicator.

All turns during flights under instrument rules shall be made at standard turn rate, but no more than 30 degrees of bank. In case of vacuum-driven instruments failure (i.e. directional gyro, attitude indicator) the rollout to new heading is timed: let's say the aircraft is flying 060 degrees heading and it needs to fly new heading 360. The turn will be 60 degrees. Since the standard rate turn is 360 degrees in 120 seconds, the plane will need 20-second standard rate turn to the left.

In case of electrical instrument failure, which include turn coordinator or turn-slip indicator, the following formula will help to determine turn bank at which the turn will be made at standard rate: In order to calculate bank angle for a standard rate turn knowledge of airspeed must be known. The rule of thumb using airspeed requires that the last digit of the airspeed be dropped then add five. For example, if the airspeed is 90 knots, the bank angle would be (9+5=) 14 degrees. For 122 knots, it would be (12+5=) 17 degrees. The line of latitude is the maximum lead or lag a compass will have.

The following explanations are for the Northern Hemisphere.

For example, an aircraft flying at 45°N latitude making a turn to north from east or west maintaining a standard rate turn a pilot would need to roll out of the turn when the compass was 45 degrees plus one half of the bank angle before north. (From east to north at 90 knots 0+45+7=52) A pilot would begin to roll out to straight flight and on a heading of north when 52 degrees was read from the compass. (From west to north at 90 knots (360-45-7=308). A pilot would begin to roll the aircraft out of the bank at 308 degrees read from the compass to fly on a north heading. Making a turn towards south from west the pilot would have to roll the aircraft out of the turn when the compass was 45 degrees minus half the bank angle (from west to south at 90 knots 180-45+7=142, from east to south 180+45-7=218).

When turning to north from east or west the bank angle used to calculate the time to roll the plane out of the turn must begin at the greatest number of degrees or further away from north. Conversely for turns to south from east or west the bank angle is calculated to decrease the number of degrees to lead the roll out or closer to south.

Generally pilots will practice making these turns using half standard rate turns. This will decrease the bank angle so that it is half of the calculated bank angle. When turns are made at half standard rate the line of latitude will only cause the compass to have an error of half as much. So our new calculation using a half standard rate turn is as follows: (From east to north at 90 knots 0+22.5+3.5=26) the lead roll out heading read from the compass would be 26 degrees to fly on a north heading. (From west to north 360-22.5-3.5=334) The lead roll out heading read off the compass would be 334 degrees.

Turns made for other directions should be interpolated. For example, a left turn made from a heading of west to southeast (SE). The compass would initially show a heading that is correct as the turn gets closer to south the compass would indicate a lead heading of the greatest error, as the aircraft passes through south the error would decrease and show less of a lead. As the aircraft approaches southeast the error would only lead half as much as it did when the aircraft was rolling through south. If the turn was made using a half standard rate at 90 knots and the SE heading required to fly was 135 degrees the roll out heading would be 135-11.25+3.5=127 degrees. Hence a roll out heading read from the compass of 127 degrees would be used to actually fly the heading of 135 degrees.
