= FREDA =

FREDA is a mnemonic used in aviation, particularly light aircraft listing critical items for a pilot to check periodically, e.g. at each waypoint.

It stands for:

- Fuel - is there sufficient fuel and is the correct tank selected? Does the tank need to be changed or the fuel balanced?
- Radios - is the correct frequency set? Transmit an update on location if appropriate.
- Engine - are the temperatures and pressures OK?
- Direction Indicator - is it aligned with the compass?
- Altitude - is the altitude correct and is the correct pressure set on the altimeter?

== See also ==
- List of aviation mnemonics
