= CISTRSC =

CISTRSC (pronounced Sister-Sea) is a mnemonic used by some Canadian glider pilots to remember the sequence of actions required before take-off.

This preflight check was developed by the Royal Canadian Air Cadets for use on the Schweizer 2-33 training glider. The check is not applicable to other glider types that are more complex than the 2-33 and include features such as flaps. Like all mnemonics this check has become part of aviation culture and folklore.

B-CISTRSC:

- Ballast
- Controls
- Instruments
- Spoilers
- Trim
- Release
- Straps
- Canopy
