= GUMPS =

Aviation mnemonic

GUMPS is an acronym widely used by retractable gear aircraft pilots as a mental checklist to ensure nothing critical has been forgotten before landing. Its popularity is widespread, appearing in flight student curricula, FAA publications and aviation magazines.

Due to distraction and preoccupation during the landing sequence approximately 100 gear-up landing incidents occurred each year in the United States between 1998 and 2003.

== The checklist ==
GUMPS stands for:

- G – Gas (Fuel on the proper tank, fuel pump on as required, positive fuel pressure)
- U – Undercarriage (landing gear down)
- M – Mixture (fuel mixture set)
- P – Propeller (prop set)
- S – Seat belts and Switches (lights, pitot heat, etc.)

An alternative formulation replaces the "S" with a second P for pumps.

== See also ==
- BUMMMFITCHH - alternative pre-landing checks
- List of aviation mnemonics
