= PARE =

In aviation, PARE is a mnemonic for a generic spin recovery technique applicable to many types of fixed-wing aircraft, abbreviating the terms power, ailerons, rudder, and elevator.

== Overview ==
PARE stands for:

- Power: idle
- Ailerons: neutral (and flaps up)
- Rudder: full opposite to the spin and held in that position
- Elevator: forward

These inputs are to be held until rotation stops, then:

- Rudder: neutral
- Elevator: easy pull to straight and level or a climbing attitude

=== Details ===
The first step in the PARE spin recovery sequence is to reduce power to idle. The second step is to neutralize the ailerons (and retract the flaps, if deployed). The third step is to apply and hold full rudder in the opposite direction of the spin rotation. The fourth step is to displace the elevator control toward its neutral position (forward movement when recovering from an upright spin; aft movement when recovering from an inverted spin).

The elevator action must occur after the rudder has been fully applied and held opposite to the direction of rotation. In many airplanes, it is the combination of full opposite rudder plus the elevator movement that will terminate the rotation (full opposite rudder alone may not be sufficient to stop the rotation). How far the elevator control must be displaced depends on numerous factors, can vary from airplane to airplane, and can even vary in the same airplane under different spin conditions.

Recovery actions per the PARE acronym are applied sequentially until all four primary actions have been made.

When the rotation stops, the rudder is neutralized first, followed by a controlled pull on the stick/yoke to return the airplane to level flight.

== Precautions ==
The PARE checklist provides a convenient method for teaching and recalling the steps in the NASA Standard spin recovery procedure for typical, light, single-engine, general aviation airplanes. NASA Standard recovery actions were first introduced in 1936, and those recovery actions were verified again during an intensive spin test program conducted by NASA during the 1970s/80s using four single-engine airplanes representative of those in the broader general aviation fleet.

However, many airplanes can have unrecoverable spin modes, especially those airplanes specifically placarded against intentional spins. For example, regardless of the recovery actions taken by the pilot (NASA Standard or otherwise), there is no guarantee that spin recovery can be affected beyond the first turn in a spin in an airplane being operated in the Normal category.

== See also ==
- Spin
- Aerobatics
