= OWLS =

Aviation mnemonic

OWLS is a mnemonic used by general aviation airplane pilots to assess an unprepared surface for a precautionary landing.

Like all mnemonics this check has become part of aviation culture and folklore.

OWLS:

- Obstacles
- Wind direction
- Length of surface
- Surface condition and type
