= CBSIFTBEC =

Gliding checklist mnemonic

In gliding within the United Kingdom, CBSIFT BEC is the standard mnemonic to guide pilots through a series essential pre-takeoff checks.

Each letter in the acronym represents a specific component or procedure that must be verified to ensure flight safety

== Mnemonic breakdown ==
- Controls
- Ballast
- Straps
- Instruments
- Flaps
- Trim
- Brakes
- Eventualities
- Canopy

== Detailed checklist ==
=== Controls ===
Move each control individually, checking for full and free movements, with no restrictions.

Controls have full and free movements. Pilots usually use the 4 corners movement. pointing their joystick in each corner using the edge of their control area. One limit with this can be dependent on the other pilot's legs.

=== Ballast ===
Check to ensure the aircraft is being flown within the placard weight limits.

Ballast is to check the weight of the pilots and any removable ballast. The more weight the higher its maneuverability becomes but a higher loss of height due to weight. The aircraft operating manual or placard will indicate the acceptable range of weights in the front and rear seats. If a pilot is too lightweight, they may add a specialized weight to the underside of their seat.

=== Straps ===
Ensure the straps of both pilots are on and secure. If flying the aircraft solo, ensure the straps in the rear cockpit and will not interfere with any of the controls.

Straps on and secure G strap, waist straps and shoulder straps. The G strap helps the pilot(s) to handle high G's. These are also used to protect their heads for injuries. All straps can be disconnected via the twist-able knob which will sit above the crotch area.

=== Instruments ===
Ensure that where appropriate, the instruments are correctly set (i.e., altimeter set to zero or to field elevation, depending upon local procedures). Check that the instruments are reading correctly, no obvious malfunctions and the panel is secure. Also check that the electric power is turned on, and radio communication is established if using a radio.

=== Flaps ===
Not all gliders have flaps. If fitted, the flaps should be moved through their full range of movement, then set for take-off.

Flaps not fitted or Flaps have full and free movement and set for take-off

=== Trim ===
The trim lever, often green, should be moved through its full range of movement, then set for take-off.

Trim fully forward, fully back and set for take-off.

=== Brakes ===
The brakes, often the blue lever, should be opened fully and check they are symmetrical. Then close until half brakes and then check they are symmetrical. Close the brakes and check they are closed both sides. Finally lock brakes.

Brakes full and symmetrical, brake half and symmetrical. Brakes closed and locked.

=== Eventualities ===
In the event of a launch failure, the glider must be flown at the minimum approach speed established for the prevailing wind conditions (for example 50, 55, or 60 kt). When conditions permit, a landing ahead should be executed. If a landing ahead is not feasible, the glider must perform a downwind turn (using the appropriate side as indicated by the current wind) to complete an aborted circuit. Should a wing drop be observed, the cable must be released immediately, and a landing ahead should be attempted.

=== Canopy ===
Lower the canopy, close and lock it. Apply an upward force on the canopy to make sure it is secure.

Canopy down and locked

== History ==
Historically, the checklist was CB SIFT CBE but was changed towards the end of 2018 so that the canopy is the final item before take-off. This brought the checklist in line with common practice and acknowledged that pilots often want to leave the canopy open on sunny summer days, to avoid overheating, and on cold, humid winter days to avoid the canopy misting up.

In the late 1970s the RAF Cadet Gliding Schools in the UK used CB SIT CB.
