= BUMMMFITCHH =

Pilots' aircraft checklist mnemonic

BUMMMFITCHH is one form of a mnemonic used by pilots to remember the sequence of actions required when an aeroplane is on approach to land. A shorter version for simple aircraft is BMFFH; many variations exist for different aircraft types.

== The checklist ==
Many of the steps in the pre-landing checklist are double-checks to eliminate the possibility of unexpected failure of the aircraft. Other steps convert the aircraft from a configuration that is optimised for economical flight to one that is safe for landing. Since landing is the most dangerous stage of a flight, it is important to be pre-warned if an engine failure may be likely to occur or to deal with any problem at this point.

The checklist of actions is given below in its most complete possible form.

O-B-U-M-M-M-P-F-F-I-T-C-H-H

- O - Open carburettor heater
- B - Brakes free
- U - Undercarriage down and locked
- M - Mixtures
- M - Magnetos
- M - Master switch
- P - Propeller Pitch
- F - Fuel
- F - Flaps
- I - Instruments
- T - Temperatures and Pressures
- C - Close carburettor heat
- H - Hatches or doors
- H - Harnesses

=== Aircraft type examples ===
The pre-landing checks for the Supermarine Spitfire V, or 'Drill of Vital Actions' as the check was officially known was "U,M,P and Flaps".

UMPH: Avro Lancaster pre-landing checks. Undercarriage, Mixture, Pitch full fine, Hydraulic pressure.

== See also ==
- GUMPS - alternative pre-landing checks
- List of aviation mnemonics

== Bibliography ==
- South East College of Air Training. Checklist - Piper Tomahawk PA-38, SECOAT, Lydd, Kent. (No ISBN)
- Tanner, John. The Spitfire V Manual (AP1565E reprint). London: Arms and Armour Press, 1981. ISBN 0-85368-420-0.
- Thom, Trevor. The Air Pilot's Manual 1-Flying Training. Shrewsbury, Shropshire, England. Airlife Publishing Ltd, 1988. ISBN 1-85310-014-5
