= Segar (name) =

Segar is both a surname and a given name. Notable people with the name include:

Surname:

- Charlie Segar, bluesman
- E. C. Segar (1894–1938), American cartoonist
- Joseph Segar (1804–1880), American lawyer
- William Segar (circa 1564–1633), portrait painter
- Rufus Segar (1932–2015), anarchist illustrator and graphic designer

Given name:

- Segar Bastard (1854–1921), English amateur football player and referee
