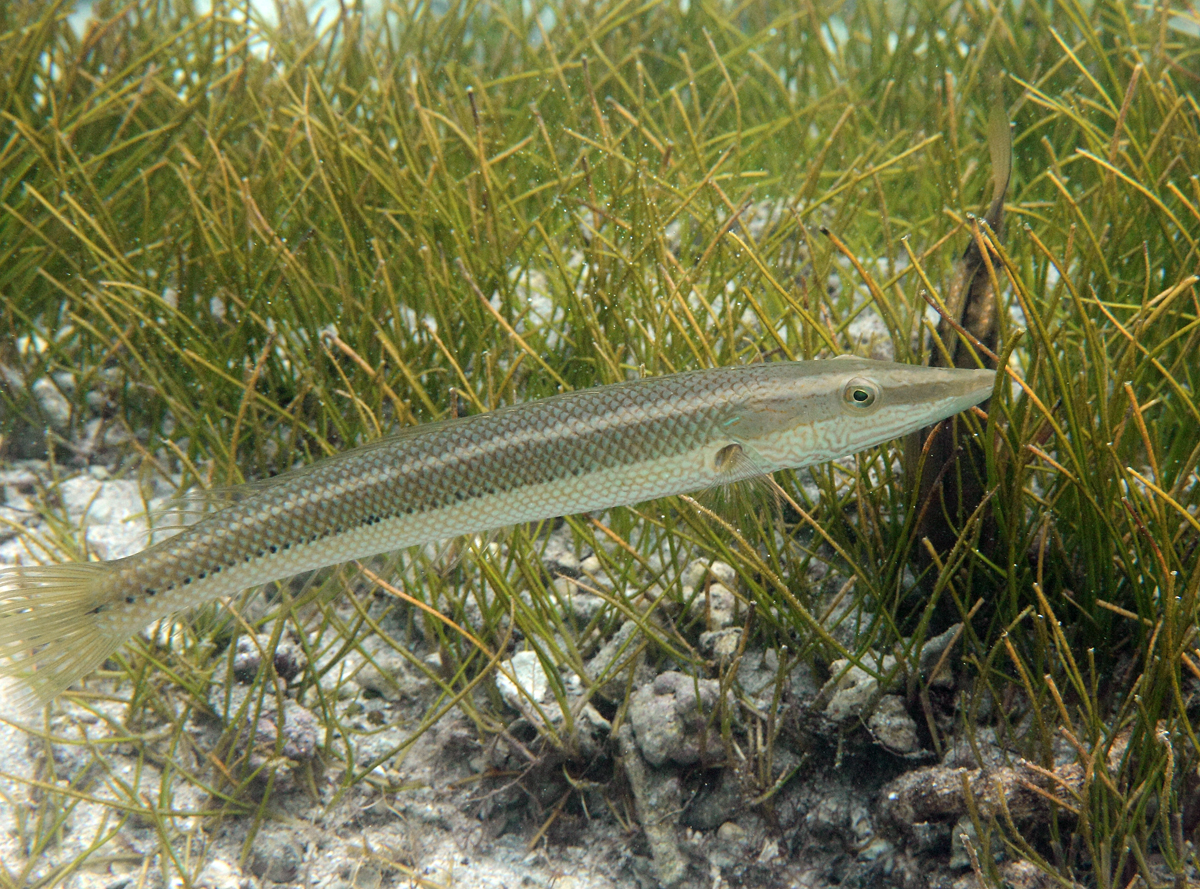

Conservation status
- Least Concern (IUCN 3.1)

Scientific classification
- Kingdom: Animalia
- Phylum: Chordata
- Class: Actinopterygii
- Order: Labriformes
- Family: Labridae
- Genus: Cheilio
- Species: C. inermis

Binomial name
- Cheilio inermis (Forsskål, 1775)

Synonyms
- Labrus inermis Forsskål, 1775; Labrus hassek Lacépède, 1801; Cheilio auratus Lacépède, 1802; Cheilio fuscus Lacépède, 1802; Labrus fusiformis Rüppell, 1835; Cheilio cyanochloris Valenciennes, 1839; Cheilio forskalii Valenciennes, 1839; Cheilio hemichrysos Valenciennes, 1839; Cheilio viridis Valenciennes, 1839; Cheilio microstoma Valenciennes, 1839; Cheilio ramosus Jenyns, 1842; Cheilio bicolor Bianconi, 1857; Cheilio udanad Montrouzier, 1857

= Cigar wrasse =

Species of fish

The cigar wrasse, Cheilio inermis, is a species of wrasse native to the Indo-Pacific Ocean. They are usually about 10cm in length, with some rare reports of cigar wrasses growing to be 50 cm. They have a long cylindrical, eel-like body shape referred to as anguilliform and have elongated dorsal and anal fins. They are often seen off the coast of Australia, the eastern seaboard of Africa, and India. They are primarily observed in, and occupy, reef habitats. Their coloration can vary widely to include yellow, brown, white, black, red, and stripes of all colors. Juvenile cigar wrasses have the same coloration as adults, but tend to have more pronounced stripes. It is unknown whether there is a difference in appearance between the female and the male.

This species is very understudied with only a few papers documenting their life history, distribution, and biology.

== Description ==
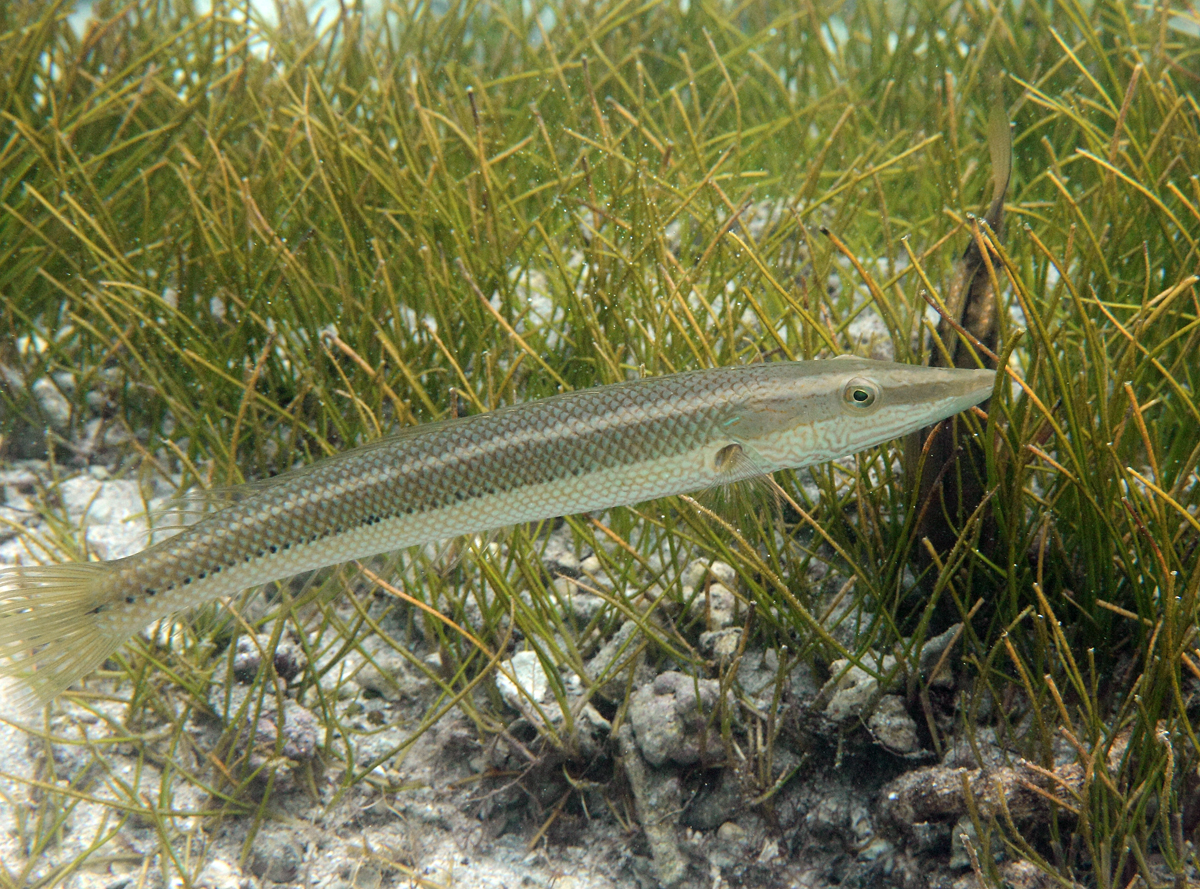
A Cheilio inermis.

It grows to an average length of 35 cm (14 in) but can reach up to 50 cm (20 in).

Young individuals are usually a mottled brown or green, sometimes with a broad lateral stripe. Rare individuals may be uniformly yellow. Large males may develop a bright yellow, orange, black, white, or multicolored patch on their sides behind their pectoral fins.

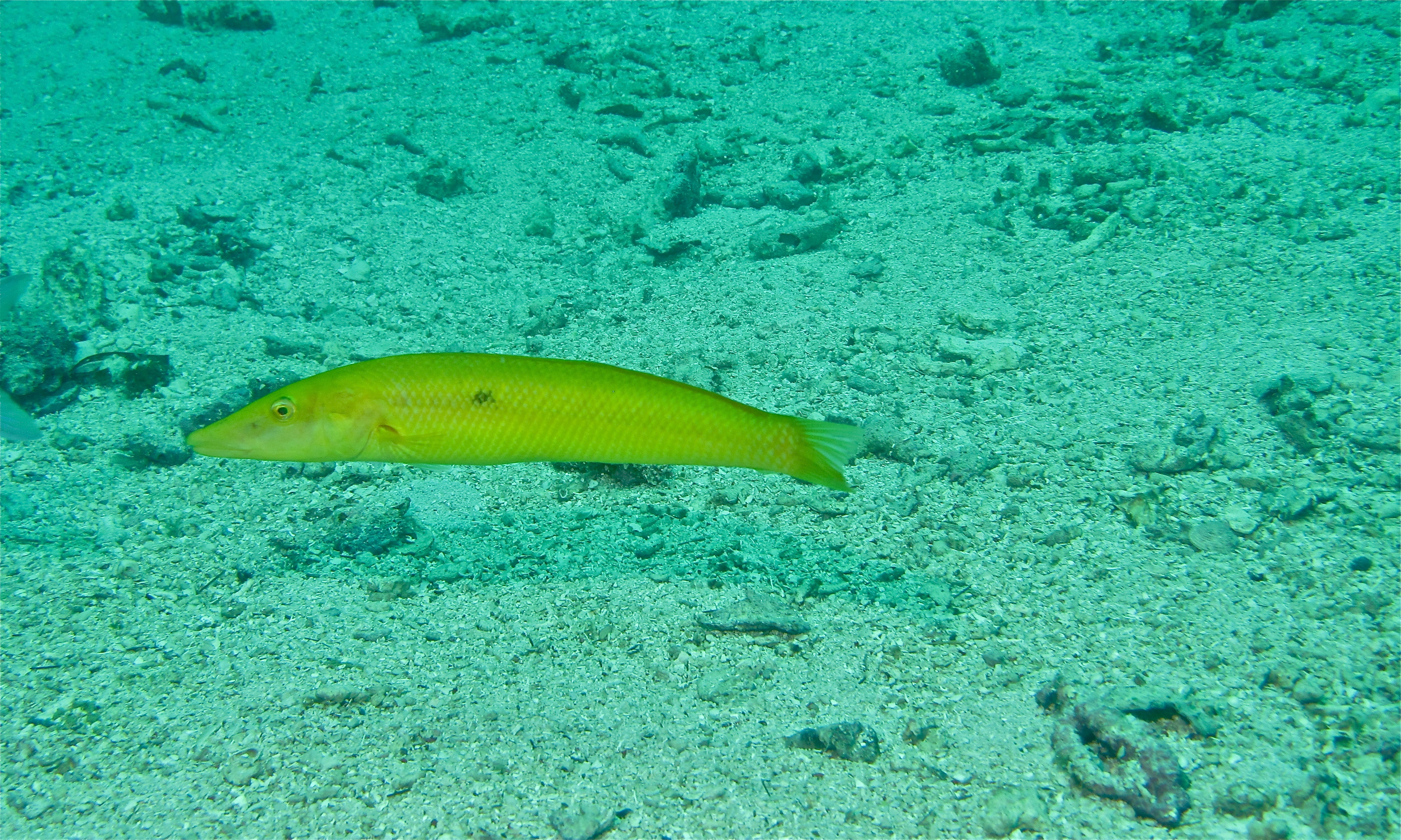
Cigar Wrasse adult

Due to their adult size and diet, they are rarely kept in the aquarium.

== Distribution ==
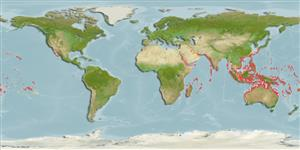
Known range of the cigar wrasse.

The cigar wrasse is native to the Indian and Pacific Oceans. Cigar wrasse live primarily in seagrass within shallow reefs. They have been observed in abundance feeding in canopy macroalgae habitats as well. They primarily feed during the summer, but remain in the same algae meadows during the winter. Both adults and juveniles are found in abundance in seagrass beds during all seasons. They can be found in soft coral reefs that are close to sandy seagrass beds as well as other habitats in close proximity to the seagrass beds they frequent. Cigar wrasses have a special affinity for finding and remaining in habitats that surround seagrass. It serves as their primary habitat, providing them protection from predators as well as nutrition. They have also been observed in large abundance along the perimeter of their primary habitat, feeding and hiding.

Other species of wrasses have been observed at a depth of 10 meters and it is unknown whether, or not the cigar wrasse differs in this behavior. Since wrasse tend to occupy more shallow areas such as reefs and algae meadows, they are normally observed close to shore and in large groups. Wrasse are relatively stationary fish and remain within a home range for their entire lives. For many species, including the cigar wrasse, they do not stray far from the seagrass bed where they hatched.

== Life History ==
Many instances of courtship across the family Labridae involve a male swimming in circles for prospective females approximately 1.8-2.4m above the sea floor. It has been observed that the male's wrasses dorsal and anal fins are depressed towards its caudal fin during this movement. When a female wrasse is interested, she will rise up in the water column and tilt onto one side. The pair will swim side by side and a cloud of gametes is resealed by the male, then the two separate. This behavior has been observed in many species of wrasse, but has not yet been seen in cigar wrasse. Nothing is known about the specific courtship behavior of cigar wrasses, or if it varies from the larger majority of wrasses who engage in the observed mating behavior.

Juvenile cigar wrasses remain in seagrass beds for the majority of their development. Juveniles are at risk of predation from larger fishes, specifically from the moon wrasse, Thalassoma lunare, which have been known to eat juvenile cigar wrasses in a single strike. Once they are grown into an adult, the cigar wrasse will often use the same seagrass beds to hunt.

It is unknown exactly how long cigar wrasses can live. Species of wrasses have wide ranging life spans from 9 years all the way up to 25 years. This makes it difficult to understand the lifespan of cigar wrasse as the few sources addressing lifespan give widely different estimates.

== Diet ==
Cigar wrasse diet depends heavily on their location. In Amitori Bay they have been observed feeding on gastropods and smaller fishes, while in Nagura Bay their diet consisted of mostly shrimp. While the body size of cigar wrasse can differ in populations across the Indo-Pacific, between 4.4cm to 14.8cm, all sizes are seen in each habitat; therefore, researchers do not attribute differences in diet to size.

== Evolution ==
Within the western Indian Ocean, cigar wrasse have been studied in order to determine how their small individual range affects their genetic dispersion. Because cigar wrasse stay in isolated populations in seagrass beds for the majority of their lives, the fact that they occupy such a large species range is interesting. Researchers used a method of species classification referred to as molecular taxonomy in order to determine if all cigar wrasse are the same species or not. Nuclear DNA and Mitochondrial DNA was extracted from cigar wrasses across the Indo-Pacific Ocean and analyzed. They found that cigar wrasse in Tanga, a coastal city in Tanzania, differ genetically from the rest of the species. Researchers had two theories for the genetic differences in the cigar wrasse off the coast of Tanga. Firstly, they thought that the differences could be due Oceanic currents moving cigar wrasse from their home ranges. Secondly, they theorized that it could be because some reefs are continuous, allowing other cigar wrasse to move along the shallow habitat, while others are broken up by rivers, forcing those populations into isolation. Cigar wrasse endemic to different portions of the Indo-Pacific do not genetically differ enough to constitute separating the species, but rather many sub-species may be occurring within the classification of cigar wrasse.

== Conservation Status ==
The conservation status of cigar wrasses is understudied, so their current conservation needs are limited by researchers' lack of knowledge. There are reports of cigar wrasse showing up as by-catch in nets off the eastern coast of Africa where they are using mosquito nets to fish. Since cigar wrasse are largely stationary fish, they appear in large quantities in the fine mesh netting. However, the effect it is having on their conservation status is currently unknown. The IUCN currently lists them at the status of Least Concern and their population trend is unknown. While the current trend is unknown, with the amount of cigar wrasse being caught off the eastern coast of Africa, it is possible their IUCN listing could change within the decade.

== Human Use ==
Many species of wrasse are cleaner fish, meaning they eat fish lice and other parasites off of larger fish. Fisheries use wrasse to remove parasites from both salmon and trout. The number of parasites removed through this method at one fishery in Norway between 2009 and 2010 is estimated at 1.4 million. It is unknown whether, or not cigar wrasse display this behavior in the wild, but wrasse are commonly used by salmon fisheries all over the world for this purpose. Because of their stationary behavior, it is easy for large amounts of wrasse to be collected for fisheries. This is a big threat to many species of wrasse as the number of fish caught to be used in salmon farms is much larger than the amount caught as by-product by fishermen.

== Gallery ==
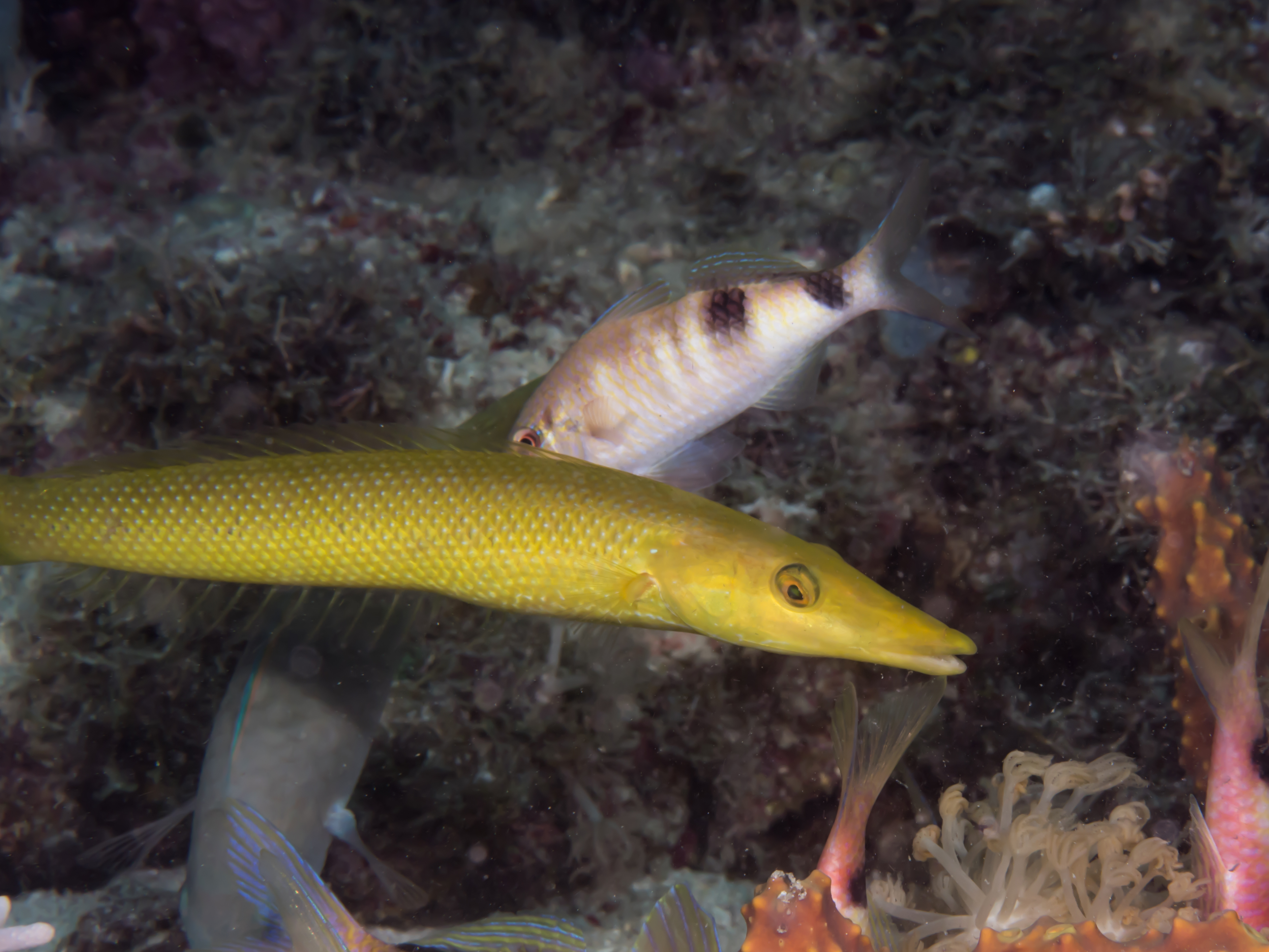

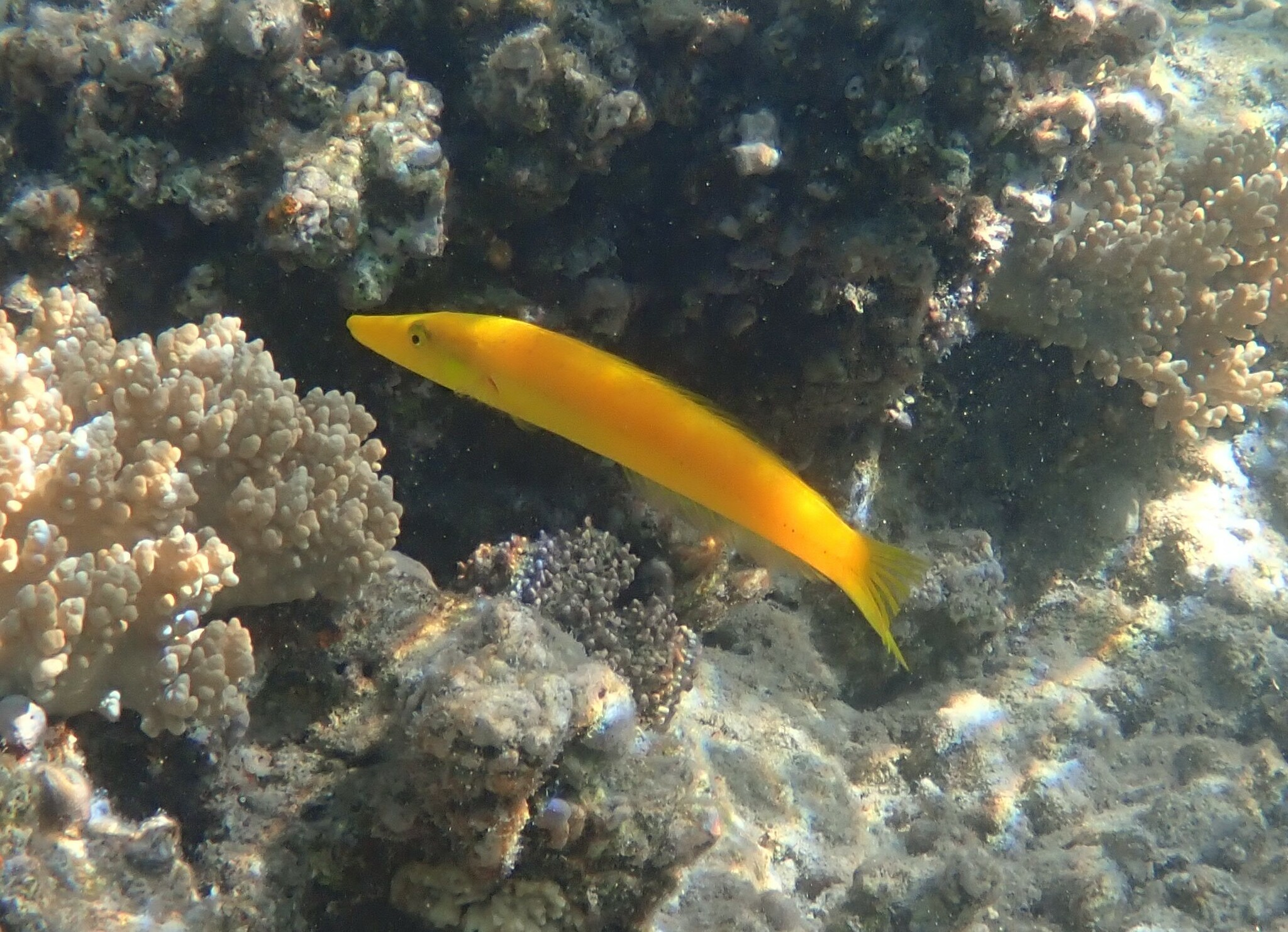

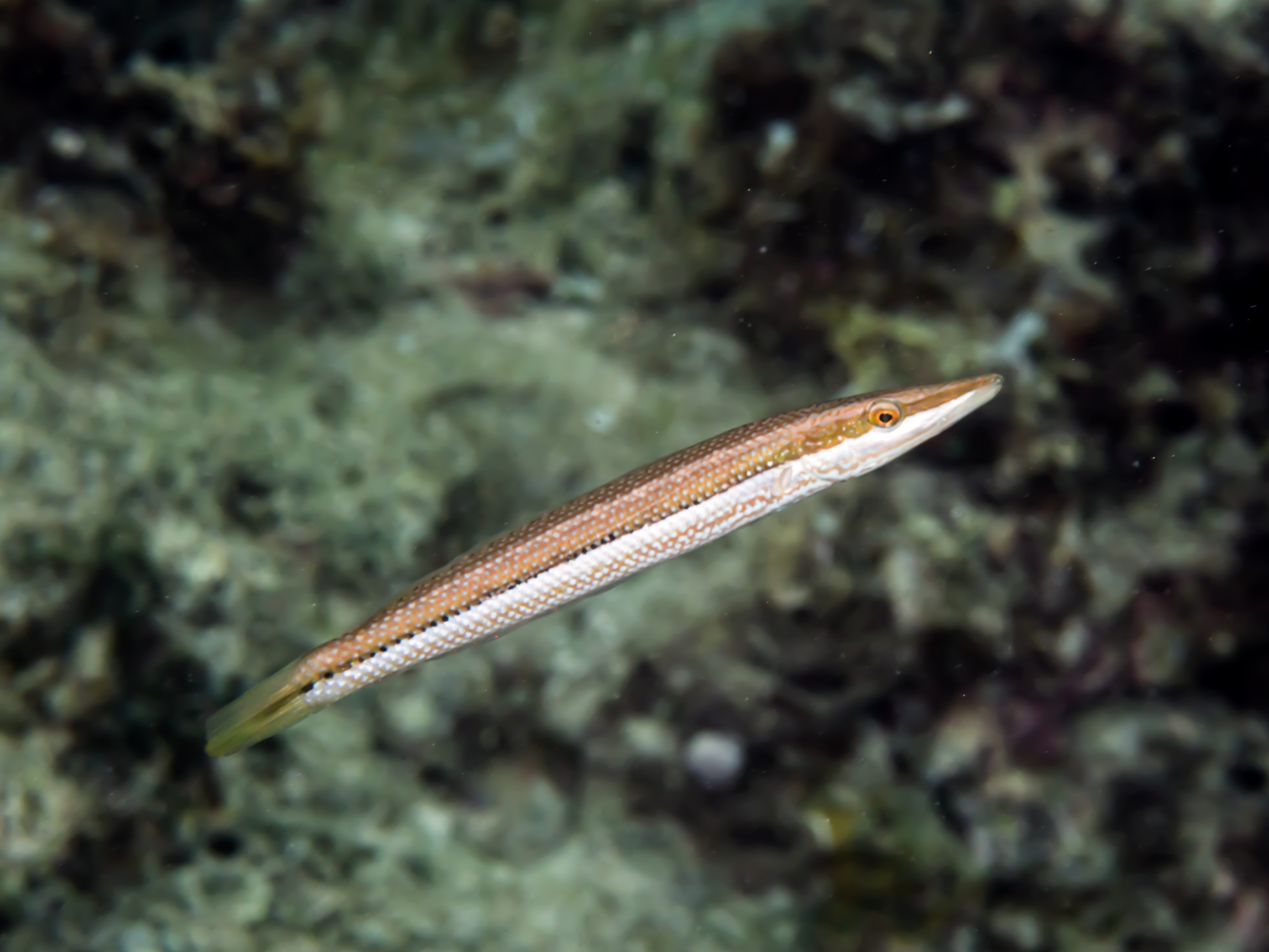
Juvenile
