= BLITTS =

BLITTS is a mnemonic used by some aircraft pilots to run an aircraft checklist during line-up or before lining up to takeoff.

== Definition ==
The mnemonic is interpreted as:

- Boost Pump - If the aircraft requires the fuel boost pump to be on for takeoff operations, this is the reminder to turn on this switch or otherwise enable the pump or check that it has been enabled,
- Lights - As required. While a beacon strobe would typically already be on, other lights such as the landing light, navigation lights and perhaps others may be desirable as well,
- Instruments - All instruments are set and ready for flight. What this entails will vary by aircraft and its specific installed equipment,
- Transponder - Prior to takeoff, the transponder typically must be set to 'on' and configured into a proper mode. Though some transponders will automatically activate into the appropriate mode based on the aircraft’s airspeed trigger, this point also serves to remind pilots to check the appropriate code is set on the transponder,
- Takeoff Time - It is considered a best practice to note the takeoff time for planning purposes; such as navigation and fuel burn, even if electronic instruments are being used,
- Seatbelts - Seatbelts and shoulder harness are secure.
