= CIGAR (aviation) =

CIGAR or CIGARS is a mnemonic that refers to a pre-takeoff checklist performed by general aviation pilots. The mnemonic stands for:

- Controls
- Instruments
- Gas
- Airplane secure
- Run-up.

Alternately:

- Controls
- Instruments
- Gas
- Attitude
- Run-up

Yet another version was used by the U.S. Air Force:

CIGarettes For The Poor Russian Soldiers:

- Controls
- Instruments
- Gas
- Flaps
- Trim
- Prop
- Radios
- Straps.
