= List of county routes in Steuben County, New York =

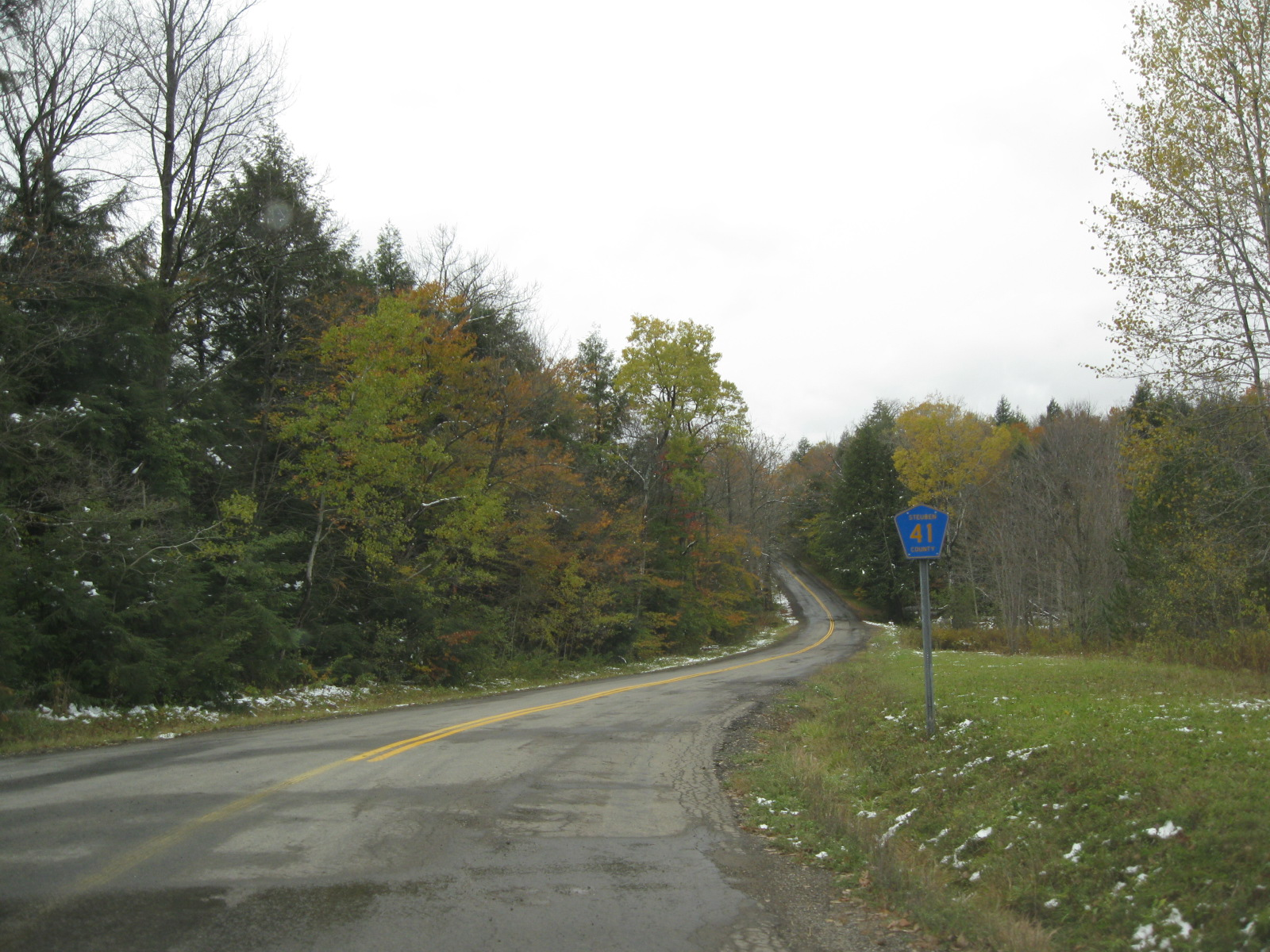
- Steuben County Route 41 reassurance marker, an example of the type used in the county.

Highway names
- Interstates: Interstate X (I-X)
- US Highways: U.S. Route X (US X)
- State: New York State Route X (NY X)
- County: County Route X (CR X)

System links
- New York Highways; Interstate; US; State; Reference; Parkways

County routes in Steuben County, New York, are maintained by the Steuben County highway department and signed with the Manual on Uniform Traffic Control Devices-standard yellow-on-blue pentagon shield. No county routes enter the cities of Corning or Hornell, and only two enter a village. Most primary through roads in Steuben County are either county routes or New York state highways.

== Routes 1–50 ==
Route	Length (mi)	Length (km)	From	Via	To	Notes
CR 1	8.47	13.63	Addison village line in Addison	Addison–Burr Hollow Road	CR 333 in Campbell	
CR 2	8.54	13.74	CR 119 in Addison	Cranberry Lake Road	CR 3 in Thurston	
CR 3	6.13	9.87	CR 1 in Addison	Goodhue Lake Road	CR 333 in Thurston	
CR 4	5.33	8.58	CR 1 in Addison	Curtis Hollow Road	NY 415 in Campbell	
CR 5	12.86	20.70	Addison village line in Tuscarora	South Hill–Clendenning Road	CR 73 in Lindley	
CR 6	6.56	10.56	NY 21 in Fremont	Neils Creek Road	NY 415 in Avoca	
CR 7	11.36	18.28	CR 105 in Avoca	Avoca–West Creek–Prattsburgh Road	NY 53 / CR 122 in Prattsburgh	
CR 8	6.97	11.22	Avoca village line in Avoca	Avoca–Wheeler Road	NY 53 in Wheeler	
CR 9	10.02	16.13	NY 415 in Avoca	Twelve Mile Creek Road	NY 53 in Prattsburgh	
CR 10	10.73	17.27	CR 119 in Cameron	Bath–Cameron Road	Bath village line in Bath	
CR 10A	2.65	4.26	CR 10	Averill Road in Cameron	CR 10	
CR 11	7.87	12.67	CR 24 / CR 333 in Thurston	Babcock Hollow Road	NY 960U at I-86 / NY 17 exit 39 in Bath	Formerly extended to NY 415 over NY 960U (ex-NY 866)
CR 12	7.32	11.78	CR 333 in Thurston	Savona–Thurston Road	Savona village line in Bath	
CR 13	7.82	12.59	Bath village line in Bath	Mitchellsville Road	NY 53 in Wheeler	
CR 14	14.21	22.87	CR 119 in Canisteo	Campbell Creek–Bakers Gulch Road	NY 415 in Bath	
CR 15	4.26	6.86	CR 14	Knight Settlement Road in Bath	NY 415	
CR 16	9.86	15.87	NY 415 in Bath	Telegraph Road	CR 20 in Bradford	
CR 17	10.96	17.64	NY 415 in Campbell	McNutt Run–South Bradford Road	NY 226 in Bradford	
CR 18	2.94	4.73	NY 226	Sonora–South Bradford Road in Bradford	CR 17	
CR 20	0.56	0.90	Old State Road	Bradford–County Line Road in Bradford	Schuyler County line	
CR 21	16.58	26.68	NY 36 / CR 31 in Canisteo	South Canisteo–Rathbone Road	CR 119 in Rathbone	
CR 22	4.25	6.84	CR 21	Allen Road in Cameron	CR 119	
CR 24	3.80	6.12	CR 119 in Rathbone	Cameron Mills–Risingville Road	CR 11 / CR 333 in Thurston	
CR 25	5.52	8.88	CR 24	Helmer Creek Road in Cameron	CR 10	
CR 26	6.52	10.49	NY 960M at I-86 / NY 17 exit 42	Meads Creek Road in Campbell	Schuyler County line (becomes CR 16)	
CR 27	7.93	12.76	CR 119 in Canisteo	Stephens Gulch Road	CR 70A in Howard	
CR 28	10.30	16.58	Allegany County line in Greenwood (becomes CR 21)	Purdy Creek–Shovel Hollow Road	NY 248 in Canisteo	
CR 29	3.27	5.26	Canisteo village line in Canisteo	Canisteo–Hornell Back Road	Hornell city line in Hornellsville	
CR 30	4.33	6.97	CR 21	Swale Road in Canisteo	Brooklyn and Lower Swale Road	
CR 31	8.12	13.07	NY 36 in Jasper	Milwaukee Road	NY 36 / CR 21 in Canisteo	
CR 32	6.53	10.51	NY 225	Caton–Seeley Creek Road in Caton	Chemung County line (becomes CR 78)	
CR 34	3.06	4.92	NY 225 in Caton	Whiskey Creek Road	NY 225 in Corning	
CR 35	10.27	16.53	Cohocton village line	Kirkwood–Lent Hill Road in Cohocton	NY 371	
CR 36	4.90	7.89	NY 415 in Wayland	Atlanta–East Wayland Road	NY 371 in Cohocton	
CR 37	0.78	1.26	NY 21	Bowles Corners Road in Cohocton	Livingston County line (becomes CR 36)	
CR 38	0.82	1.32	NY 21	Rowe Road in Cohocton	Ontario County line	
CR 39	0.60	0.97	CR 36	Atlanta–North Cohocton Road in Cohocton	NY 21	
CR 39A	0.63	1.01	CR 36	Grays Corners Road in Cohocton	NY 21	
CR 40	5.12	8.24	CR 40A in Caton	Spencer Hill Road	Corning city line in Corning	
CR 40A	2.57	4.14	CR 40	West Caton Road in Caton	NY 225	
CR 41	9.44	15.19	Painted Post village line in Corning	Corning–Hornby Road	CR 42 in Hornby	
CR 42	7.80	12.55	CR 41 in Corning	Shady Grove Road	Schuyler County line in Hornby	
CR 44	3.49	5.62	South Corning village line	Mossy Glen and River Roads in Corning	Chemung County line (becomes CR 10)	
CR 45	5.76	9.27	Gibson Road	Narrows Creek Road in Corning	Chemung County line	
CR 46	12.05	19.39	NY 21 in Fremont	Windom Hill–South Dansville Road	Livingston County line in Dansville (becomes CR 27)	
CR 47	0.65	1.05	CR 48	Stony Brook Glen Road in Dansville	CR 46	
CR 48	8.12	13.07	Arkport village line in Hornellsville	Oak Hill Road	NY 36 in Dansville	
CR 50	5.58	8.98	CR 46 in Dansville	Beachville–Kiefers Corners Road	NY 21 / CR 92 in Wayland	

== Routes 51–100 ==
Route	Length (mi)	Length (km)	From	Via	To	Notes
CR 52	1.19	1.92	Allegany County line (becomes CR 14)	Burns Road in Dansville	NY 36	
CR 53	2.19	3.52	CR 48	Dyer Road in Dansville	CR 46	
CR 54	3.25	5.23	NY 21	Dutch Street Road in Fremont	CR 55	
CR 55	3.61	5.81	CR 70A in Howard	Bacon School–Haskinville Road	NY 21 in Fremont	
CR 56	4.18	6.73	CR 70A in Fremont	Butchers Corners Road	Moss and Graves Hill Roads in Howard	
CR 57	2.62	4.22	CR 70A	Hornell Reservoir Road in Fremont	NY 21	
CR 58	2.04	3.28	Arkport village line in Hornellsville	Arkport–Fremont Road	NY 21 in Fremont	
CR 59	0.43	0.69	Allegany County line (becomes CR 22A)	Brown Cheese Factory Road in West Union	CR 60	
CR 60	8.46	13.62	NY 248 in West Union	Christian Hollow–West Union Road	NY 248 in Greenwood	
CR 61	8.98	14.45	CR 60 in West Union	Ridge Road	CR 28 in Hartsville	
CR 62	4.70	7.56	CR 61	Rock Creek Road in Greenwood	NY 248	
CR 63	2.83	4.55	NY 417 in Greenwood	Jackson Hill Road	CR 31 in Jasper	
CR 64 (1)	2.89	4.65	CR 28 in Hartsville	Ashbaugh Road	NY 36 in Hornellsville	
CR 64 (2)	0.41	0.66	NY 36	Ashbaugh Road in Hornellsville	Hornell city line	
CR 65 (1)	2.06	3.32	Hornell city line	Sanitarium Road in Hornellsville	CR 66	
CR 65 (2)	0.92	1.48	CR 66	Sanitarium Road in Hornellsville	NY 36	
CR 66	3.72	5.99	NY 21	Webbs Crossing Road in Hornellsville	NY 21	Overlaps part of NY Bike 17
CR 67	2.04	3.28	Allegany County line in Hornellsville (becomes CR 32)	Bishopville Road	NY 961F in Arkport	
CR 68	5.49	8.84	Allegany County line in Hartsville (becomes CR 42)	Crosby Creek Road	Hornell city line in Hornellsville	
CR 69	7.28	11.72	CR 14 in Howard	Buena Vista–Towlesville Road	CR 70A in Avoca	
CR 70	6.37	10.25	NY 962B at I-86 / NY 17 exit 35 in Howard	Brasted District Road	CR 6 in Avoca	
CR 70A	16.05	25.83	NY 21 / NY 36 in Hornellsville	Big Creek Road	NY 415 in Avoca	Formerly part of NY 70; part of NY Bike 17 east of Seneca Road
CR 71	4.52	7.27	NY 417	Jasper–North Jasper Road in Jasper	CR 21	
CR 72	3.19	5.13	NY 36	Dennis Corners Road in Jasper	CR 71	
CR 73	6.65	10.70	0.09 miles (0.14 km) south of CR 116 in Lindley	River and Indian Hill Roads	NY 417 in Erwin	Indian Hill Road portion is a former routing of US 15
CR 74	8.53	13.73	NY 53 in Prattsburgh	Prattsburgh–Pulteney Road	NY 54A in Pulteney	
CR 75	8.00	12.87	CR 74 in Prattsburgh	Glodes Corners–Browns Corners Road	Yates County line in Pulteney (becomes CR 33)	
CR 76	7.64	12.30	Hammondsport village line in Urbana	Hammondsport–South Pulteney and Thomas Roads	CR 74 in Pulteney	
CR 77	6.06	9.75	CR 74 in Prattsburgh	Elmbois Road	CR 76 in Pulteney	
CR 78	3.00	4.83	CR 74	Pulteney–Browns Corners Road in Pulteney	CR 75	
CR 79	0.42	0.68	NY 417	Ritas Way in Erwin	Cul-de-sac	
CR 80	4.70	7.56	CR 22 in Cameron	Tracy Creek Road	CR 21 in Rathbone	
CR 81	2.56	4.12	NY 417 in Woodhull	Tuscarora Creek–East Woodhull Road	CR 21 in Rathbone	
CR 82	9.21	14.82	NY 36 in Troupsburg	Troupsburg–Woodhull Road	CR 129 in Woodhull	Part east of CR 103 was designated as part of NY 274 from c. 1933 to the early 1940s (Note: NY 274 began at NY 21 (now NY 36) in Troupsburg and followed what is now CR 83, Log Road, CR 103, CR 82, and CR 129 northeast to NY 17 (now NY 417) in Woodhull.)
CR 83	1.21	1.95	NY 36	Log Road in Troupsburg	Old State Road	Designated as part of NY 274 from c. 1933 to the early 1940s
CR 84	10.61	17.08	CR 124 in West Union	Squab Hollow–Wileyville Road	NY 36 in Troupsburg	
CR 85	5.77	9.29	Pennsylvania state line	Freeman–Elkland Road in Tuscarora	NY 417	
CR 86	3.39	5.46	Pennsylvania state line	Van Vleet–Nichols Road in Tuscarora	CR 85	
CR 87	7.42	11.94	NY 54 in Urbana	Hammondsport–Wayne Road	Schuyler County line in Wayne (becomes NY 961L)	
CR 88	2.18	3.51	NY 54	Hammondsport–Pleasant Valley Road in Urbana	Hammondsport village line	
CR 89	2.17	3.49	CR 13 in Wheeler	Mitchellsville–Pleasant Valley Road	CR 88 in Urbana	
CR 90	4.13	6.65	Livingston County line (becomes CR 27B)	Patchinville–Perkinsville Road in Wayland	NY 21	
CR 91	0.94	1.51	CR 90	Perkinsville–Wayland Road in Wayland	NY 63	
CR 92	3.55	5.71	NY 21 / CR 50	Kiefers Corners–Orchard Comfort Road in Wayland	NY 415	
CR 93	0.46	0.74	Wayland village line	Wayland Canning Factory Road in Wayland	Livingston County line (becomes CR 31)	
CR 94	4.05	6.52	CR 87	Grove Springs Road in Wayne	NY 54	
CR 95	2.06	3.32	CR 87	Day Road in Wayne	NY 54	
CR 96	4.86	7.82	CR 16 in Bradford	Birdseye Hollow Road	CR 87 in Wayne	
CR 97	2.71	4.36	Schuyler County line (becomes CR 24)	Waneta Lake Road in Wayne	CR 87	
CR 98	4.32	6.95	CR 84	Rexville–Wileyville Road in West Union	NY 248	
CR 99	6.08	9.78	Pennsylvania state line	Woodhull–Holden Brook Road in Woodhull	CR 82	
CR 100	7.79	12.54	CR 99 in Woodhull	Borden–Pulteney Hill Road	NY 417 in Tuscarora	

== Routes 101 and up ==
Route	Length (mi)	Length (km)	From	Via	To	Notes
CR 101	3.07	4.94	Pennsylvania state line	Borden–Elkland Road in Woodhull	CR 100	
CR 102	4.09	6.58	NY 417	Woodhull–Hedgesville Road in Woodhull	CR 21	
CR 103	7.54	12.13	Pennsylvania state line in Troupsburg	Woodhull–Austinville Road	CR 82 in Woodhull	Part north of Log Road was designated as part of NY 274 from c. 1933 to the early 1940s
CR 105	2.40	3.86	NY 415	Wallace–West Creek Road in Avoca	Avoca village line	
CR 106	5.58	8.98	CR 73 in Lindley	Church Creek–Browntown Road	CR 32 in Caton	
CR 107			US 15 exit 4 / NY 417	Robert Dann and Scudder drives and Canada and Canada Sullivan Science roads in Erwin	US 15 exit 4 / NY 417	
CR 108	1.42	2.29	CR 28 in Hartsville	Dixon Road	CR 61 on Hartsville–Greenwood town line	
CR 109	6.33	10.19	Hornell city line in Hornellsville	Turnpike Road	CR 27 in Howard	
CR 110	1.85	2.98	CR 80	Richtmeyer Road in Rathbone	CR 119	
CR 111	1.81	2.91	Pennsylvania state line	Brookfield Road in Troupsburg	CR 84	
CR 112	2.20	3.54	CR 86	Van Vleet–Clendenning Road in Tuscarora	CR 5	
CR 113	9.17	14.76	NY 54 in Bath	Mount Washington–Argus Hill Road	CR 87 in Urbana	
CR 114	1.99	3.20	CR 96	Birdseye–Waneta Road in Wayne	Schuyler County line (becomes CR 23)	
CR 115	1.06	1.71	Pennsylvania state line	Lawrenceville–Presho Road in Lindley	US 15	Former routing of US 15
CR 116	2.42	3.89	Pennsylvania state line	Lindley–Lawrenceville Road in Lindley	CR 73	
CR 117	7.73	12.44	NY 248 in West Union	Rexville–Troupsburg Road	NY 36 in Troupsburg	Designated NY 232 from c. 1933 to September 1950.
CR 119	25.00	40.23	NY 36 in Canisteo	Canisteo River Road	NY 417 in Addison	Formerly part of NY 17F
CR 120	5.67	9.12	CR 73 in Lindley	Lindley–Caton Road	NY 225 in Caton	Formerly part of NY 13
CR 121	3.54	5.70	NY 21 in Wayland	Loon Lake Road	NY 962D at I-390 exit 2 in Cohocton	Formerly part of NY 371
CR 122	4.13	6.65	NY 53 / CR 7	Prattsburgh–Italy Hill Road in Prattsburgh	Yates County line (becomes CR 32)	Part south of McMichael Road was formerly part of NY 53
CR 123	3.87	6.23	CR 71 in Jasper	Jasper–Boyds Corners Road	CR 21 in Cameron	
CR 124	4.03	6.49	Allegany County line (becomes CR 19A)	Whitesville–Whites Corners Road in West Union	Pennsylvania state line	
CR 125	3.20	5.15	CR 333	Savona–Campbell Road in Campbell	Savona village line	Former routing of NY 2
CR 126	7.65	12.31	NY 36 in Troupsburg	Troupsburg–Highup Road	NY 417 in Greenwood	
CR 127	3.91	6.29	Pennsylvania state line	Camp Brook Road in Woodhull	CR 100	
CR 128	1.54	2.48	Canisteo village line	Canisteo–Canisteo Center Road in Canisteo	CR 119	
CR 129	2.58	4.15	NY 417	Woodhull–East Woodhull Road in Woodhull	NY 417	Part north of CR 82 was designated as part of NY 274 from c. 1933 to the early 1940s
CR 333	8.10	13.04	CR 11 / CR 24 in Thurston	Campbell–Risingville Road	NY 415 in Campbell	Formerly NY 333; highway transferred to Steuben County on April 1, 1997
CR 415			Meads Creek Road (NY 960M) in Erwin	Unnamed road	CR 11 in Bath	Entire length overlapped with NY 415; transferred to state on April 1, 1997

== See also ==
- County routes in New York
- List of former state routes in New York (201–300)
