= New York State Route 333 =

Highway in New York

New York State Route 333
- NY 333 in red

Route information
- Maintained by NYSDOT
- Length: 8.12 mi (13.07 km)
- Existed: 1930–April 1, 1997

Major junctions
- West end: CR 11 / CR 24 in Thurston
- NY 15 / NY 17 / Southern Tier Expressway in Campbell
- East end: NY 415 in Campbell

Location
- Country: United States
- State: New York
- Counties: Steuben

Highway system
- New York Highways; Interstate; US; State; Reference; Parkways
← NY 332	→ NY 334

New York State Route 333 (NY 333) was an east–west state highway located in southeastern Steuben County, New York, in the United States. The western terminus of the route was at an intersection with County Route 11 (CR 11) and CR 24 in Risingville, a hamlet within the town of Thurston. Its eastern terminus was at a junction with NY 415 in the town of Campbell. In between, NY 333 passed through the hamlet of Thurston. The route was assigned as part of the 1930 renumbering of state highways in New York and remained unchanged until April 1, 1997, when ownership and maintenance of the route was transferred from the state of New York to Steuben County as part of a highway maintenance swap between the two levels of government. NY 333 was subsequently redesignated as County Route 333.

== Route description ==
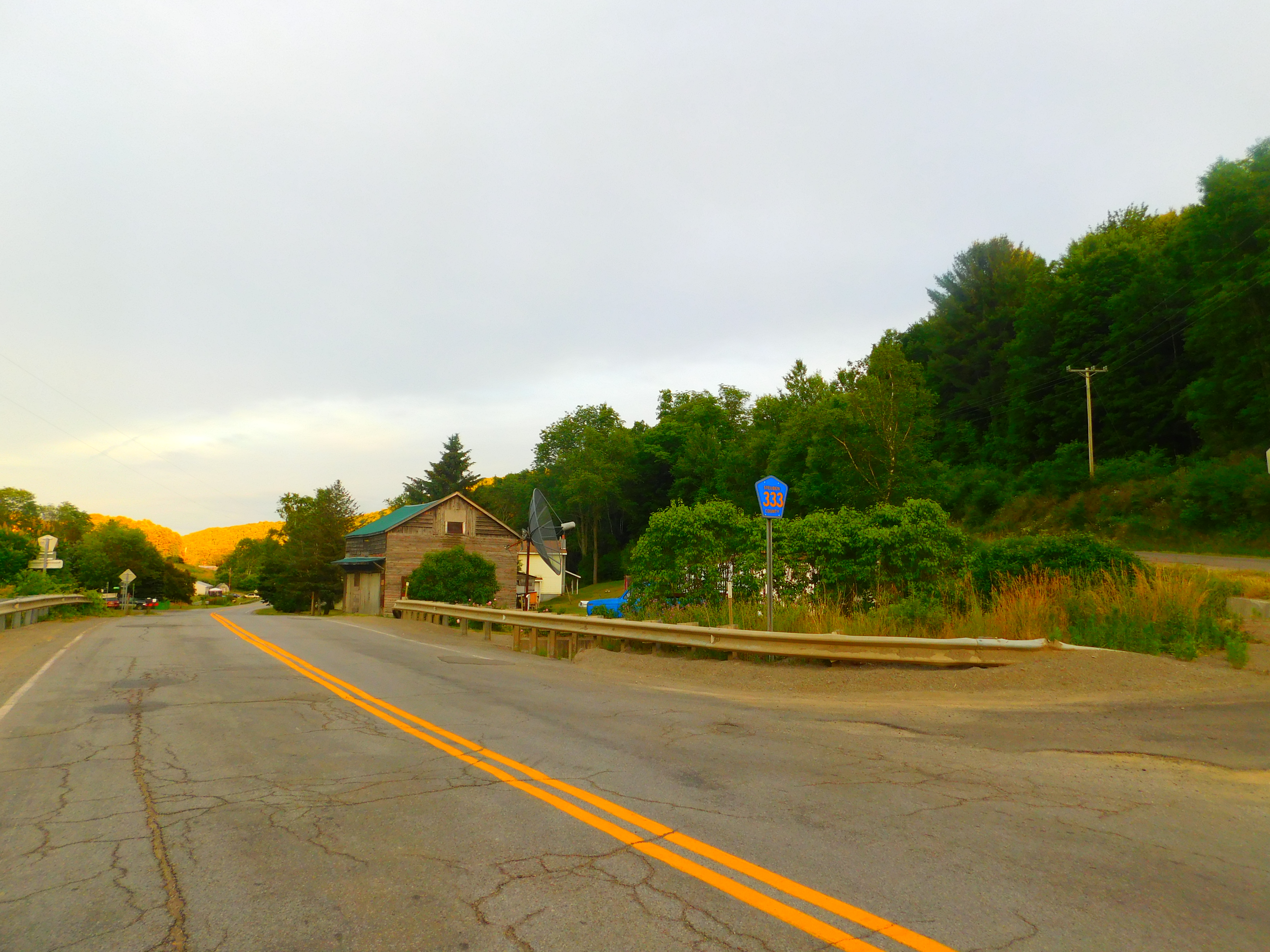
Former NY 333 at its western terminus, the hamlet of Risingville, in 2016

NY 333 began at an intersection with CR 11 and CR 24 in Risingville, an isolated hamlet within the Steuben County town of Thurston. It headed eastward, following Michigan Creek along the base of a valley surrounding the waterway. Due to the terrain of the area, NY 333 intersected only a handful of roads, one of which was Cranberry Lake Road (CR 2), a north–south highway that met NY 333 midway between the hamlets of Risingville and Thurston. The route continued onward, turning northeastward toward Thurston Pond and the small hamlet of Thurston at the eastern edge of the small lake. Here, NY 333 curved back to the east as it met Savona–Thurston Road (CR 12) in the western half of the community.

East of Thurston hamlet, NY 333 continued to run along the base of the Michigan Creek valley into the town of Campbell, where the valley met a larger valley surrounding the Cohocton River. The route proceeded eastward across the width of the latter valley, crossing over the river on its way into the riverside hamlet of Campbell, the largest community along NY 333. It proceeded eastward through the hamlet along Main Street to an interchange with the Southern Tier Expressway (then-NY 15 and NY 17) just east of the community. NY 333 ended just east of the Southern Tier at a junction with NY 415. The right-of-way also terminated at the junction.

== History ==
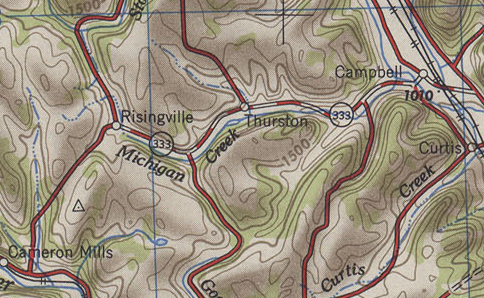
1948 USGS topographic map of the Thuston area with NY 333 at center

NY 333 was assigned as part of the 1930 renumbering of state highways in New York as a spur connecting U.S. Route 15 (US 15, now NY 415) in Campbell to the hamlet of Risingville in the town of Thurston. It remained unchanged until April 1, 1997, when ownership and maintenance of the route was transferred from the state of New York to Steuben County as part of a highway maintenance swap between the two levels of government. In the switch, NY 333 and nearby NY 432, both maintained by the state, were given to Steuben County in exchange for maintenance of NY 415 from Meads Creek Road in Coopers Plains (northwest of Painted Post) to Babcock Hollow Road in Bath as well as for maintenance of Hamilton Street (the original routing of NY 17) between US 15 and Gang Mills. NY 333 was redesignated as CR 333 as a result.

== Major intersections ==
The entire route was in Steuben County.

Location	mi	km	Destinations	Notes
Thurston	0.00	0.00	CR 11 / CR 24	Hamlet of Risingville
Campbell	7.58	12.20	NY 15 / NY 17 / Southern Tier Expressway	Exit 41 (NY 15 / NY 17)
Campbell	8.12	13.07	NY 415	
1.000 mi = 1.609 km; 1.000 km = 0.621 mi

== See also ==
- List of county routes in Steuben County, New York
