= New York State Route 415 =

State highway in Steuben County, New York, US

New York State Route 415
- NY 415 highlighted in red

Route information
- Maintained by NYSDOT
- Length: 42.83 mi (68.93 km)
- Existed: mid-1960s–present

Major junctions
- South end: NY 414 in Corning
- I-86 / NY 17 / Southern Tier Expressway / NY 352 in Erwin; NY 54 in Bath
- North end: NY 15 / NY 21 in Wayland

Location
- Country: United States
- State: New York
- Counties: Steuben

Highway system
- New York Highways; Interstate; US; State; Reference; Parkways
| ← NY 414 | → NY 416 |

New York State Route 415 (NY 415) is a state highway located entirely within Steuben County, New York, in the United States. It is a 42.83-mile (68.93 km) north–south trunk road that parallels in part, the Cohocton River, Interstate 86 (I-86) and I-390. The southern terminus of the route is at an intersection with NY 414 in the city of Corning. Its northern terminus is at a junction with NY 15 and NY 21 south of the village of Wayland. NY 415 serves several villages bypassed by the Southern Tier Expressway and I-390, such as Bath and Cohocton. The road also runs concurrent with New York State Bicycle Route 17 from its southern terminus to County Route 70A (CR 70A) in Avoca.

All of NY 415 from Painted Post west was part of U.S. Route 15 (US 15) from the 1930s to the 1960s. As sections of the Southern Tier Expressway and I-390 opened to traffic in the 1960s and 1970s, US 15 (later NY 15) was realigned to follow the expressway while its former at-grade routing became NY 415. NY 415 reached its present length, save for one minor extension in Corning, by 1977.

== Route description ==
=== Corning to Savona ===
NY 415 begins at an intersection with NY 414 (Centerway) in the Denmark section of the city of Corning. The route heads westward from the junction as a four-lane road named East Pulteney Street, passing north of the Corning Museum of Glass and serving a commercial area of the city. NY 415 changes names to West Pulteney Street five blocks later at a junction with Bridge Street; it also narrows from four lanes to two after meeting Dodge Avenue three blocks to the west of Bridge Street. Past Dodge Avenue, the highway gradually turns to the northwest, paralleling the course of the nearby Chemung River. The route soon passes into the adjacent village of Riverside, where it briefly widens to four lanes ahead of a partial interchange with the Southern Tier Expressway (I-86 and NY 17). Past the exit, NY 415 reverts to a two-lane right-of-way and passes under the Norfolk Southern Railway's Southern Tier Line (formerly the Erie Railroad's main line).

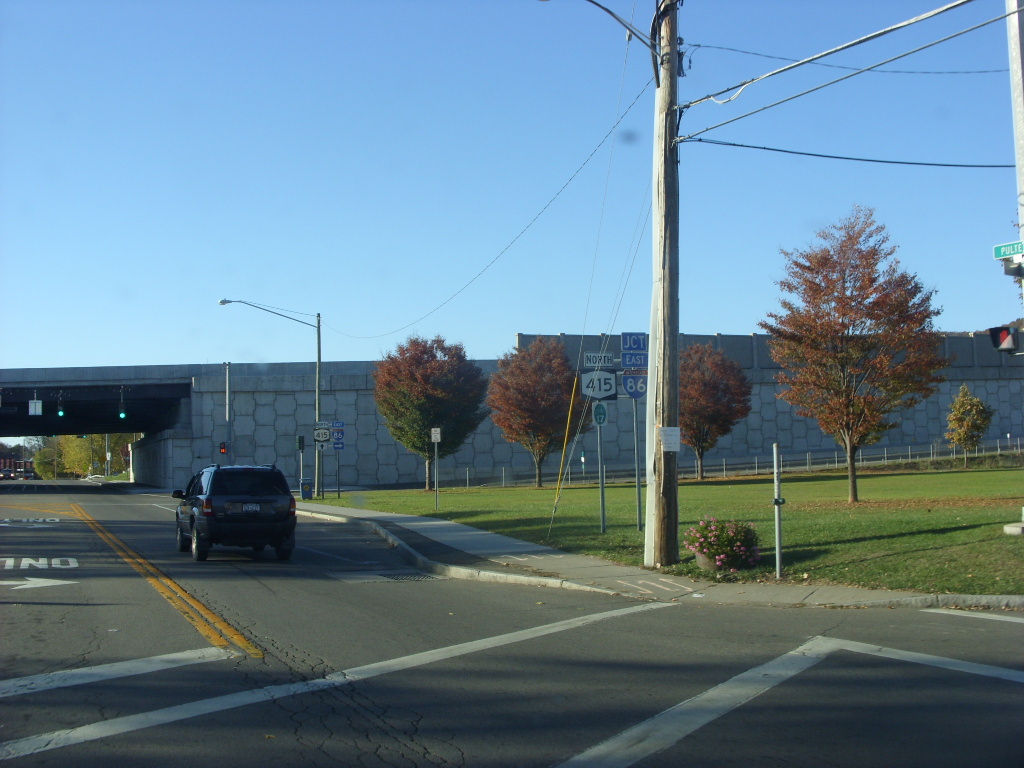
NY 415 north at I-86 and NY 17 in Corning

On the opposite side of the rail underpass, NY 415 changes names to East High Street. This moniker follows the route into the town of Erwin and its village of Painted Post, where the route gains a pair of wide shoulders and begins to traverse areas slightly more residential in nature. In the center of the village, NY 415 serves a cluster of businesses and intersects North Hamilton Street, designated as NY 417 west of this point. To the northeast, North Hamilton Street connects to CR 41. Past NY 417, NY 415 serves the predominantly residential neighborhoods that comprise western Painted Post. Just one block from North Hamilton Street, NY 415 changes names to Coopers–Bath Road at a junction with Steuben Street. The local street connects to the Painted Post Erwin Museum, housed in what was once the Painted Post station constructed by the Delaware, Lackawanna and Western Railroad.

The homes along the route become more scattered as NY 415 reaches the village limits. Outside Painted Post, the highway turns to the west, serving a handful of houses and two commercial buildings located adjacent to exit 43 of the Southern Tier Expressway. The route continues on through the town of Erwin, paralleling the B&H Rail Corporation's main line and the north bank of the Cohocton River as it heads northwestward across gradually less developed areas of Steuben County. NY 415 soon enters the hamlet of Coopers Plains, a small residential community centered around the route's junction with Meads Creek Road, which connects to exit 42 of the Southern Tier Expressway. Past exit 42, the state-maintained Meads Creek Road becomes CR 26. Past Coopers Plains, NY 415 enters the town of Campbell and makes a sharp turn to the north, crossing over the freeway to run along the undeveloped eastern side of the Cohocton River valley.

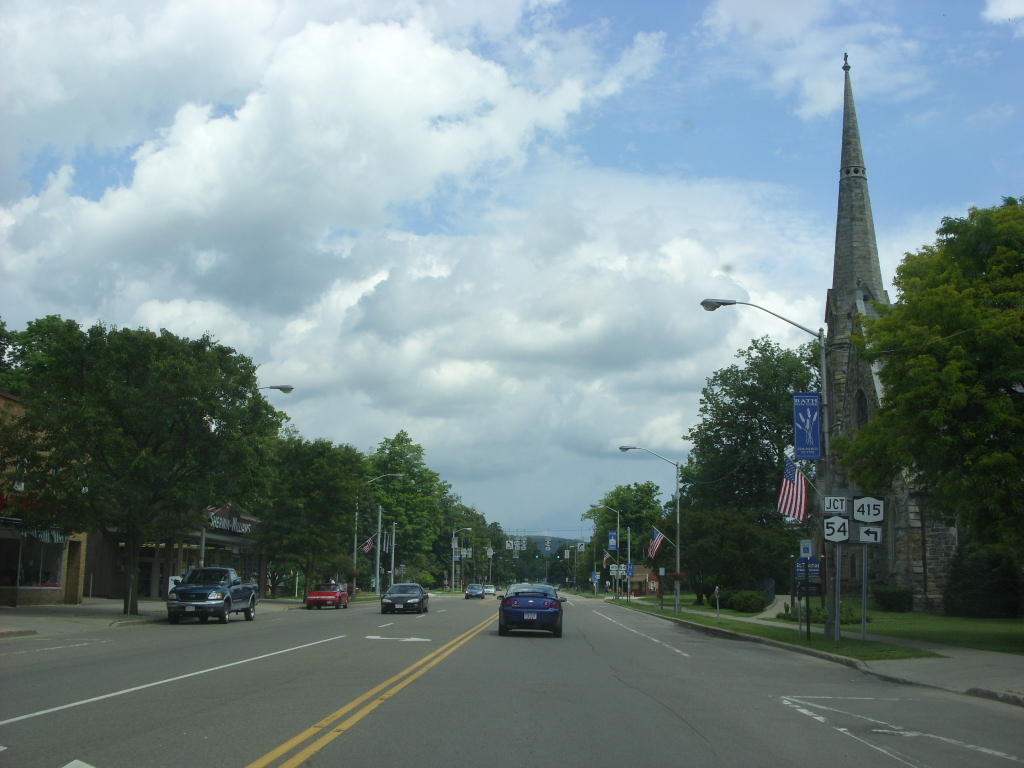
Approaching NY 54 on NY 415 northbound in the village of Bath

In Campbell, NY 415 runs through mostly wooded, rural areas, save for a handful of homes in hamlets along the route. In Curtis, located about 2 miles (3.2 km) from Coopers Plains, NY 415 connects to the eastern terminus of CR 4 (Curtis Hollow Road). The highway continues northward from Curtis, closely paralleling the Cohocton River for another 1.5 miles (2.4 km) to the hamlet of Campbell. NY 415 bypasses most of the community to the east; as a result, the route serves only a small number of homes on the outskirts of the community. As the highway heads through the area, it meets the east end of CR 333 (Main Street), which heads westward into Campbell's business district. The junction with CR 333 was the former eastern terminus of NY 333, a designation eliminated in 1997. NY 415 continues northwest from this point, intersecting with CR 17 (McNutt Run Road) before leaving the hamlet for less developed areas of the town.

=== Savona to Kanona ===
NY 415 heads northward across generally open fields along the base of the river valley to the town of Bath and its village of Savona. In the latter, NY 415 intersects with CR 125 (Little Acorn Lane) before entering the residential areas that comprise the bulk of the village. After three blocks of homes, NY 415 connects to NY 226 (Lamoka Avenue) in Savona's business district. After NY 226, NY 415 leaves Savona and turns to the northwest, running alongside the Southern Tier Expressway and the Cohocton River in a narrow section of the valley populated by farms. The gully widens significantly about 3 miles (4.8 km) northwest of Savona, at which point NY 415 leaves the Southern Tier Expressway and the river to follow a slightly more northerly routing through the area. It soon intersects with CR 16 (Telegraph Road) and Babcock Hollow Road (unsigned NY 960U) before entering residential areas on the eastern edge of the village of Bath.

The route continues into the village, changing names from Coopers–Bath Road to East Morris Street. Just inside the village limits, NY 415 passes a long stretch of residences and a former railroad right-of-way. Near the center of Bath, the route veers off East Morris Street and onto East Steuben Street, a parallel street one block to the north serving more commercial areas of the village. After five blocks, NY 415 turns northward onto Liberty Street, which carries the route for another two village blocks to the downtown portion of the village. Here, NY 415 meets NY 54, which switches from West Washington Street to Liberty Street at this point. NY 415 turns west here, overlapping with NY 54 along West Washington Street, a two-lane street serving mixed-use areas. The concurrency ends in a commercial area on the village's west side, where NY 415 turns northward onto West Morris Street while NY 54 proceeds west to the Southern Tier Expressway's exit 38.

After forking from NY 54, NY 415 proceeds northwest along West Morris Street, a two-lane commercial boulevard serving the western extents of the village of Bath. NY 415 soon begins to parallel the B&H main line once again, leaving the village for substantially less developed areas of the town of Bath. Roughly 2 miles (3.2 km) from the village, the route turns westward, passing under the Southern Tier Expressway to reach the Cohocton River and a junction with nearby CR 15 (Knight Settlement Road). Past CR 15, NY 415 heads northwest as a two-lane farm road to the riverside hamlet of Kanona, where NY 415 intersects with the southern terminus of NY 53 (Main Street). The route continues on, crossing the river and intersecting CR 14 (Campbell Creek Road) before leaving the residential community.

=== Kanona to Wayland ===
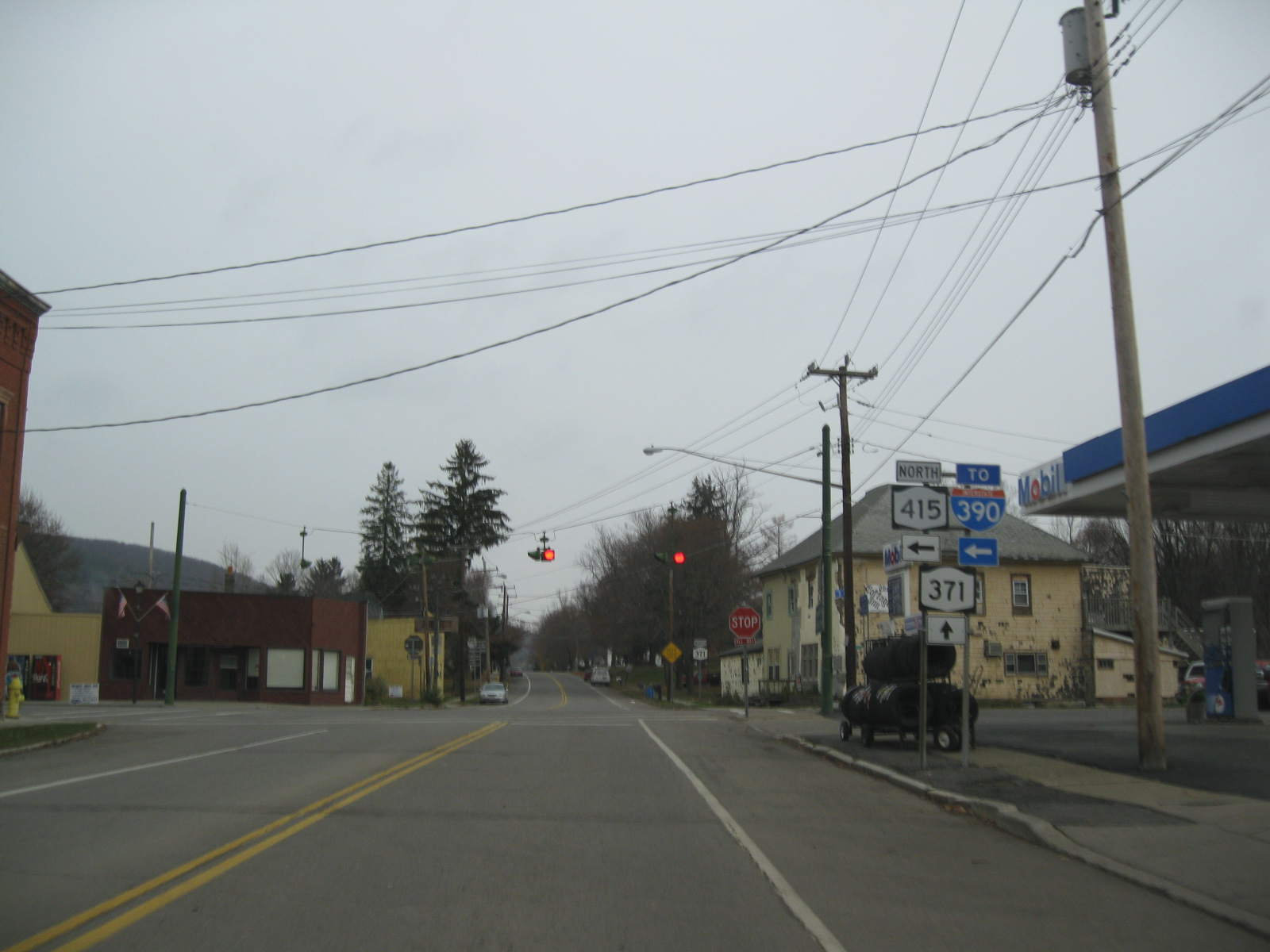
NY 415 northbound at NY 371 in the village of Cohocton

Outside of Kanona, NY 415 heads through the rural northern portion of Bath before crossing into the town of Avoca. In Avoca, NY 415 initially bends to the west, passing directly south of the complex interchange between the Southern Tier Expressway and the south end of I-390. After 1 mile (1.6 km), the highway curves northward, passing under the Southern Tier Expressway for the final time. Immediately north of the underpass, NY 415 intersects with CR 70A (Big Creek Road), a highway that was part of NY 70 until the mid-1970s. Continuing on, NY 415 reverts to a northwesterly track as it begins to parallel I-390 (the Genesee Expressway). The first connection between the two roads comes soon afterward by way of Michigan Hollow Road (unsigned NY 961J). Past this point, NY 415 makes a gradual bend to the north, bypassing the nearby village of Avoca to the west. Avoca itself is served by CR 7 (South Main Street).

After the village of Avoca, NY 415 parallels I-390 northwestward through the Cohocton River valley to the hamlet of Bloomerville, where CR 6 intersects NY 415 from the southwest. From here, NY 415 meanders its way northward along the base of the valley, crossing the B&H main line, I-390, and the river to reach the small hamlet of Wallace, centered around NY 415's junctions with CR 105 (Henderson Street) and CR 9 (Twelve Mile Creek Road). Another rural stretch brings NY 415 into the town of Cohocton, where the route closely follows the eastern edge of the valley to serve the village of Cohocton. Within the village, NY 415 gains the South Main Street moniker and becomes a two-lane residential street. At Cohocton's central business district, NY 415 turns westward and becomes Maple Avenue. The former right-of-way along Main Street becomes NY 371, which heads northward along North Main Street.

While on Maple Avenue, NY 415 remains a two-lane residential street as it crosses the B&H tracks once again near the Erie Railroad's old Cohocton station. The highway subsequently crosses the Cohocton River and serves another residential section of the village before meeting CR 121 (Loon Lake Road), another connector leading to nearby I-390. After CR 121, NY 415 turns northward out of the village, following the base of a narrow valley surrounding a tributary of the Cohocton River. Outside of Cohocton, the route becomes North Dansville Road and serves a small number of homes scattered across otherwise open fields.

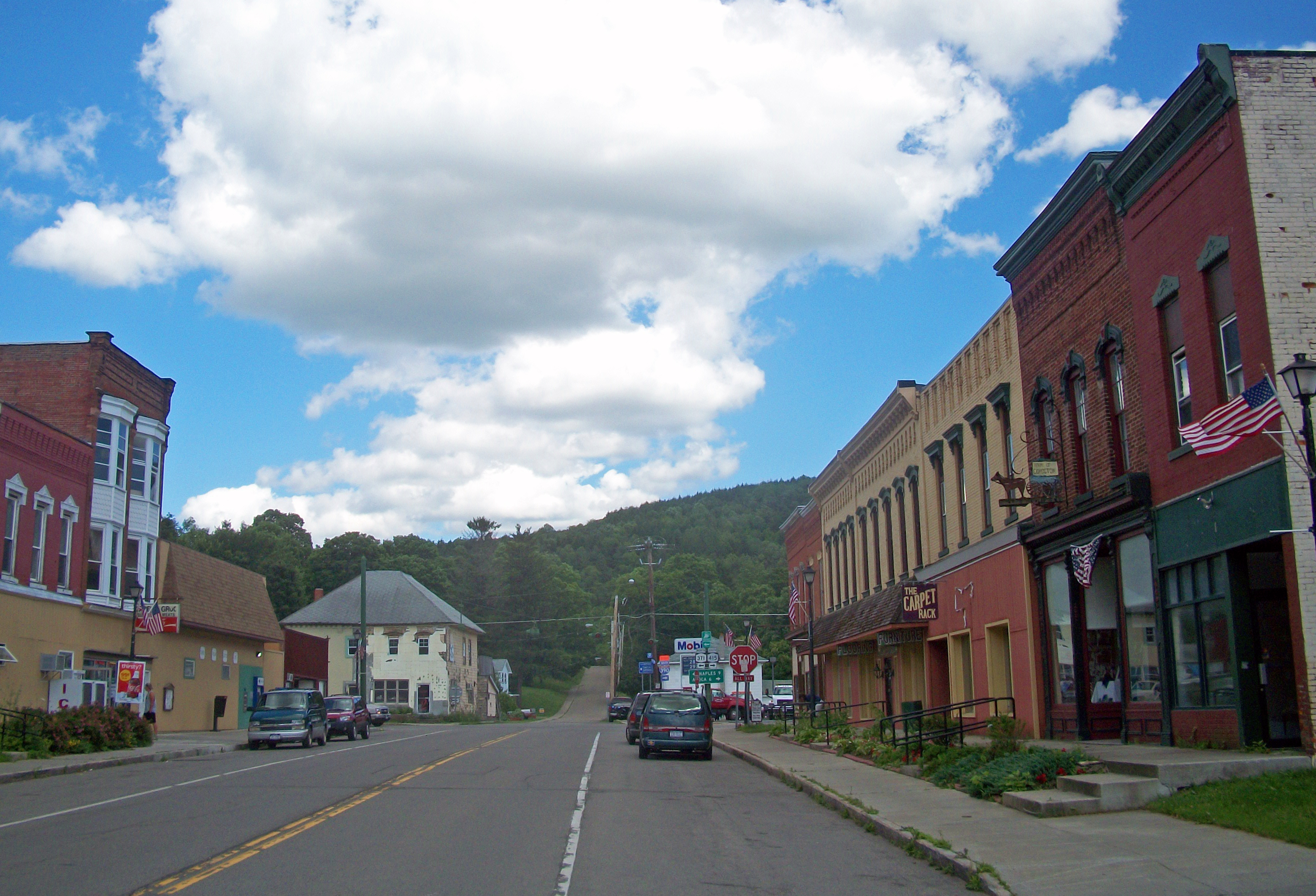
NY 415 southbound through the village of Cohocton

NY 415 continues to follow the creek valley for the next 5 miles (8.0 km), winding its way northwestward along the valley's curvy and undeveloped base. While NY 415 follows a series of prolonged east–west and north–south stretches that comprise the valley, the parallel I-390 takes a more linear path along the southwestern rim of the gully. Both roads soon enter the town of Wayland, where NY 415 connects to the western terminus of CR 36 at a gap in the valley's eastern side. West of this point, the small creek valley opens into the larger Cohocton River valley once more, allowing NY 415 and I-390 to follow closely parallel routings through the area. Just west of where the two valleys meet, NY 415 intersects CR 92 (Kiefers Corners–Orchard Comfort Road), which connects to an old alignment of NY 15, NY 415's predecessor.

I-390 and NY 415 continue westward across a rural, open area of the town of Wayland to I-390's exit 3, located 2 miles (3.2 km) south of the village of Wayland. The junction connects I-390 to NY 21 and serves as the south end of NY 15, which follows NY 21 northward into the village. NY 415 ends just north of the interchange at an intersection with NY 15 and NY 21. The right-of-way for NY 415 continues westward along the expressway as Michigan Road, which connects to CR 90 (Patchinville Road) and the hamlet of Perkinsville.

== History ==
In 1908, the New York State Legislature created a system of unsigned legislative routes that spanned the state of New York. Two highways assigned at this time were Route 4, which extended from Westfield to West Point, and Route 14, a route beginning at the western city line of Corning and ending at the southern city limits of Rochester. Route 4 entered the vicinity of Corning on Hamilton Street and followed Hamilton to its junction with Water Street. From there, it overlapped Route 14 east to the Corning city limits, where Route 14 ended and Route 4 continued alone through the city on Water and Pulteney Streets. Route 14, meanwhile, exited the Corning area on Water Street and followed what is now NY 415 through Savona, Bath, and Avoca to Cohocton. In Cohocton, Route 14 veered north to follow modern NY 371 instead.

The first set of posted routes in New York were assigned in 1924. In the vicinity of Corning, Route 4 became part of NY 17 while the portion of Route 14 from Painted Post to Cohocton was designated as part of NY 4, which also extended south to the Pennsylvania state line and north to Rochester via Wayland, Springwater, East Avon, and Henrietta. NY 4 was renumbered to NY 2 in 1927 to eliminate the numerical duplication between NY 4 and the new US 4 in eastern New York. Both NY 2 and NY 17 remained unchanged until 1938, when US 15 was extended northward from Harrisburg, Pennsylvania, to Rochester along the routing of NY 2. NY 17 and US 15 were rerouted slightly in the late 1950s to follow Coopers–Bath Road through Painted Post instead.

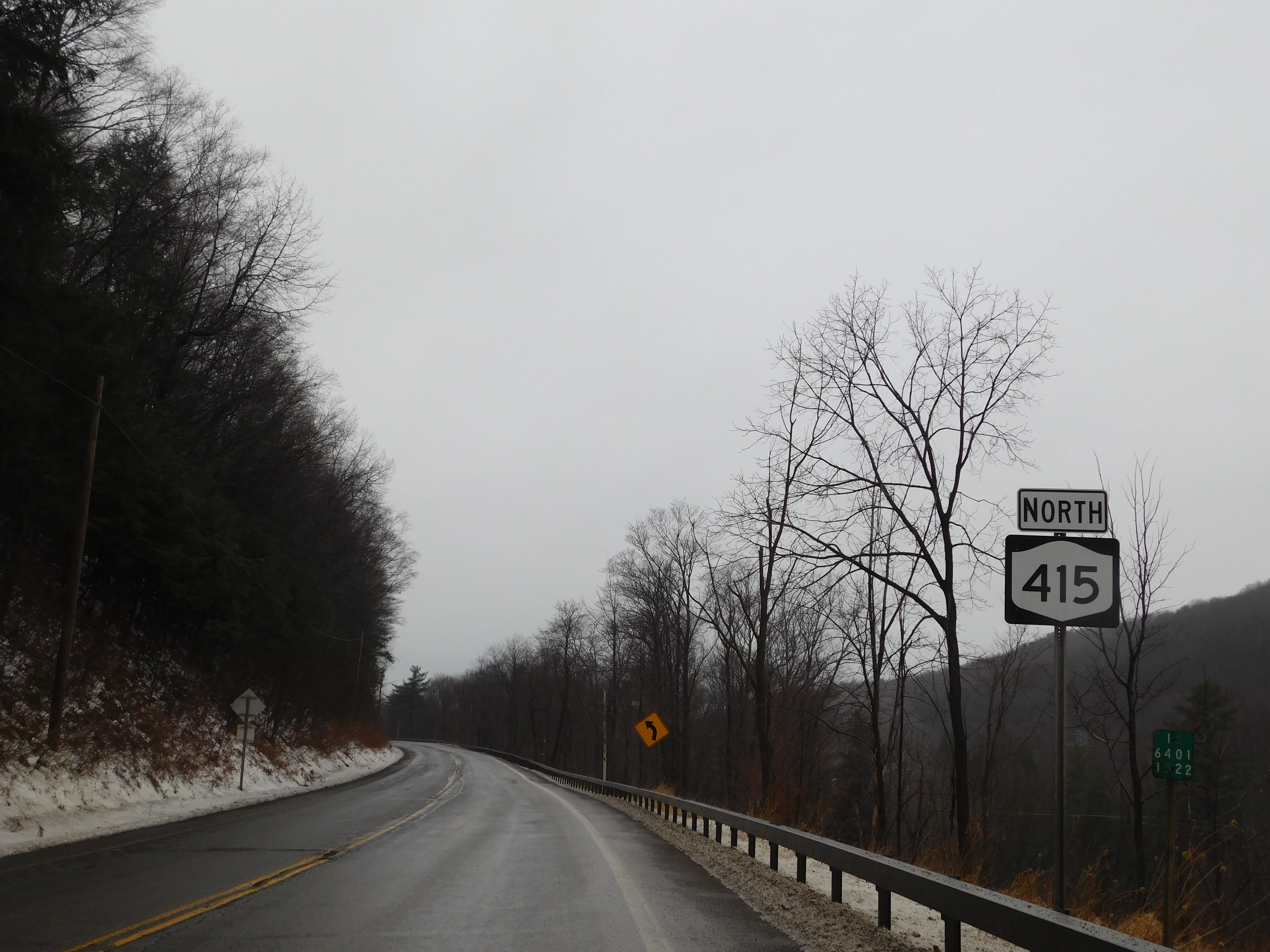
NY 415 northbound in Wayland with a former NY 15 reference marker

Construction began c. 1962 on a bypass of NY 17 and US 15 in the vicinity of Corning (modern exit 45) and Painted Post (exit 43). The entirety of the highway, plus an extension northwest to Campbell (exit 41), was completed between 1964 and 1968. US 15 and NY 17 were rerouted to follow the new highway, and their former routings between Campbell and Corning were redesignated as NY 415. The route also continued eastward into downtown Corning, where it ended at the junction of Pulteney Street and Baker Street (NY 414). The portion of the US 15 / NY 17 freeway between Campbell and Avoca (exit 36) was completed by 1973; however, NY 415 continued to terminate in Campbell until July 1, 1974, when it was extended north to a junction with NY 21 south of Wayland following the completion of I-390 between Avoca and Wayland. When the Corning Bypass (part of the Southern Tier Expressway) was built in 1995, NY 414 was rerouted to follow Centerway through the city. NY 415 was then extended east for two blocks to meet the new routing of NY 414.

Ownership and maintenance of NY 415 from Meads Creek Road in Coopers Plains to Babcock Hollow Road outside of Bath was transferred from the state of New York to Steuben County by 1977. The highway was co-designated as CR 415 at the time. On April 1, 1997, ownership and maintenance of this portion of NY 415 was given back to the state of New York as part of a larger highway maintenance swap between the two levels of government.

== Major intersections ==
The entire route is in Steuben County.

| Location | mi | km | Destinations | Notes |
|---|---|---|---|---|
| City of Corning | 0.00 | 0.00 | NY 414 (Center Way) to I-86 / NY 17 / Southern Tier Expressway | Southern terminus |
| Riverside, Steuben County | 1.33 | 2.14 | I-86 west / NY 17 west / Southern Tier Expressway west / NY 352 east | Western terminus of NY 352 |
| Riverside, Steuben County | 1.40 | 2.25 | I-86 east / NY 17 east / Southern Tier Expressway east | Exit 45 (I-86 / NY 17) |
| Painted Post | 2.06 | 3.32 | NY 417 west (North Hamilton Street) to I-86 / NY 17 / Southern Tier Expressway | Eastern terminus of NY 417 |
| Erwin | 3.14 | 5.05 | I-86 / NY 17 / Southern Tier Expressway – Jamestown, Corning | Exit 43 (I-86 / NY 17) |
| Erwin | 5.20 | 8.37 | Meads Creek Road (NY 960M north) to I-86 / NY 17 / Southern Tier Expressway / CR 26 north | Hamlet of Coopers Plains |
| Campbell | 8.98 | 14.45 | CR 333 west (Main Street) to I-86 / NY 17 / Southern Tier Expressway | Former eastern terminus of NY 333; hamlet of Campbell |
| Savona | 13.98 | 22.50 | NY 226 (Lamoka Avenue) to I-86 / NY 17 / Southern Tier Expressway | |
| Town of Bath | 18.40 | 29.61 | Babcock Hollow Road (NY 960U south) to I-86 / NY 17 / Southern Tier Expressway | Northern terminus of NY 960U |
| Village of Bath | 20.45 | 32.91 | NY 54 north (Liberty Street) – Hammondsport, Penn Yan | Southern terminus of NY 54 overlap |
| Village of Bath | 21.20 | 34.12 | I-86 / NY 17 / Southern Tier Expressway – Binghamton, Jamestown NY 54 ends | Northern terminus of NY 54 overlap; exit 38 (I-86 / NY 17) |
| Town of Bath | 24.02 | 38.66 | NY 53 north (Main Street) to I-86 / NY 17 / Southern Tier Expressway – Kanona, Prattsburgh | Southern terminus of NY 53 |
| Town of Avoca | 27.26 | 43.87 | Michigan Hollow Road (NY 961J east) to I-390 | Western terminus of unsigned NY 961J |
| Village of Cohocton | 36.03 | 57.98 | NY 371 north (North Main Street) – Naples | Southern terminus of NY 371 |
| Village of Cohocton | 36.68 | 59.03 | Cohocton Loon Lake Road (NY 962D west) to I-390 / NY 15 / CR 121 – Corning, Rochester | Eastern terminus of unsigned NY 962D; formerly part of NY 371 |
| Town of Wayland | 42.83 | 68.93 | NY 15 / NY 21 to I-390 / Michigan Road – Perkinsville, Hornell, Wayland | Northern terminus |
1.000 mi = 1.609 km; 1.000 km = 0.621 mi: Concurrency terminus

== See also ==
- List of county routes in Steuben County, New York
