= New York State Route 371 =

State highway in Steuben County, New York, US

New York State Route 371
- Map of Steuben County in the Southern Tier of New York with NY 371 highlighted in red and NY 962D in blue

Route information
- Maintained by NYSDOT
- Length: 4.83 mi (7.77 km)
- Existed: 1930–present

Major junctions
- South end: NY 415 in Cohocton village
- North end: NY 21 in Cohocton town

Location
- Country: United States
- State: New York
- Counties: Steuben

Highway system
- New York Highways; Interstate; US; State; Reference; Parkways
← NY 370	→ NY 372

New York State Route 371 (NY 371) is a north–south state highway in Steuben County, New York, in the United States. It runs for 4.83 miles (7.77 km) from an intersection with NY 415 in the village of Cohocton to a junction with NY 21 in the town of Cohocton. NY 371 follows the Cohocton River and the main line of the B&H Rail Corporation for virtually its entire length. Most of the route passes through rural areas located inside of a valley surrounding the river.

In the 1930 renumbering of state highways in New York, what is now NY 371 was designated as part of NY 21 while NY 371 was assigned to modern NY 21 between Wayland and Loon Lake. NY 21 was realigned c. 1937 to bypass Cohocton via Wayland while NY 371 was reassigned to NY 21's former routing from Loon Lake to North Cohocton. The route was cut back to its current southern terminus in 1949.

== Route description ==
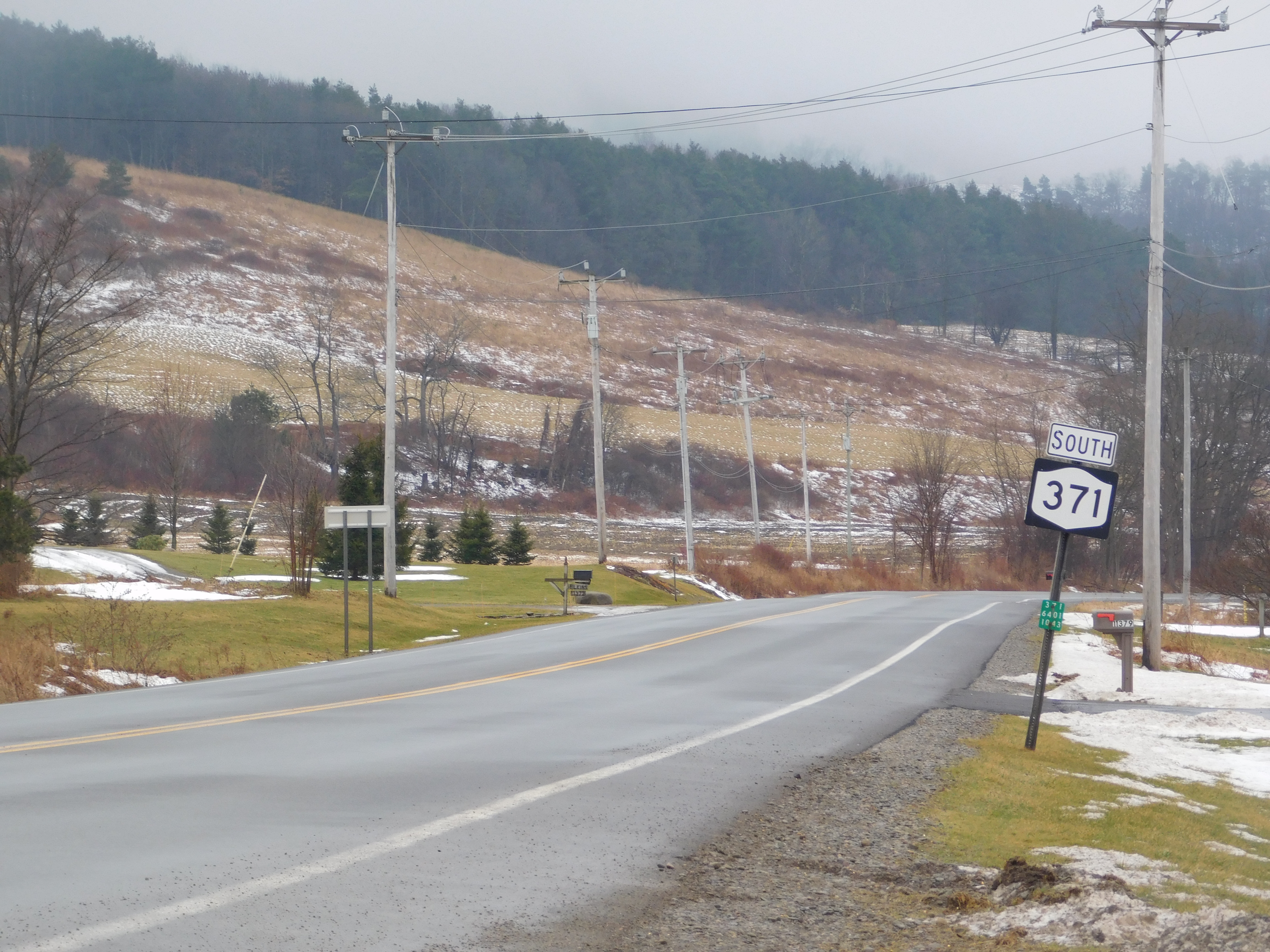
NY 371 southbound from NY 21 in North Cohocton

NY 371 begins at an intersection with NY 415 in the center of the village of Cohocton, located in a valley surrounding the Cohocton River. At this junction, southbound traffic continuing straight will proceed onto NY 415 south while NY 415 north is accessed by way of a right-hand turn. The route heads northeastward from NY 415 as a two-lane highway, leaving Cohocton's central business district for a more residential area of the small village. After just one block, the homes give way to open, undeveloped areas as NY 371 crosses over the Cohocton River and exits the village limits.

Outside of the village, NY 371 heads in a generally northeasterly direction through the town of Cohocton, following the Cohocton River valley through sparsely populated areas of the town. Over the next 3.5 miles (5.6 km), the route closely parallels the river and the main line of the B&H Rail Corporation as it serves a series of farms and a small hamlet known as Kirkwood. At Atlanta, a hamlet about 0.5 miles (0.8 km) west of NY 371, the river valley turns west toward Wayland. While the B&H line curves westward to follow the valley, NY 371 continues north to the smaller community of North Cohocton, where it passes a block of homes before ending at a junction with NY 21. Like NY 415 in Cohocton, NY 21 is straight (compass north) ahead while NY 21 south is reached by turning left (compass west).

== History ==
The roadway linking the village of Cohocton to the hamlet of North Cohocton was originally designated as part of Route 14, an unsigned legislative route, by the New York State Legislature in 1908. When the first set of posted routes in New York were assigned in 1924, the Cohocton–North Cohocton route was not given a designation; however, it did become part of NY 52 by 1926. When it was first assigned, NY 52 passed through Cohocton on its way from Wayland to North Cohocton. NY 52 was rerouted later in the decade to bypass Cohocton to the north on what is now NY 21.

The road from Cohocton to North Cohocton became part of a signed route once more—this time, NY 21—as part of the 1930 renumbering of state highways in New York. NY 21 entered Loon Lake, a hamlet southwest of Cohocton, from the south as it does today; however, it initially exited it to the east via Loon Lake Road. It followed the length of Loon Lake Road east to Cohocton, from where it traveled north along the 1926-era routing of NY 52 to North Cohocton. NY 21 turned northeast here, following its modern alignment toward Ontario County. At the same time, the piece of modern NY 21 between Loon Lake and NY 2 (modern NY 415) south of Wayland was designated NY 371.

The alignments of NY 21 and NY 371 between Loon Lake and North Cohocton were flipped c. 1937, placing NY 371 on Loon Lake Road and its modern alignment between Cohocton and North Cohocton. NY 371 was truncated on its southern end to Cohocton on January 1, 1949. The former routing of NY 371 along Loon Lake Road from NY 21 to Interstate 390 exit 2 is now maintained by Steuben County as County Route 121 while the segment from I-390 to NY 415 is NY 962D, an unsigned reference route.

== Major intersections ==
The entire route is in Steuben County.

Location	mi	km	Destinations	Notes
Village of Cohocton	0.00	0.00	NY 415 to I-390 – Avoca, Wayland	Southern terminus
Town of Cohocton	4.83	7.77	NY 21 – Naples, Wayland	Northern terminus; hamlet of North Cohocton
1.000 mi = 1.609 km; 1.000 km = 0.621 mi

== See also ==
- List of county routes in Steuben County, New York
