= Wayland, New York (disambiguation) =

Wayland may refer to two municipalities in Steuben County, New York in the United States:

- Wayland (town), New York
- Wayland (village), New York, located entirely within the town
