= Bath Central School District =

School district in New York, United States

Bath Central School District is a school district headquartered in Bath, New York.

The Village of Bath is in the district. Towns that have portions in this district include Bath, Avoca, Cameron, Thurston, Urbana, and Wheeler.

== History ==
Joseph Rumsey began being the superintendent circa 2013. He will retire effective June 30, 2023. Kelly Houck is scheduled to become the superintendent on that date.

On December 19, 2025, the school district placed a lockout at Haverling High School after receiving a threatening call. The Bath Police Department traced the call back to Ontario County. Carrie McChesney was arrested and is charged with making a terroristic threat.

== Schools ==
- Haverling High School
- Dana Lyon Middle School
- Vernon E. Wightman Primary School
