= New York State Route 15 =

State highway in western New York, US

New York State Route 15
- Map of western New York with NY 15 highlighted in red

Route information
- Maintained by NYSDOT and the city of Rochester
- Length: 47.27 mi (76.07 km)
- Existed: 1974–present

Major junctions
- South end: I-390 / NY 21 near Wayland village
- US 20A in Livonia; US 20 / NY 5 near Avon village; NY 253 in Henrietta; I-390 in Brighton I-490 in Rochester
- North end: NY 31 in Rochester

Location
- Country: United States
- State: New York
- Counties: Steuben, Livingston, Monroe

Highway system
- New York Highways; Interstate; US; State; Reference; Parkways
← US 15	→ NY 15A

New York State Route 15 (NY 15) is a north–south state highway located in western New York in the United States. The southern terminus of the route is officially at Interstate 390 (I-390) exit 3 south of the village of Wayland, although some signage indicating that NY 15 continues south to the northern terminus of U.S. Route 15 (US 15) in Painted Post still exists. The northern terminus of NY 15 is at an intersection with NY 31 in downtown Rochester. Outside of Monroe County, NY 15 is a rural two-lane highway. In the Rochester suburbs of Henrietta and Brighton, however, NY 15 is a major commercial strip, and the section in Rochester is a two-to-four lane street that serves commercial and residential areas.

From Lakeville north to the Rochester city limits, NY 15 is little more than an alternate route to I-390, which closely follows the route through northern Livingston County and southern Monroe County. South of Lakeville, the route is a regionally important highway that serves the villages of Livonia and Wayland and the hamlets of Conesus and Springwater. It crosses US 20 and NY 5 near Avon and overlaps with US 20A between Livonia and Lakeville. NY 15A, an easterly alternate route of NY 15, parallels its parent from Springwater north to Rochester.

All of NY 15 was originally part of US 15. In 1974, US 15 was truncated to Painted Post and its continuation to Rochester was designated NY 15. For some time afterward, NY 15 was signed as a direct continuation of US 15; that is, it began in Painted Post and had overlaps with NY 17 and I-390 to Wayland. Officially, however, the route began overlapped with NY 21 south of Wayland, and in 2009 the New York State Department of Transportation (NYSDOT) made plans to remove all signage for NY 15 on I-86 and I-390.

== Route description ==
Most of NY 15 is maintained by NYSDOT; however, the section of the route that lies within the city of Rochester is locally maintained.

=== Steuben and Livingston counties ===
NY 15 begins at I-390 exit 3 in the town of Wayland in northwestern Steuben County. It heads north along an overlap with NY 21, connecting to NY 415 and passing the northwest end of the B&H Rail Corporation's main line on its way into the village of Wayland, where it becomes South Lackawanna Street. In the village center, NY 21 separates from NY 15, turning east at Naples Street at an intersection that also serves as the southern terminus of NY 63. The route continues north alone, becoming North Lackawanna Street for its last few blocks in the village before leaving it for Livingston County. Across the county line in the town of Springwater, NY 15 proceeds through more open areas as it heads generally northward into a valley containing the hamlet of Springwater, also officially known as Springwater Hamlet, built up around NY 15's junction with NY 15A.

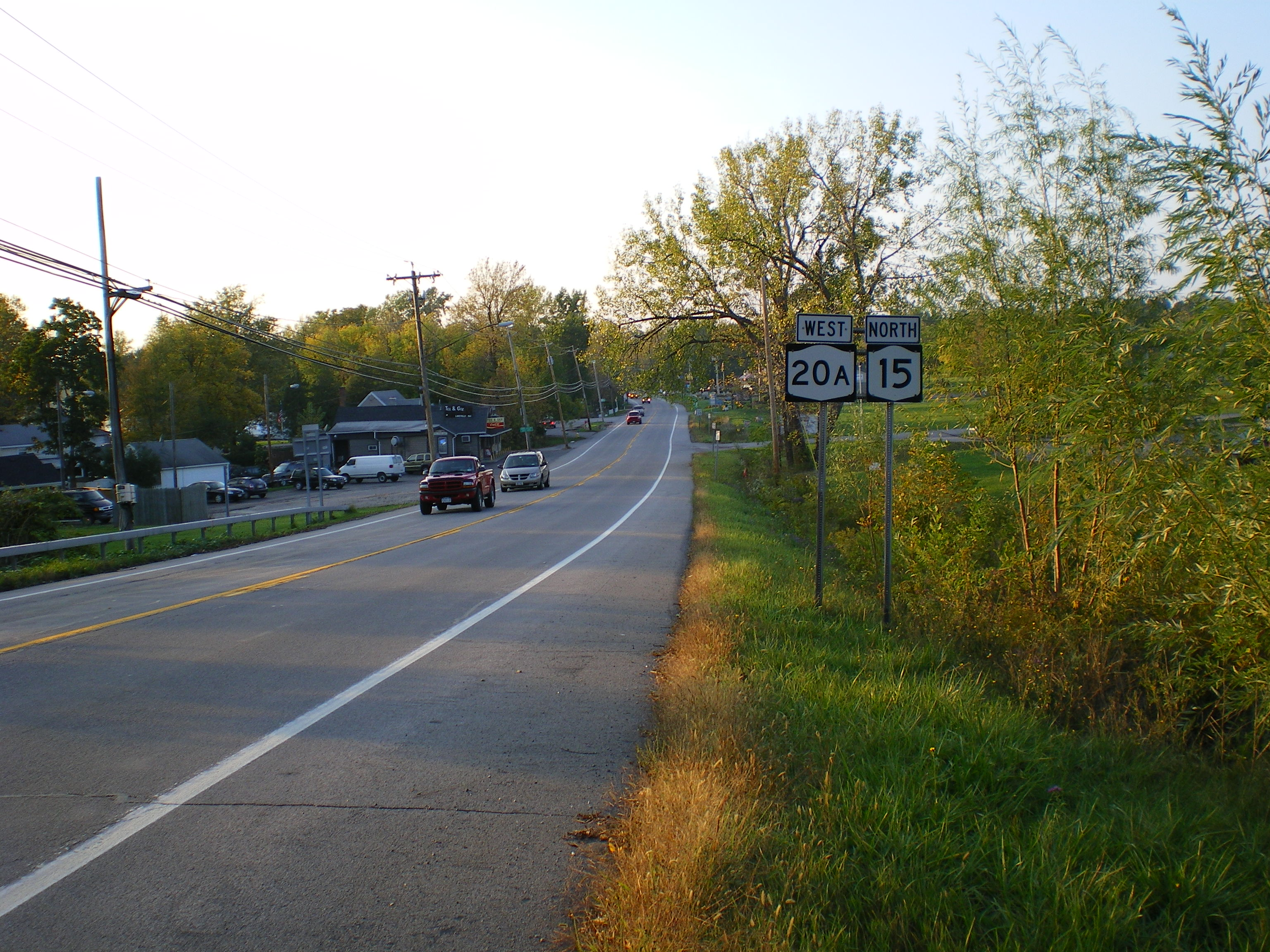
US 20A (here erroneously signed as NY 20A) and NY 15 just east of Lakeville

While NY 15A heads due north from Springwater toward Hemlock Lake, NY 15 leaves Springwater to the west, climbing out of the valley and snaking its way northwestward through the hills of the Southern Tier to the town of Conesus. At the hamlet of Conesus, NY 15 connects to County Route 71 (CR 71), formerly designated as NY 255. Past Conesus, the route continues northward across rolling, rural terrain to the village of Livonia, located in the town of the same name. NY 15 veers northeastward as Commercial Street for three blocks to Main Street, which carries the east–west US 20A through the village. Here, NY 15 turns west onto Main Street, joining US 20A on a 2.5-mile (4.0 km) overlap along Main Street and Big Tree Road that takes both routes into the adjacent hamlet of Lakeville, located at the northern tip of Conesus Lake. The two routes split in the center of the community, where US 20A continues west towards Buffalo while NY 15 turns north towards Rochester.

The route heads away from Lakeville on a northwesterly alignment, paralleling Conesus Creek and to a lesser extent the Livonia, Avon and Lakeville Railroad (LAL) to a junction with NY 256 on the Livonia–Geneseo town line. NY 256 merges into NY 15 here, and NY 15 takes on its linear north-northeasterly routing as it heads into the adjacent town of Avon. Just north of the town line, NY 15 passes under the LAL and comes into contact with I-390 once again, this time at exit 9. Past the exit, I-390 turns to the north, following NY 15 as both routes cross 2 miles (3.2 km) of open, sparsely developed areas on their way to the hamlet of East Avon, centered on NY 15's junction with US 20 and NY 5. Outside of East Avon, the two highways continue to follow parallel alignments for another 2 miles (3.2 km) to the Monroe County line.

=== Southern Monroe County ===
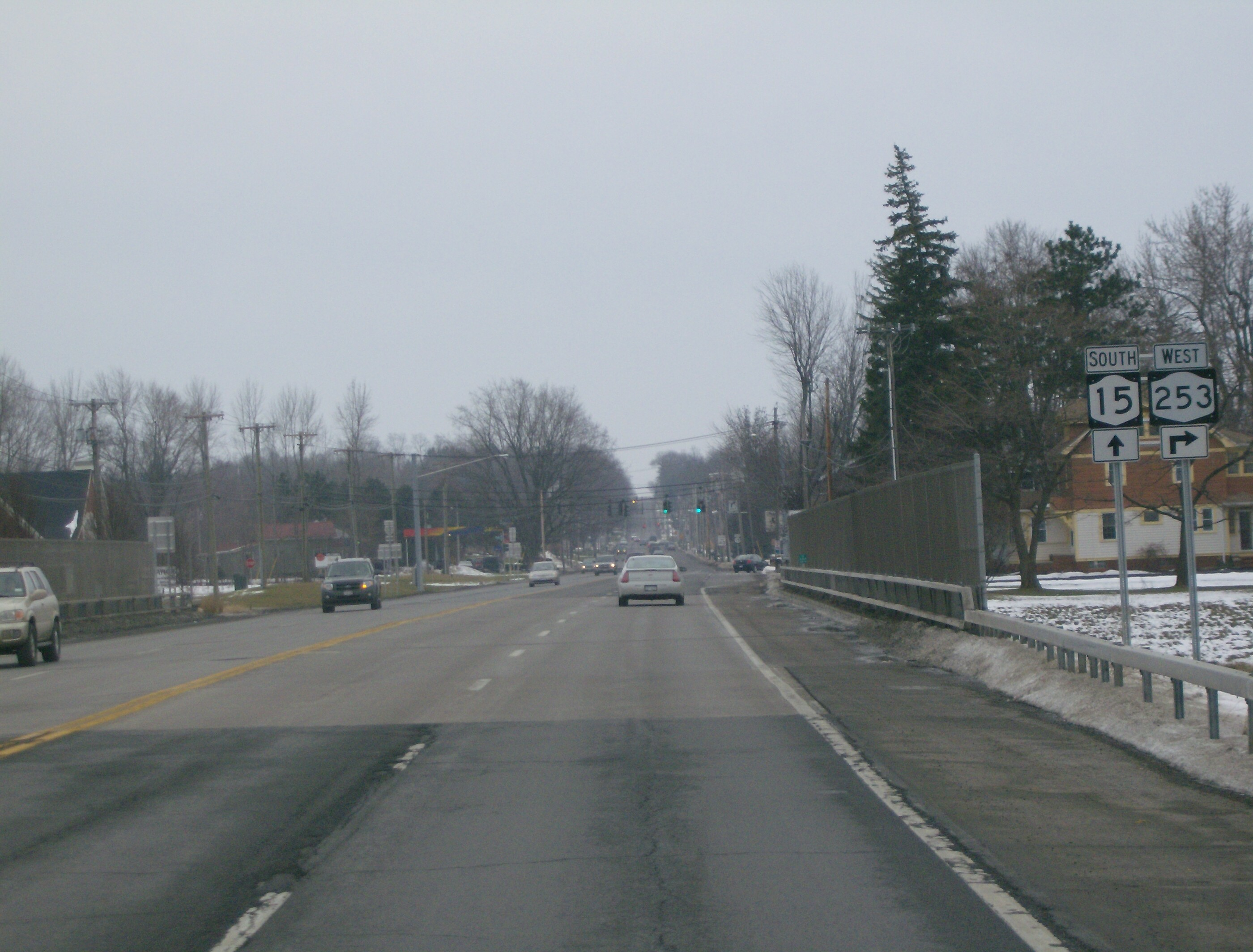
Southbound on the NY 15 / NY 253 overlap in Henrietta. NY 253 leaves NY 15 in the near foreground; off in the distance is West Henrietta.

Now in the town of Rush, NY 15 takes on the name West Henrietta Road, which it keeps until the Rochester city line 12 miles (19 km) to the north. The route remains close to I-390 throughout most of southern Monroe County, crossing over the expressway and Honeoye Creek before connecting to I-390 at exit 11, an exit serving both NY 15 and NY 251, which intersect a short distance east of the interchange. Not far from the exit is the Henrietta town line, at which point the route begins to pass through gradually more developed areas as it enters the outer suburbs of Rochester. In West Henrietta, the last hamlet of consequence along the highway, NY 15 crosses Erie Station Road, formerly part of NY 253. Just north of the community is a junction with Thruway Park Drive, the current routing of NY 253 through the area.

Here, NY 15 takes part in its third and final concurrency as NY 253 joins NY 15 for one mile (1.6 km) across the New York State Thruway (I-90) to Lehigh Station Road, which NY 253 follows eastward toward Pittsford. NY 15, meanwhile, continues on a northeasterly line toward Rochester, passing by the studios of local television stations, WHAM and WUHF, prior to entering a major commercial district surrounding The Marketplace Mall and Jefferson Road (NY 252). Within the district, NY 15 crosses a spur of the LAL and intersects NY 252 at a grade-separated interchange just south of the Henrietta–Brighton town line. The route exits Henrietta for Brighton, but the commercial surroundings remain until Crittenden Road, a local east–west arterial linking NY 15 to both NY 15A and the Monroe Community College campus on the latter route.

=== Rochester ===
North of Crittenden Road, NY 15 passes through a pocket of residential development that borders I-390 and the adjacent Erie Canal. At the northern edge of the area, NY 15 meets and crosses I-390 for the final time at exit 16. While I-390 continues northwest from here, bypassing most of Rochester, NY 15 stays true to its linear northeasterly alignment, crossing the Erie Canal and entering the city's southernmost section. In this area, NY 15, now Mount Hope Avenue, serves the Monroe County offices and meets NY 15A at East Henrietta Road, completing the eastern alternate loop of NY 15. One long block to the north is Elmwood Avenue (formerly NY 47), which crosses NY 15 at the southeastern corner of Mount Hope Cemetery.

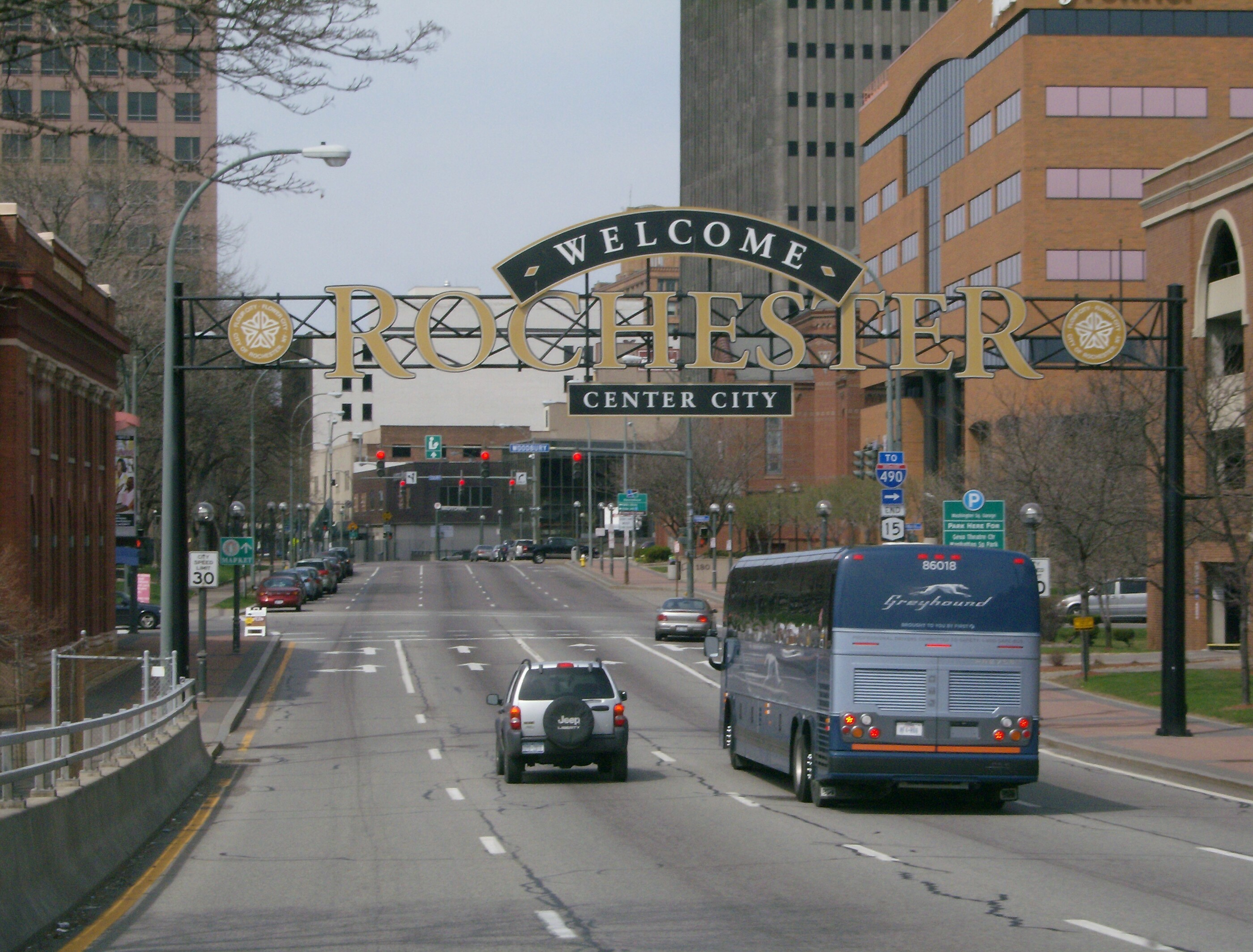
Approaching the northern terminus of NY 15 at NY 31 in downtown Rochester

The route continues on, running along the east side of the cemetery and the west side of Highland Park as it crosses into a predominately residential section of Rochester known as the South Wedge. NY 15 finally breaks from the linear alignment it had followed since southern Henrietta and gradually gets closer to the nearby Genesee River as it heads northward through the neighborhood; however, it makes a sharp turn to the east just south of downtown Rochester to meet South Avenue in the shadow of I-490 and the Inner Loop. Mount Hope Avenue ends here while NY 15 continues east onto Byron Street, a one-block connector between South and South Clinton Avenues. At its east end, NY 15 turns north onto a unidirectional section of Clinton Avenue, passing over I-490 and the Inner Loop before reaching its northern terminus at the intersection of South Clinton Avenue and Woodbury Boulevard (NY 31) in downtown Rochester.

Most of southeastern downtown Rochester's major streets are one-way, resulting in split routings for both NY 15 and NY 31 as they pass through downtown. Westbound NY 31 continues north from the north end of NY 15 on South Clinton Avenue to East Broad Street, onto which it turns west. Southbound NY 15, meanwhile, begins one block to the west at the intersection of South Avenue and Woodbury Boulevard (where eastbound NY 31 makes a left turn). NY 15 follows South Avenue, as well as a number of ramps traversing the Inner Loop and I-490, to the intersection of Mount Hope Avenue and Byron Street, where it joins northbound NY 15 on Mount Hope Avenue.

== History ==
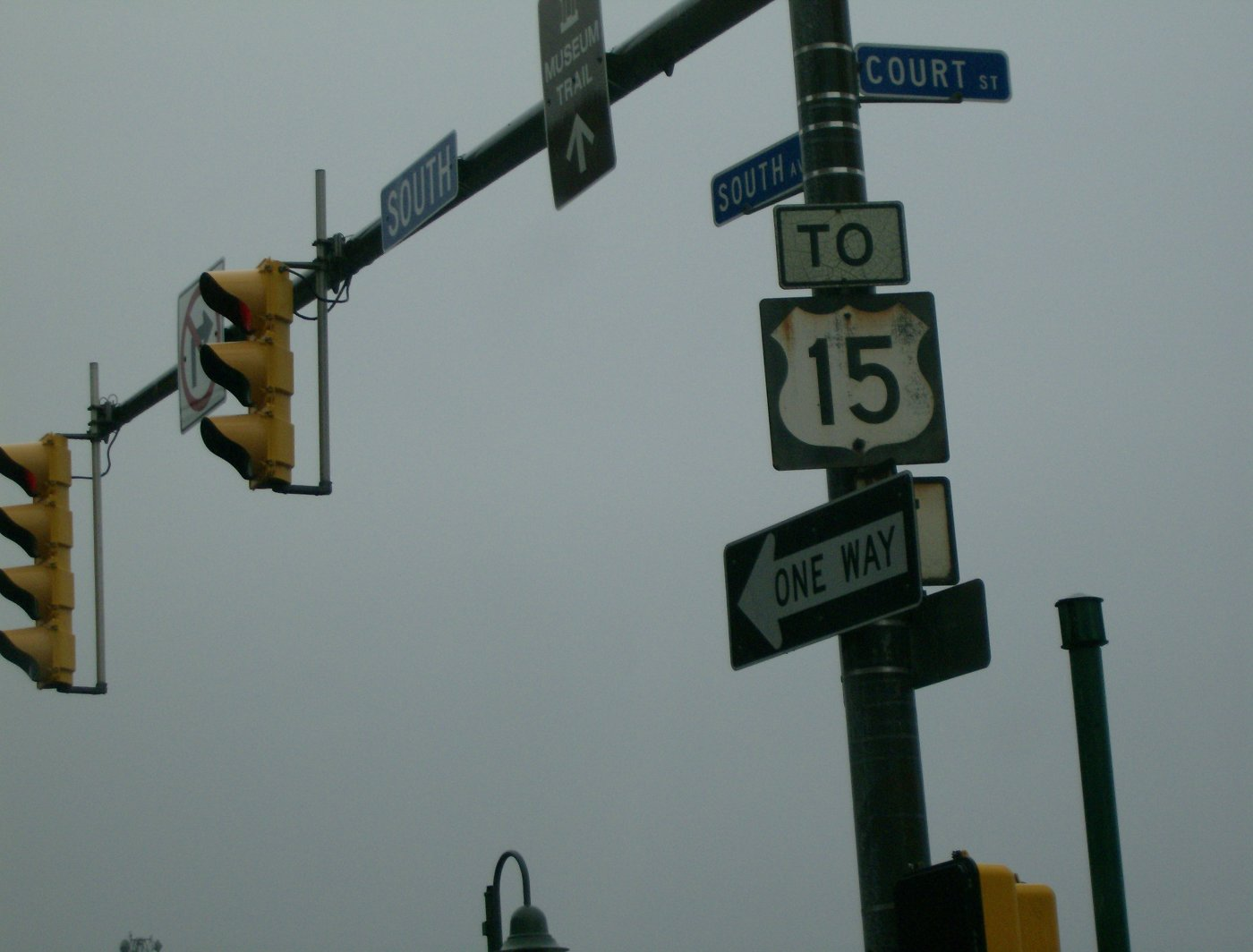
"To US 15" assembly on South Avenue in Rochester

The highway connecting Lawrenceville, Pennsylvania, to Rochester by way of Springwater and Avon was originally designated as NY 4 when the first set of posted routes in New York were assigned in 1924. NY 4 was renumbered to NY 2 in 1927 to avoid numerical duplication with the new US 4 in the Glens Falls area. At the Pennsylvania state line, NY 2 connected to US 111. US 111 was replaced by an extended US 15 c. 1938. US 15 was extended northward to Rochester by the following year, supplanting NY 2.

Construction began in the 1960s on the portion of the Southern Tier Expressway in Steuben County. The section from Painted Post to Campbell opened in the mid-1960s as a realignment of US 15. The former surface routing of US 15 was redesignated as NY 415. An extension of the expressway to Savona was completed by 1971, and the entirety of the highway through Steuben County was completed c. 1973. US 15 left the expressway at exit 38 in Bath to rejoin its original alignment.

In 1974, US 15 was truncated southward to Painted Post and the portion of its former routing north of Painted Post was redesignated as NY 15. Around the same time, NY 17 was realigned between Olean and Corning to use the Southern Tier Expressway instead of modern NY 417. The portion of the Genesee Expressway (I-390) from Avoca to Wayland opened to traffic in the mid-1970s. Although signage for NY 15 existed on NY 17 and I-390, no such overlap existed in reality as the southern terminus of NY 15 was defined as I-390 in Wayland by the New York State Department of Transportation (NYSDOT) as early as 1977. In 2009, NYSDOT elected to remove the NY 15 signage along the Southern Tier Expressway and I-390, effectively moving the signed terminus to I-390 in Wayland as well.

== NY 15A ==

NY 15A (35.19 miles or 56.63 kilometres) is an alternate route of NY 15 between Springwater and Rochester via Lima. It was originally designated as NY 2A in the 1930 renumbering of state highways in New York before becoming NY 15A in 1939.

== Major intersections ==
County	Location	mi	km	Destinations	Notes
Steuben	Town of Wayland	0.00	0.00	NY 21 south – Hornell	Southern terminus; southern terminus of NY 21 overlap
Steuben	Town of Wayland	0.00	0.00	I-390 – Corning, Rochester	Exit 3 (I-390)
Steuben	Town of Wayland	0.16	0.26	NY 415 south	Northern terminus of NY 415
Steuben	Village of Wayland	1.86	2.99	NY 21 north / NY 63 north – North Cohocton, Dansville	Northern terminus of NY 21 overlap; southern terminus of NY 63
Livingston	Springwater	6.86	11.04	NY 15A north – Rochester	Southern terminus of NY 15A; hamlet of Springwater
Livingston	Conesus	14.38	23.14	CR 71 – Dansville	Former northern terminus of NY 255
Livingston	Village of Livonia	21.95	35.33	US 20A east	Eastern terminus of US 20A overlap
Livingston	Town of Livonia	24.14	38.85	US 20A west – Conesus Lake	Western terminus of US 20A overlap; hamlet of Lakeville
Livingston	Town of Livonia	25.49	41.02	NY 256 south – Dansville	Northern terminus of NY 256
Livingston	Town of Avon	26.46	42.58	I-390 – Rochester, Corning	Exit 9 (I-390)
Livingston	Town of Avon	29.33	47.20	US 20 / NY 5 to I-390	Hamlet of East Avon
Monroe	Rush	36.20	58.26	NY 251 – Rush, Industry	
Monroe	Rush	36.43	58.63	I-390 to I-90 – Avon, Rochester	Exit 11 (I-390)
Monroe	Henrietta	38.87	62.56	Erie Station Road ( NY 943E west)	Eastern terminus of unsigned NY 943E; former routing of NY 253; hamlet of West Henrietta
Monroe	Henrietta	39.27	63.20	NY 253 west (Thruway Park Drive)	Southern terminus of NY 253 overlap
Monroe	Henrietta	40.22	64.73	NY 253 east (Lehigh Station Road) to I-90 / New York Thruway / I-390	Northern terminus of NY 253 overlap
Monroe	Henrietta	42.35	68.16	NY 252 (Jefferson Road)	Modified diamond interchange
Monroe	Brighton	44.07	70.92	I-390 to I-590	Exit 16 (I-390)
Monroe	Rochester	44.79	72.08	NY 15A south (East Henrietta Road)	Northern terminus of NY 15A
Monroe	Rochester	46.99	75.62	I-490 east	Exit 15 (I-490)
Monroe	Rochester	47.27	76.07	NY 31 (Clinton Avenue / Woodbury Boulevard)	Northern terminus
1.000 mi = 1.609 km; 1.000 km = 0.621 mi: Concurrency terminus; Incomplete access
