= Frank Gee Patchin =

American author

Frank Gee Patchin (1861–1925) was an American author of children's books. He was born in Wayland, New York. He is known for his series Battleship Boys and Pony Rider Boys. Patchin published more than 200 adventure books, many using various pseudonyms including Victor Durham and Jessie Graham Flower. He also wrote for the Edward Stratemeyer Syndicate.
