= Wood Road Metal Truss Bridge =

- U.S. National Register of Historic Places
- Location within New York Location within the United States
- Nearest city: Campbell, New York
- Coordinates: 42°15′9″N 77°13′2″W
- Area: less than one acre
- Built: 1897
- NRHP reference No.: 05000169
- Added to NRHP: March 15, 2005

Wood Road Metal Truss Bridge is a historic Baltimore (petit) truss bridge located at Campbell in Steuben County, New York. It was constructed in 1897 by the Phoenix Iron Works of Phoenixville, Pennsylvania and spans the Cohocton River. The bridge was rehabilitated in 2003.

It was listed on the National Register of Historic Places in 2005.
