= District School Number Five =

- U.S. National Register of Historic Places
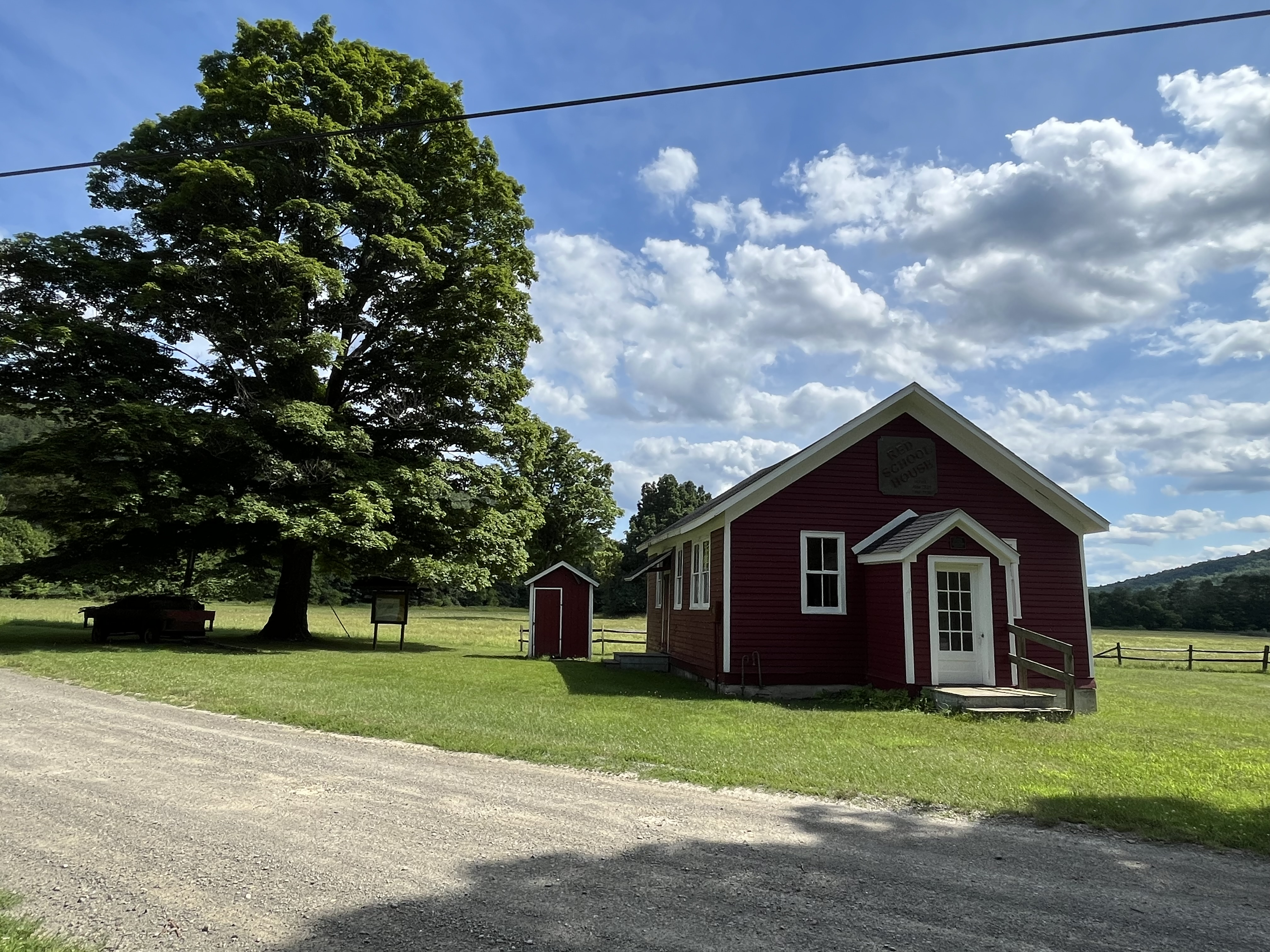

- Location within New York Location within the United States
- Location: 9436 Dry Run Rd., Campbell, New York
- Coordinates: 42°13′24″N 77°7′58″W
- Area: less than one acre
- Built: 1839
- NRHP reference No.: 01000242
- Added to NRHP: March 21, 2001

District School Number Five, also known as "The Little Red Schoolhouse," is a historic one room school building located at Campbell in Steuben County, New York. It was built during the spring and summer of 1839 with a hand hewn timber frame of mortise and tenon construction. The schoolhouse is part of the Watson Homestead Conference and Retreat Center, deeded to the Genesee Conference of the Methodist Church by IBM founder Thomas J. Watson, Sr. Watson attended the school as a child. Also on the property is a small frame structure that served as privy and woodshed.

It was listed on the National Register of Historic Places in 2001.
