= Coopers Plains, New York =

- Census-designated place
- Location within New York Location within the United States
- Coordinates: 42°10′56″N 77°8′29″W
- Country: United States
- State: New York
- County: Steuben
- Towns: Erwin; Campbell

Area
  - Total: 0.82 sq mi (2.13 km^{2})
  - Land: 0.82 sq mi (2.13 km^{2})
  - Water: 0 sq mi (0.00 km^{2})
- Elevation: 992 ft (302 m)

Population (2020)
  - Total: 609
  - Density: 738.9/sq mi (285.29/km^{2})
- Time zone: UTC-5 (Eastern (EST))
  - Summer (DST): UTC-4 (EDT)
- ZIP Code: 14827 (Coopers Plains); 14870 (Painted Post)
- Area code: 607
- FIPS code: 36-18036
- GNIS feature ID: 2631228

Coopers Plains is a hamlet and census-designated place (CDP) in the towns of Erwin and Campbell in Steuben County, New York, United States. As of the 2020 census, Coopers Plains had a population of 609.

The community is in eastern Steuben County, in the northern part of Erwin and extending north into the southern part of Campbell. It is bordered to the south by Gang Mills. Coopers Plains occupies valley bottomland between the Cohocton River to the south and Meads Creek to the northeast, extending southeast to their confluence. The Cohocton is a southeast-flowing tributary of the Chemung River and part of the Susquehanna River watershed.

New York State Route 415 (Victory Highway) passes through the north side of the community, and Interstate 86 forms the northern edge of the CDP, with access from Exit 42 (County Road 26). It is 3 miles (5 km) southeast to Painted Post and 5 miles (8 km) to Corning, while to the northwest it is 15 miles (24 km) to Bath.

== Demographics ==
Historical population
Census	Pop.	Note	%±
2020	609		—
U.S. Decennial Census

== Education ==
It is in the Corning City School District.
