= Campbell (CDP), New York =

Campbell, New York
- Census-designated place
- Location within New York Location within the United States
- Coordinates: 42°13′58″N 77°11′48″W
- Country: United States
- State: New York
- County: Steuben
- Town: Campbell

Area
  - Total: 1.76 sq mi (4.56 km^{2})
  - Land: 1.76 sq mi (4.56 km^{2})
  - Water: 0 sq mi (0.00 km^{2})
- Elevation: 1,010 ft (310 m)

Population (2020)
  - Total: 659
  - Density: 374.1/sq mi (144.45/km^{2})
- Time zone: UTC-5 (Eastern (EST))
  - Summer (DST): UTC-4 (EDT)
- ZIP Code: 14821
- Area code: 607
- FIPS code: 36-11935
- GNIS feature ID: 2631225

Campbell is the primary hamlet and a census-designated place (CDP) in the town of Campbell in Steuben County, New York, United States. As of the 2010 census, it had a population of 713, out of 3,406 in the entire town of Campbell.

The community is in eastern Steuben County, in the western part of the town of Campbell. It is on the northeast side of the Cohocton River, a southeast-flowing tributary of the Chemung River and part of the Susquehanna River watershed. New York State Route 415 runs along the northeast edge of the CDP, and Interstate 86 passes more centrally through the CDP, just east of the hamlet's center. Access from I-86 is from Exit 41 (Main Street). I-86 and NY 415 lead southeast 10 miles (16 km) to Corning and northwest 11 miles (18 km) to Bath.

The hamlet is also referred to as "Campbelltown" in the official New York State Gazetteer, maintained and published by the New York State Department of Health, which includes numerous defunct hamlets and towns, some with alternate or archaic spellings.

== Demographics ==
Historical population
Census	Pop.	Note	%±
2020	659		—
U.S. Decennial Census
