= Campbell, New York =

- Town
- Location within New York Location within the United States
- Coordinates: 42°14′5″N 77°10′7″W
- Country: United States
- State: New York
- County: Steuben

Area
  - Total: 40.78 sq mi (105.62 km^{2})
  - Land: 40.68 sq mi (105.37 km^{2})
  - Water: 0.093 sq mi (0.24 km^{2})
- Elevation: 1,657 ft (505 m)

Population (2020)
  - Total: 3,163 ▼
  - Estimate (2021): 3,121
  - Density: 81.0/sq mi (31.29/km^{2})
- Time zone: UTC-5 (Eastern (EST))
  - Summer (DST): UTC-4 (EDT)
- ZIP code: 14821
- Area code: 607
- FIPS code: 36-11946
- GNIS feature ID: 0978780
- Website: www.campbellny.gov

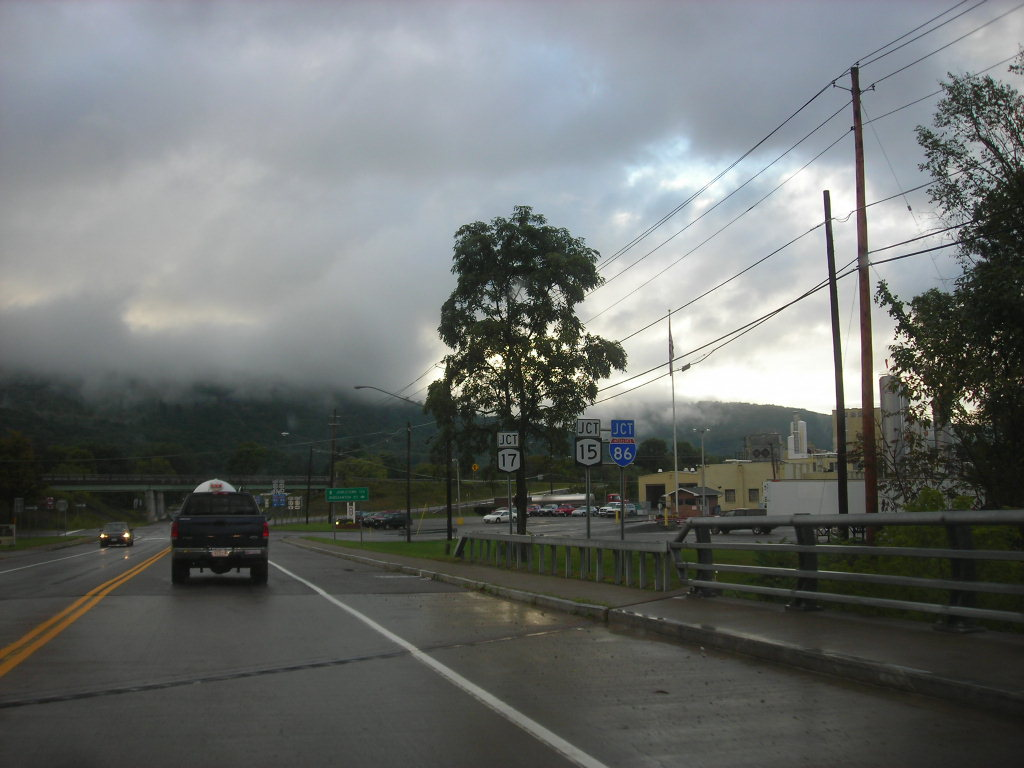
Steuben County Route 333 in Campbell, New York

Campbell is a town in Steuben County, New York, United States. The population was 3,163 at the 2020 census. The name is from Robert Campbell, an early landowner. The town is centrally located in the county and is northwest of Corning.

== History ==
Campbell was first settled around 1801. The town was formed in 1831 from the town of Hornby.

The District School Number Five and Wood Road Metal Truss Bridge are listed on the National Register of Historic Places.

== Notable people ==
Campbell was the birthplace, in 1869, of Illinois Attorney General Edward J. Brundage and, in 1874, of IBM founder Thomas J. Watson Sr.

== Geography ==
According to the United States Census Bureau, the town has a total area of 40.8 square miles (106 km^{2}), of which 40.8 square miles (106 km^{2}) is land and 0.04 square miles (0.10 km^{2}) (0.07%) is water.

Interstate 86 (including New York State Route 17), New York State Route 415 and the Cohocton River pass through the town.

Former New York State Route 333, now County Road 333, enters the town from the west.

Campbell is on the Gang Mills (Painted Post) Line of the B&H Rail Corporation. This portion of track was opened in 1882 as the New York (Hoboken) to Buffalo line of the Delaware, Lackawanna & Western Railroad. In 1963, the route to Buffalo was severed between Wayland and Groveland, N.Y., by order of the U. S. Interstate Commerce Commission in order to promote highway transportation.

Campbell was also served (c. 1853–1963) by the Corning-Rochester line of the Erie Railroad. This line was removed in 1963 by the ICC, also in order to promote highway transportation.

== Demographics ==
Historical population
Census	Pop.	Note	%±
1840	852		—
1850	1,175		37.9%
1860	1,622		38.0%
1870	1,989		22.6%
1880	1,881		−5.4%
1890	1,533		−18.5%
1900	1,467		−4.3%
1910	1,204		−17.9%
1920	1,032		−14.3%
1930	1,263		22.4%
1940	1,472		16.5%
1950	1,814		23.2%
1960	2,471		36.2%
1970	3,180		28.7%
1980	3,801		19.5%
1990	3,658		−3.8%
2000	3,691		0.9%
2010	3,406		−7.7%
2020	3,163		−7.1%
2021 (est.)	3,121	▼	−1.3%
U.S. Decennial Census

As of the census of 2000, there were 3,691 people, 1,418 households, and 1,036 families residing in the town. The population density was 90.6 inhabitants per square mile (35.0/km^{2}). There were 1,515 housing units at an average density of 37.2 per square mile (14.4/km^{2}). The racial makeup of the town was 98.54% White, 0.43% African American, 0.08% Native American, 0.27% Asian, 0.03% Pacific Islander, 0.16% from other races, and 0.49% from two or more races. Hispanic or Latino of any race were 0.35% of the population.

There were 1,418 households, out of which 33.7% had children under the age of 18 living with them, 58.8% were married couples living together, 9.0% had a female householder with no husband present, and 26.9% were non-families. 21.4% of all households were made up of individuals, and 8.0% had someone living alone who was 65 years of age or older. The average household size was 2.59 and the average family size was 2.99.

In the town, the population was spread out, with 26.0% under the age of 18, 7.2% from 18 to 24, 27.7% from 25 to 44, 26.3% from 45 to 64, and 12.8% who were 65 years of age or older. The median age was 38 years. For every 100 females, there were 96.9 males. For every 100 females age 18 and over, there were 95.0 males.

The median income for a household in the town was $39,375, and the median income for a family was $46,220. Males had a median income of $30,820 versus $24,427 for females. The per capita income for the town was $18,819. About 6.1% of families and 8.2% of the population were below the poverty line, including 13.4% of those under age 18 and 4.0% of those age 65 or over.

== Politics ==
Like most of Steuben County, Campbell is a Republican stronghold, with few Democrats on the Town Board.

== Communities and locations in the Town of Campbell ==
- Campbell – The hamlet of Campbell, located on the west side of Interstate 86 by the Cohocton River. County Road 125 is Main Street. It is also at the eastern terminus of County Road 333. (see below)
- Coopers Plains – A hamlet that is mainly in the town of Erwin but extends north into Campbell.
- Curtis – A hamlet south of Campbell village on Interstate 86.
- East Campbell – A hamlet east of Campbell Hamlet, located on County Road 26.
- Meads Creek – A stream passing by East Campbell and the name of a hamlet in the northeast corner of the town, located on the stream.
- Michigan Creek – A stream entering the Cohocton River by Campbell hamlet.

The hamlet of Campbell is also referred to as "Campbelltown" in the official New York State Gazetteer, maintained and published by the New York State Department of Health, which includes numerous defunct hamlets and towns, some with alternate or archaic spellings.
