= B&H Rail Corporation =

Overview
- Headquarters: Cohocton, New York, U.S.
- Reporting mark: BH
- Locale: New York
- Dates of operation: 1872–present

Technical
- Track gauge: 4 ft 8 1/2 in (1,435 mm) standard gauge
- Previous gauge: Originally 3 ft (914 mm) gauge

B&H Rail Corporation (reporting mark BH), formerly the Bath & Hammondsport Railroad, is a Class III shortline railroad. Initially the line served the communities of Bath, New York and Hammondsport, New York. In Bath, the railroad connected with the Erie Railroad and the Delaware, Lackawanna and Western Railroad. In 1996, the railroad was leased by the Livonia, Avon and Lakeville Railroad.

== History ==
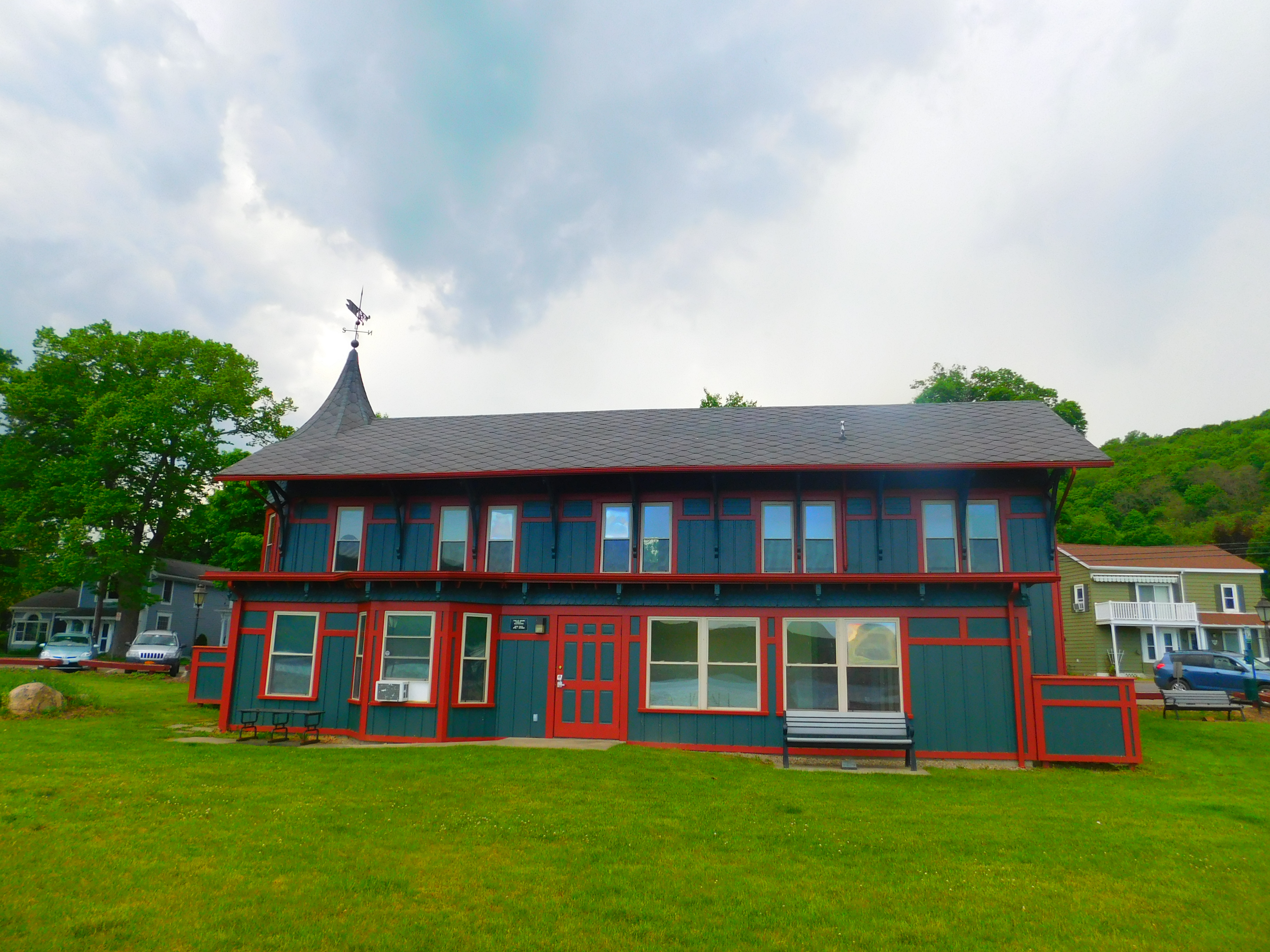
Hammondsport station

It was chartered in 1872 as a 3 ft (914 mm) narrow gauge railroad running from the Erie and Delaware, Lackawanna and Western Railroad's interchange in Bath to Hammondsport, New York. In Hammondsport, passengers could continue north via a ferry on Keuka Lake. The railroad was converted to 4 ft 8 1/2 in (1,435 mm) standard gauge in 1889.

== Erie Railroad control (1903-1935) ==
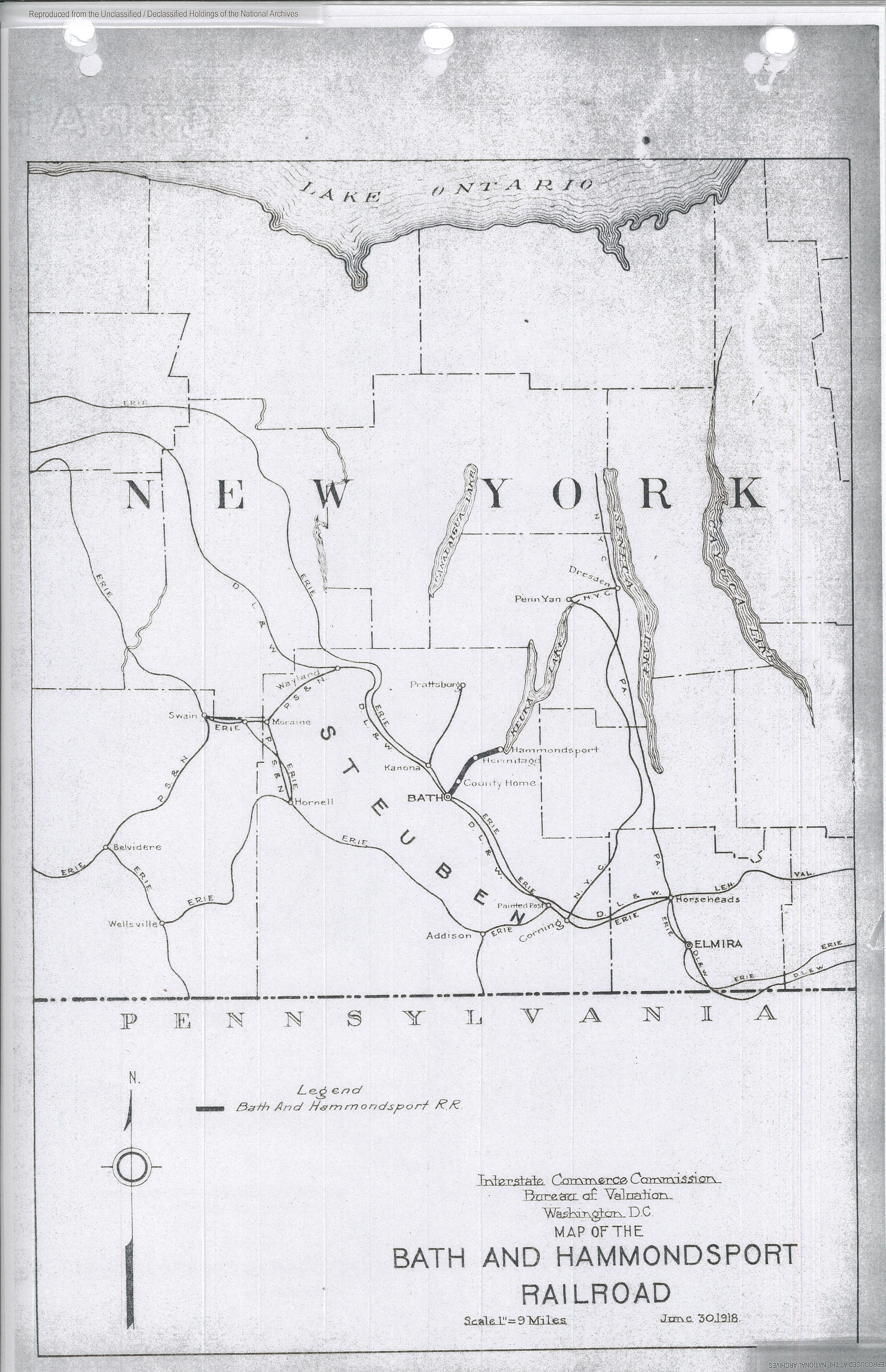
1917 map of the line

The line eventually came under control of the Erie Railroad around 1903. Passenger service ended in 1917, when steamboat service on Keuka Lake was discontinued. Business continued as usual until a flood in 1935 damaged much of the railroad. Faced with having to rebuild miles of railroad, the management of the Erie Railroad instead began abandonment proceedings. Freight service was temporarily provided by trucks. Five local businessmen joined together to purchase the B&H from the Erie and return it to local control. The railroad was repaired and reopened with ceremonies on July 25, 1936.

== Independence and Expansion (1936-1996) ==
1960 saw the merger of the Erie and the Delaware, Lackawanna and Western railroads with the formation of the Erie Lackawanna. On April 1, 1976, the Erie Lackawanna became part of Conrail. That same year, Conrail sold the DL&W line between Bath and Wayland to the Steuben County Industrial Development Agency. B&H became the designated operator of the branch to Wayland. Primary freight traffic for the railroad was wine and related products, lumber, and general commodities. Among the wineries served was the Great Western winery, also known as Pleasant Valley Wine Company. The county operated the line with the nickname of "The Champagne Route", and passenger excursions were operated by the Champagne Railroad (CGNE). These excursions ended in 1994, and much of the track to Hammondsport was taken out of service once wine shipments from Hammondsport ceased. Service continued between Bath and Wayland on the former EL track. Freight interchange was maintained with Conrail at Bath.

== LA&L Acquisition (1996-Present) ==
In May 1996, shortline Livonia, Avon and Lakeville Railroad (LAL) assumed operation of the county-owned trackage, including the original B&H. These operations were transferred to the subsidiary Cohocton Valley Railroad in 2001, and later that year this company was renamed B&H Rail Corporation and assumed a long-term lease of Norfolk Southern Railway trackage between Wayland, Bath and Painted Post. At this time, the LAL embarked on an aggressive track rehab program, replacing many ties. The track to Rheims remains out of service, but is not abandoned. Beyond Rheims to Hammondsport the rails have been lifted.

As of August 2008, the B&H operates regular service between Cohocton and Painted Post. About half of a mile of the Hammondsport branch line is being used as a siding. The original line, designated at the Hammondsport Running Track, continues to be maintained for potential future service. Some new construction took place on the line from Bath to Painted Post just past the junction where dirt embankments have been built up as if additional sidings were going to be added. The railroad's main office and locomotive facility are located in Cohocton. A second engine house was built in Coopers Plains in 2012.

== Historic rolling stock ==
The last B&H steam locomotive was #11, was built by Alco at its Cooke Locomotive and Machine Works in Paterson, New Jersey, for a sugar railway in Cuba, but the order was never fulfilled. It was sold to the Narragansett Pier Railroad, before being sold to the Bath & Hammondsport. It was retired in 1949 and put into storage. The B&H sold #11 to Dr. Stanley A. Groman for display at his Rail City Railroad Museum in 1955. After Rail City closed, the locomotive was sold back to the Narragansett Pier Railroad in 1977 to be used in an excursion service which never began. In 1981 it was sold to the Middletown and New Jersey Railroad, again for possible excursion use that never came to fruition. It was sold to the Everett Railroad in 2006, where it was restored and returned to service.

The B&H replaced steam with two General Electric 44-ton switchers. These were eventually replaced with two ALCo S1s. One ALCo remains on the property and sees occasional use, as the other, a former New York Central unit, was acquired by the Rochester & Genesee Valley Railroad Museum in March 2025.
