= Thurston, New York =

- Town
- Location within the state of New York
- Coordinates: 42°13′32″N 77°16′39″W
- Country: United States
- State: New York
- County: Steuben

Area
  - Total: 36.52 sq mi (94.58 km^{2})
  - Land: 36.35 sq mi (94.15 km^{2})
  - Water: 0.17 sq mi (0.43 km^{2})
- Elevation: 1,634 ft (498 m)

Population (2020)
  - Total: 1,248 ▼
  - Estimate (2021): 1,235
  - Density: 35.8/sq mi (13.84/km^{2})
- Time zone: UTC-5 (Eastern (EST))
  - Summer (DST): UTC-4 (EDT)
- FIPS code: 36-73836
- GNIS feature ID: 0979546
- Website: https://townofthurstonny.gov/

Thurston is a town in Steuben County, New York, United States. The population was 1,248 at the 2020 United States census. The town is named after early landowner William Thurston.

The Town of Thurston is the east-central part of the county, northwest of Corning.

== History ==
Thurston was first settled circa 1813.

The town was formed from the Town of Cameron in the year 1844.

== Geography ==
According to the United States Census Bureau, the town has a total area of 36.5 square miles (95 km^{2}), of which 36.4 square miles (94 km^{2}) is land and 0.1 square miles (0.26 km^{2}) (0.25%) is water.

Former New York State Route 333 (decommissioned and now County Road 333) passes across the town.

== Demographics ==
Historical population
Census	Pop.	Note	%±
1850	726		—
1860	1,100		51.5%
1870	1,215		10.5%
1880	1,366		12.4%
1890	1,113		−18.5%
1900	1,017		−8.6%
1910	840		−17.4%
1920	674		−19.8%
1930	646		−4.2%
1940	607		−6.0%
1950	719		18.5%
1960	619		−13.9%
1970	810		30.9%
1980	986		21.7%
1990	1,054		6.9%
2000	1,309		24.2%
2010	1,350		3.1%
2020	1,248		−7.6%
2021 (est.)	1,235		−1.0%
U.S. Decennial Census

As of the census of 2000, there were 1,309 people, 462 households, and 351 families residing in the town. The population density was 35.9 inhabitants per square mile (13.9/km^{2}). There were 587 housing units at an average density of 16.1 per square mile (6.2/km^{2}). The racial makeup of the town was 97.78% White, 0.46% African American, 0.61% Native American, 0.23% Asian, and 0.92% from two or more races. Hispanic or Latino of any race were 0.84% of the population.

There were 462 households, out of which 39.0% had children under the age of 18 living with them, 61.9% were married couples living together, 7.4% had a female householder with no husband present, and 24.0% were non-families. 15.8% of all households were made up of individuals, and 5.0% had someone living alone who was 65 years of age or older. The average household size was 2.83 and the average family size was 3.20.

In the town, the population was spread out, with 29.6% under the age of 18, 6.8% from 18 to 24, 32.1% from 25 to 44, 23.2% from 45 to 64, and 8.3% who were 65 years of age or older. The median age was 35 years. For every 100 females, there were 102.6 males. For every 100 females age 18 and over, there were 102.2 males.

The median income for a household in the town was $36,375, and the median income for a family was $39,602. Males had a median income of $29,792 versus $20,909 for females. The per capita income for the town was $13,725. About 9.6% of families and 12.1% of the population were below the poverty line, including 13.9% of those under age 18 and 2.6% of those age 65 or over.

== Communities and locations in the Town of Thurston ==
- Bonny Hill – A hamlet in the northwest part of the town. It was the site of the first settlement and was named after early landowner Luke Bonny.
- North Thurston – A hamlet near the north town line on County Road 12.
- Risingville – A hamlet west of Thurston village, named after its first postmaster. It is at the junction of County Roads 11 and 24 and is the west terminus of County Road 333.
- South Thurston – A hamlet southeast of Thurston village, located on County Road 2.
- Thurston – The hamlet of Thurston is located on County Road 333 next to Michigan Creek at a widening called Thurston Pond. The community was formerly called "Merchantville" after early settler Edwin Merchant.
