= Cameron, New York =

- Town
- Location within the state of New York Cameron (the United States)
- Coordinates: 42°11′55″N 77°23′28″W
- Country: United States
- State: New York
- County: Steuben

Area
  - Total: 46.76 sq mi (121.11 km^{2})
  - Land: 46.70 sq mi (120.96 km^{2})
  - Water: 0.058 sq mi (0.15 km^{2})
- Elevation: 1,621 ft (494 m)

Population (2020)
  - Total: 898 ▼
  - Estimate (2021): 889
  - Density: 20/sq mi (7.7/km^{2})
- Time zone: UTC-5 (Eastern (EST))
  - Summer (DST): UTC-4 (EDT)
- ZIP code: 14819
- Area code: 607
- FIPS code: 36-11880
- GNIS feature ID: 0978778
- Website: https://www.townofcameron.us/

Cameron is a town in Steuben County, New York, United States. The population is 898 as of 2020. The town is named after Dugald Cameron, an early settler and land agent of the Pulteney Estate.

The Town of Cameron is centrally located in the county, west of the City of Corning.

== History ==
Around 1800, the first settler arrived near the present community of Cameron. The town was formed from the Town of Addison in 1822. Parts of Cameron were lost on the founding of the cities of Thurston (1844) and Rathbone (1856).

The New York and Erie Railroad line through Cameron opened in September 1850. The line, recently owned by the Norfolk Southern Railway, with trains operated by NS and Canadian Pacific (the latter under haulage arrangements), was destroyed by Hurricane Agnes in 1972 and had to be rebuilt afterward.

== Geography ==
According to the United States Census Bureau, the town has a total area of 46.8 square miles (121 km^{2}), of which 46.7 square miles (121 km^{2}) is land and 0.04 square miles (0.10 km^{2}) (0.04%) is water.

The Canisteo River flows through the town. Route 119 parallels the river.

== Demographics ==
Historical population
Census	Pop.	Note	%±
1830	924		—
1840	1,359		47.1%
1850	1,701		25.2%
1860	1,569		−7.8%
1870	1,334		−15.0%
1880	1,611		20.8%
1890	1,564		−2.9%
1900	1,353		−13.5%
1910	1,066		−21.2%
1920	779		−26.9%
1930	704		−9.6%
1940	664		−5.7%
1950	688		3.6%
1960	587		−14.7%
1970	741		26.2%
1980	917		23.8%
1990	916		−0.1%
2000	1,034		12.9%
2010	945		−8.6%
2020	898		−5.0%
2024 (est.)	893		−0.6%
U.S. Decennial Census

At the 2020 census, there were 899 people and 386 households. The population density was 19.2 inhabitants per square mile (7.4/km^{2}). There were 434 housing units at an average density of 9.27 per square mile (3.58/km^{2}). The racial makeup of the town was 92.7% White, 0.44% African American, 1.56% Hispanic or Latino, and 1.45% from other unspecified races. 5.23% of the population belongs to more than one race.

There were 365 occupied households, of which 51.5% were married-couple families, 6.8% had a female householder with no husband present, 7.1% had a male householder with no wife present, and 65.5% were non-families. The average household and family size was 2.84. At the time of the census, 57.9% of the population was married, 4.5% widowed, 12.6% divorced, and 2.4% separated. 22.6% were never married.

26.0% of the population was under the age of 18, with 7.6% under the age of 5. 74.0% were over 18, and 15% were 65 years of age or older. The median age was 38.1 years.

The median household income was $50,833. Among families, the median family income was $61,667, while among nonfamily households, it was $37,500. The per capita income was $15,455. About 23.6% of the population was below the poverty line, including 38.7% of those under age 18, 20.9% of those between the ages of 18 and 64, and 9.1% of those age 65 or over.

== Communities and locations in the Town of Cameron ==
- Bonny Hill – A location in the northeast part of the town, and northeast of North Cameron.
- Boyd's Corner – A location south of South Cameron on Jackson Hill Road.
- Cameron – The hamlet of Cameron is by the junction of County Roads 10 and 119 by the Canisteo River.
- Cameron Mills – A hamlet by the town line in the southeast part of the town.
- North Cameron – A hamlet near the north town line on County Road 10A.
- South Cameron – A hamlet southwest of Cameron hamlet, located on Jackson Hill Road.
- West Cameron – A hamlet northwest of Cameron hamlet on Route 119.

== Notable person ==
- William W. Averell (1832–1900), born in Cameron, United States Army officer and patentee of asphalt pavement
