= Wayland, New York =

Town in Steuben County, New York

Coordinates: 42°34′5″N 77°35′31″W

Wayland
- Town
- Interactive map of Wayland
- Country: United States
- State: New York
- County: Steuben
- Formed: 1848

Area
  - Total: 39.5 sq mi (102 km^{2})
  - Land: 39 sq mi (100 km^{2})
  - Water: 0.5 sq mi (1.3 km^{2})

Population (2020)
  - Total: 3,733
  - Density: 96/sq mi (37/km^{2})
- Time zone: UTC-5 (Eastern (EST))
  - Summer (DST): UTC-4 (EDT)
- Postal code: 14572
- Website: Town of Wayland Website

Wayland is a town in Steuben County, New York, United States. The population was 3,733 at the 2020 census.

The Town of Wayland contains a village called Wayland. The town is in the northern part of the county, northwest of Bath.

== History ==
The region was first settled by European Americans around 1806, after the Revolutionary War. In historic times, for centuries it had been territory inhabited by the Seneca Native Americans, one of the powerful five tribes of the Iroquois Confederacy.

The town was formed in 1848 from the Towns of Cohocton and Dansville. Part of Wayland was used to form the Town of Fremont in 1854.

The Rowe House is listed on the National Register of Historic Places.

On August 30, 1943, the Lackawanna Limited wreck, occurred when the Lackawanna Limited, flagship passenger train of the Delaware, Lackawanna and Western Railroad sideswiped a local freight that had not cleared into a siding, killing 29 people near the Gunlocke chair factory.

== Geography ==
According to the United States Census Bureau, the town has a total area of 39.5 square miles (102.4 km^{2}), of which 39.0 square miles (101.1 km^{2}) is land and 0.5 square mile (1.3 km^{2}) (1.31%) is water.

The northern and part of the western town lines form the border of Livingston County.

New York State Route 21 is a north-south highway in the town and intersects New York State Route 15 and New York State Route 63 in the village of Wayland. Interstate 390 crosses the town from west to east.

Wayland is the northern terminus of the B&H Rail Corp.'s Gang Mills–Wayland Line. Prior to 1956, it was linked to Rochester directly by rail and, prior to 1964, it was directly linked to Buffalo by rail. Both of these connections were removed by order of the ICC following application by the owning railroads. As the Erie Lackawanna Railway's former Lackawanna mainline from Buffalo had a steep grade eastbound from Groveland to Perkinsville that was easily bypassed by the former Erie mainline via Hornell, with far easier grades, the former Delaware, Lackawanna and Western Railroad mainline trackage between Groveland and Wayland was abandoned and torn-up in late 1963.

The Woodcroftery factory, which made wooden bowls and other wooden items, was located at Park St. and 2nd Ave.

== Demographics ==
Historical population
Census	Pop.	Note	%±
1850	2,067		—
1860	2,809		35.9%
1870	2,553		−9.1%
1880	2,591		1.5%
1890	2,334		−9.9%
1900	2,984		27.8%
1910	2,836		−5.0%
1920	3,004		5.9%
1930	3,071		2.2%
1940	3,078		0.2%
1950	3,178		3.2%
1960	3,385		6.5%
1970	3,546		4.8%
1980	3,881		9.4%
1990	4,311		11.1%
2000	4,314		0.1%
2010	4,102		−4.9%
2020	3,733		−9.0%
2021 (est.)	3,702	▼	−0.8%
U.S. Decennial Census

As of the census of 2000, there were 4,314 people, 1,665 households, and 1,168 families residing in the town. The population density was 110.5 inhabitants per square mile (42.7/km^{2}). There were 1,960 housing units at an average density of 50.2 per square mile (19.4/km^{2}). The racial makeup of the town was 97.47% White, 0.86% Black or African American, 0.44% Native American, 0.42% Asian, 0.12% from other races, and 0.70% from two or more races. Hispanic or Latino of any race were 0.86% of the population.

There were 1,665 households, out of which 35.6% had children under the age of 18 living with them, 52.3% were married couples living together, 12.5% had a female householder with no husband present, and 29.8% were non-families. 23.8% of all households were made up of individuals, and 10.5% had someone living alone who was 65 years of age or older. The average household size was 2.56 and the average family size was 3.03.

In the town, the population was spread out, with 27.9% under the age of 18, 6.9% from 18 to 24, 28.1% from 25 to 44, 23.7% from 45 to 64, and 13.4% who were 65 years of age or older. The median age was 38 years. For every 100 females, there were 96.6 males. For every 100 females age 18 and over, there were 94.0 males.

The median income for a household in the town was $42,575, and the median income for a family was $46,806. Males had a median income of $33,623 versus $22,439 for females. The per capita income for the town was $18,038. About 8.9% of families and 11.0% of the population were below the poverty line, including 15.8% of those under age 18 and 6.6% of those age 65 or over.

== Communities and locations in the Town of Wayland ==
- Loon Lake – A lake in the south part of the town.
- Patchinsville – A hamlet south of Wayland village on NY-21 at the junction of County Road 90 (Patchinville-Perkinsville Road).
- Perkinsville – A hamlet southwest of Wayland village and north of Interstate I-390, by the junction of County Roads 90 (Patchinville-Perkinsville Road) and 91
- Wayland – The Village of Wayland in the north part of the town.
