= Wayland (village), New York =

Wayland, New York
- Village
- Location within the state of New York
- Coordinates: 42°34′5″N 77°35′31″W
- Country: United States
- State: New York
- County: Steuben

Area
  - Total: 1.19 sq mi (3.08 km^{2})
  - Land: 1.13 sq mi (2.93 km^{2})
  - Water: 0.058 sq mi (0.15 km^{2})
- Elevation: 1,375 ft (419 m)

Population (2020)
  - Total: 1,680
  - Density: 1,487.2/sq mi (574.23/km^{2})
- Time zone: UTC-5 (Eastern (EST))
  - Summer (DST): UTC-4 (EDT)
- ZIP code: 14572
- Area code: 585
- FIPS code: 36-78850
- GNIS feature ID: 0968949
- Website: Village of Wayland

Wayland is a village in Steuben County, New York, United States. The population was 1,865 at the 2010 census.

The Village of Wayland is in the northern part of the Town of Wayland, near the northern border of Steuben County.

== History ==
The village was incorporated in 1877. The village grew after it was selected as a station on the Erie Railroad.

== Geography ==
Wayland is located at 42°34′5″N 77°35′30″W (42.568131, -77.591854).

According to the United States Census Bureau, the village has a total area of 1.0 square mile (2.7 km^{2}), all land.

Wayland is in the northwestern part of the county, near the border of Livingston County and just north of Interstate 390 at the junction of NY-15, NY-21 and NY-63. County Road 93 also leads into the village from the north.

Wayland is the northern terminal of the B&H Rail Corporation's Painted Post-to-Wayland railroad line: the surviving portion of the Delaware. Lackawanna & Western Railroad Main Line between Binghamton and Buffalo.

Wayland was formerly located on the New York City (Hoboken)-to-Buffalo Main Line of the Delaware, Lackawanna & Western Railroad and on the New York City (Jersey City)-to-Rochester Main Line of the Erie Railroad. Both of these routes were abandoned and partially or fully-dismantled through Wayland by order of the United States Interstate Commerce Commission, upon application of the owning railroads. Upon the 1960 merger of the Delaware, Lackawanna and Western Railroad and the Erie Railroad, the new Erie Lackawanna Railroad obtained the ability to abandon the Groveland-Wayland portion of its former DL&W Buffalo-Hoboken, NJ mainline, thus eliminating a steep southbound (railroad east) grade that had operationally tormented the DL&W for 81 years (since 1882). The EL rerouted its combined Buffalo-Hoboken operation to the Erie Buffalo-Hoboken mainline, via Hornell, when the former DL&W track was lifted in 1963.

== Demographics ==
Historical population
| Census | Pop. | Note | %± |
|---|---|---|---|
| 1880 | 605 | | — |
| 1890 | 679 | | 12.2% |
| 1900 | 1,307 | | 92.5% |
| 1910 | 1,392 | | 6.5% |
| 1920 | 1,790 | | 28.6% |
| 1930 | 1,814 | | 1.3% |
| 1940 | 1,795 | | −1.0% |
| 1950 | 1,834 | | 2.2% |
| 1960 | 2,003 | | 9.2% |
| 1970 | 2,022 | | 0.9% |
| 1980 | 1,846 | | −8.7% |
| 1990 | 1,976 | | 7.0% |
| 2000 | 1,893 | | −4.2% |
| 2010 | 1,865 | | −1.5% |
| 2020 | 1,680 | | −9.9% |
U.S. Decennial Census

As of the census of 2000, there were 1,893 people, 743 households, and 502 families residing in the village. The population density was 1,831.3 inhabitants per square mile (707.1/km^{2}). There were 808 housing units at an average density of 781.7 per square mile (301.8/km^{2}). The racial makeup of the village was 97.36% White, 1.11% Black or African American, 0.26% Native American, 0.48% Asian, 0.26% from other races, and 0.53% from two or more races. Hispanic or Latino of any race were 1.06% of the population.

There were 743 households, out of which 34.9% had children under the age of 18 living with them, 49.0% were married couples living together, 14.0% had a female householder with no husband present, and 32.4% were non-families. 26.9% of all households were made up of individuals, and 12.5% had someone living alone who was 65 years of age or older. The average household size was 2.50 and the average family size was 3.02.

In the village, the population was spread out, with 27.7% under the age of 18, 6.7% from 18 to 24, 29.1% from 25 to 44, 22.0% from 45 to 64, and 14.6% who were 65 years of age or older. The median age was 37 years. For every 100 females, there were 93.4 males. For every 100 females age 18 and over, there were 90.1 males.

The median income for a household in the village was $40,598, and the median income for a family was $44,401. Males had a median income of $32,240 versus $22,500 for females. The per capita income for the village was $18,316. About 6.9% of families and 7.8% of the population were below the poverty line, including 13.0% of those under age 18 and none of those age 65 or over.
