= Cohocton River =

River in New York, United States

- Location of the mouth of the Cohocton River in New York State. Cohocton River (the United States)

Location
- Country: United States
- State: New York
- Region: Western New York

Physical characteristics
- Source
  - location: Tabor Corners, Livingston County
  - coordinates: 42°39′26″N 77°31′56″W
- Mouth: Chemung River
  - location: Painted Post, Steuben County
  - coordinates: 42°09′07″N 77°05′25″W
- Length: 58.5 mi (94.1 km)
- Basin size: 474.3 sq mi (1,228 km^{2})
- Discharge
  - location: Campbell
  - average: 467 cu ft/s (13.2 m^{3}/s)
  - minimum: 8 cu ft/s (0.23 m^{3}/s) (September 6, 1934)
  - maximum: 41,100 cu ft/s (1,160 m^{3}/s) (July 8, 1935)

The Cohocton River, sometimes referred to as the Conhocton River, is a 58.5-mile-long (94.1 km) tributary of the Chemung River in western New York in the United States. Via the Chemung River, it is part of the Susquehanna River watershed, flowing to the Chesapeake Bay. The name "Cohocton" is derived from an Iroquois term, Ga-ha-to, meaning "log floating in the water" or "trees in the water".

New York State Route 17 follows the valley of the river along much of its route through Steuben County. The river is a popular destination for fly fishing.

== History ==
In the 1820s the New York State Legislature commissioned a study for the building of a canal that would link the Cohocton at Bath to Keuka Lake (Crooked Lake) and Seneca Lake. The Crooked Lake Canal connecting the two lakes was built, but the link to the Cohocton was never completed.

== Course and watershed ==
The Cohocton River rises in southeastern Livingston County, approximately 15 miles (24 km) northeast of Dansville in Tabor Corners. It flows generally southeast through rural Steuben County, in a winding course through a valley of the Allegheny Plateau, past Cohocton, Avoca and Bath. At Painted Post, just west of Corning, it is joined by the Tioga River from the southwest to form the Chemung, a tributary of the Susquehanna River.

The 474.3-square-mile (1,228 km^{2}) watershed of the Cohocton River is largely undeveloped, with 61.9 percent being forested, 35.8 percent in agriculture, and only 1.5 percent urban.

== See also ==
- List of New York rivers
