= Interstate 99 =

Interstate Highway in Pennsylvania and New York

Interstate 99
- I-99 highlighted in red and Future I-99 in blue

Route information
- Existed: November 6, 1998–present
- NHS: Entire route

Southern segment
- Length: 85.78 mi (138.05 km)
- South end: US 220 / US 220 Bus. near Bedford, PA
- Major intersections: PA 56 near Cessna, PA; US 22 near Altoona, PA; PA 453 in Tyrone, PA; US 322 near State College, PA; PA 150 near Bellefonte, PA; PA 26 near Pleasant Gap, PA
- North end: US 220 / PA 26 near Bellefonte, PA

Northern segment
- Length: 75.90 mi (122.15 km)
- South end: I-180 / US 15 / US 220 in Williamsport, PA
- Major intersections: US 6 in Mansfield, PA; NY 417 near Addison, NY
- North end: I-86 / US 15 / NY 17 / NY 352 near Painted Post, NY

Location
- Country: United States
- States: Pennsylvania, New York
- Counties: PA: Bedford, Blair, Centre, Lycoming, Tioga; NY: Steuben

Highway system
- Interstate Highway System; Main; Auxiliary; Suffixed; Business; Future
← PA 98	PA	→ PA 99
← NY 98	NY	→ NY 99

Interstate 99 (I-99) is an Interstate Highway in the United States with two segments: one located in central Pennsylvania and the other in northern Pennsylvania into southern New York along US 15. The southern terminus of the route is near exit 146 of the Pennsylvania Turnpike (I-70/I-76) north of Bedford, where the road continues south as U.S. Route 220 (US 220). The northern terminus of the southern segment is at an at-grade intersection with Musser Lane near I-80 near Bellefonte. The northern segment is entirely concurrent with US 15, beginning at I-180 in Williamsport northward into New York to an interchange with I-86 in Corning. Within Pennsylvania, I-99 passes through Altoona and State College—the latter home to the Pennsylvania State University—and is almost entirely concurrent with US 220.

As of 2026, a roughly 50-mile (80 km) gap in the route remains between Bellefonte and Williamsport. Long-term plans call for the two segments to be connected using portions of I-80 and US 220.

Unlike most interstate highway numbers, which were assigned by the American Association of State Highway and Transportation Officials (AASHTO) to fit into a grid, I-99's number was written into Section 332 of the National Highway System Designation Act of 1995 by Bud Shuster, then-chair of the US House Committee on Transportation and Infrastructure, the bill's sponsor, and the representative of the district through which the highway runs. I-99 breaks the AASHTO numbering pattern associated with Interstate Highways, as it would be expected to lie east of I-97 but instead lies east of I-79 and west of I-81.

== Route description ==
Lengths
	mi	km
PA	149.00	239.79
NY	12.68	20.41
Total	161.68	260.20

=== Southern segment ===
I-99 begins at an indirect interchange with US 220 and the Pennsylvania Turnpike (I-70/I-76) north of Bedford. It begins concurrent with US 220, which continues south from the interchange toward the Maryland state line as a two-lane highway known as the Appalachian Thruway. To access the turnpike, drivers are required to use a short segment of US 220 Business (US 220 Bus.). North of the turnpike junction, the freeway becomes the Bud Shuster Highway as it heads through a rural portion of Bedford County. It connects to Pennsylvania Route 56 (PA 56) just west of Bedford County Airport at exit 3 and PA 869 at exit 7 before crossing into Blair County. Here, it meets PA 164 north of East Freedom at exit 23 prior to entering the Altoona area.

In Hollidaysburg, a borough south of the city, I-99 and US 220 connect to US 22 at exit 28, a large modified trumpet interchange. This junction allows travelers to head west toward Ebensburg, Johnstown, and Pittsburgh. The freeway continues to Altoona itself, where it indirectly connects to PA 36 via exit 32. Unlike the original routing of US 220 which goes through the city center, I-99 and US 220 mostly bypass it to the east, connecting to the city via streets leading eastward from the downtown district. At the northern edge of Altoona, PA 764 joins the old alignment of US 220 and parallels I-99 north for three miles (4.8 km) toward Bellwood. PA 764 leaves old US 220 about two miles (3.2 km) south of Bellwood, however, and terminates at I-99 exit 39. Bellwood itself is served by exit 41, which leads to PA 865.

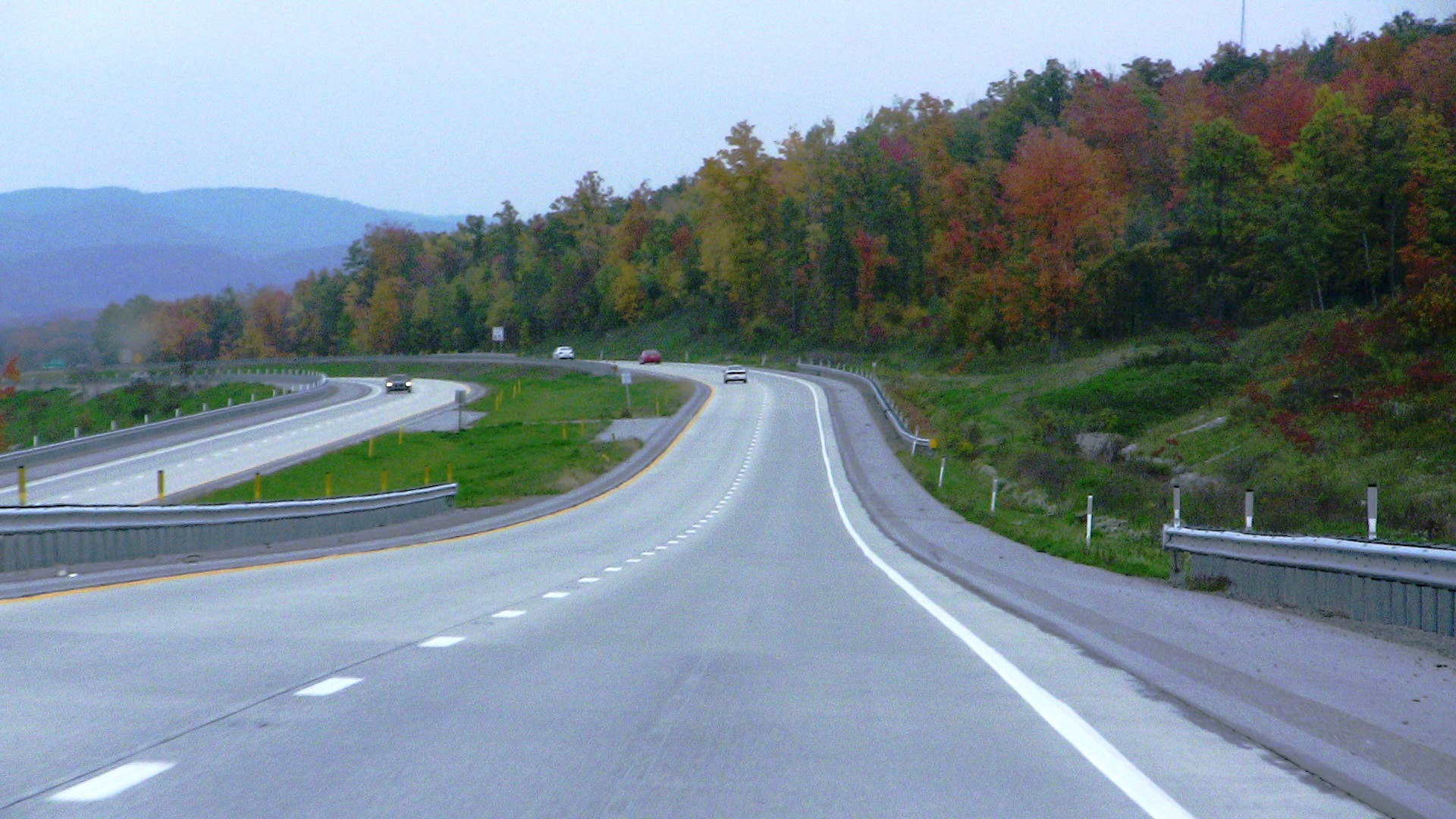
I-99 north near Bald Eagle, Pennsylvania in October 2011

The highway veers northeastward from Bellwood to serve the borough of Tyrone, located at the junction of old US 220 and PA 453. Access to the borough is made by way of exit 48, which serves PA 453. Past Tyrone, I-99 and US 220 head through sparsely populated areas of Blair and Centre counties. For this reason, only three exits exist between Tyrone and State College: exit 52, serving PA 350 and the small community of Bald Eagle, and exits 61 and 62, which connect to US 322 and the borough of Port Matilda. Here, US 322 joins I-99 and US 220 and follows them eastward to the State College area.

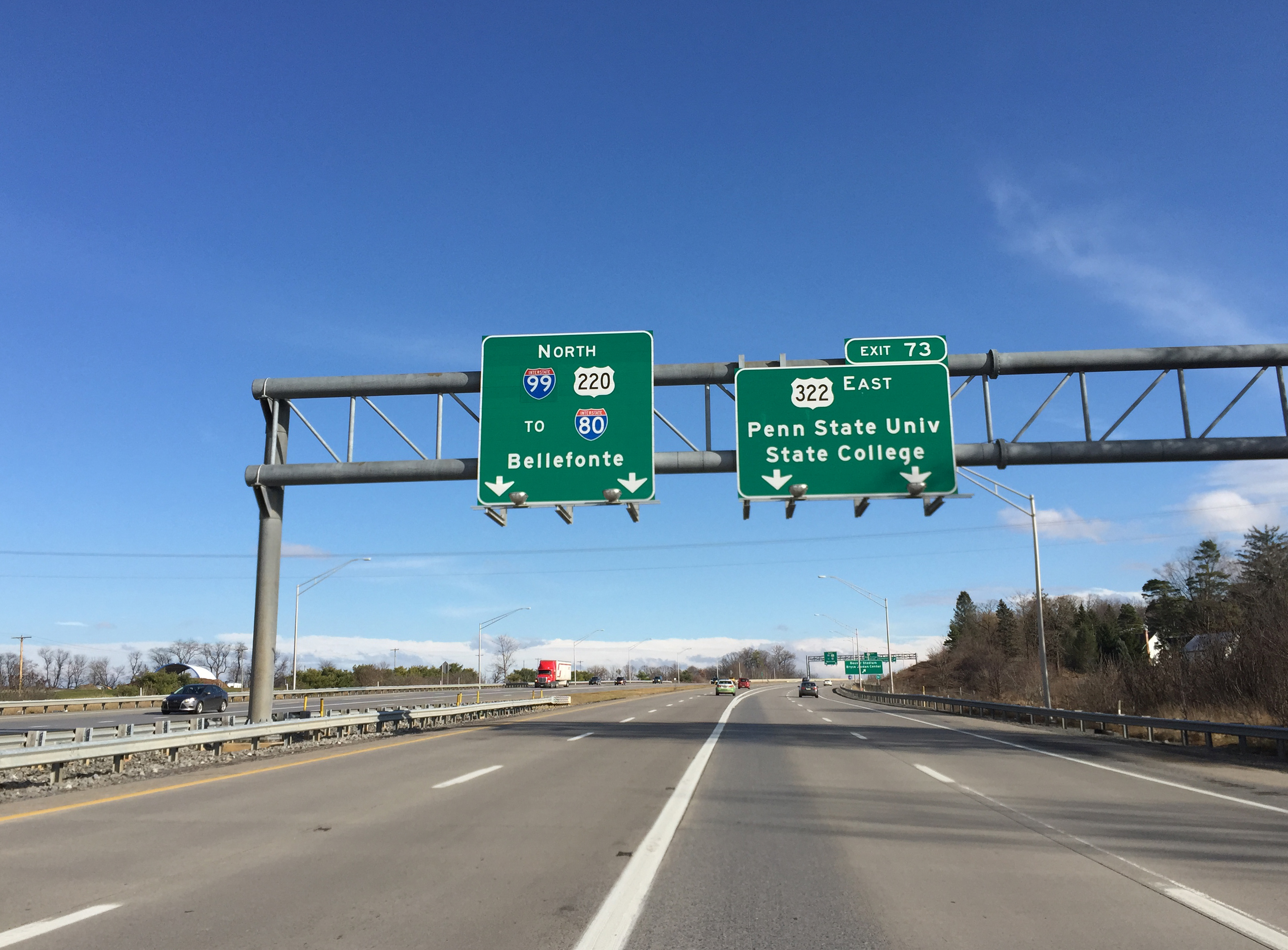
I-99/US 220 northbound at split with US 322 eastbound in College Township, near State College

At exit 68 (US 322 Bus.), I-99 merges into the Mount Nittany Expressway, an older, northerly bypass of State College. I-99, US 220, and US 322 follow the expressway to the Mount Nittany Interchange, a directional T interchange located on the northern fringe of the Pennsylvania State University campus. Beaver Stadium, the home of the Penn State Nittany Lions football team, is visible from I-99 at this point. US 322 continues east through the interchange to follow the Mount Nittany Expressway while I-99 and US 220 split from US 322 and head northeastward toward Pleasant Gap, which I-99 connects to via exit 81 and PA 26. At this point, PA 26 joins the freeway and follows it to Bellefonte, served by exit 83 and PA 550. The southern segment of I-99 ends about 1.75 miles (2.82 km) later at an intersection with Musser Lane though the divided highway continues 0.33 miles (0.53 km) northeast to an interchange with I-80, where PA 26 continues north and US 220 joins I-80 east.

=== Northern segment ===
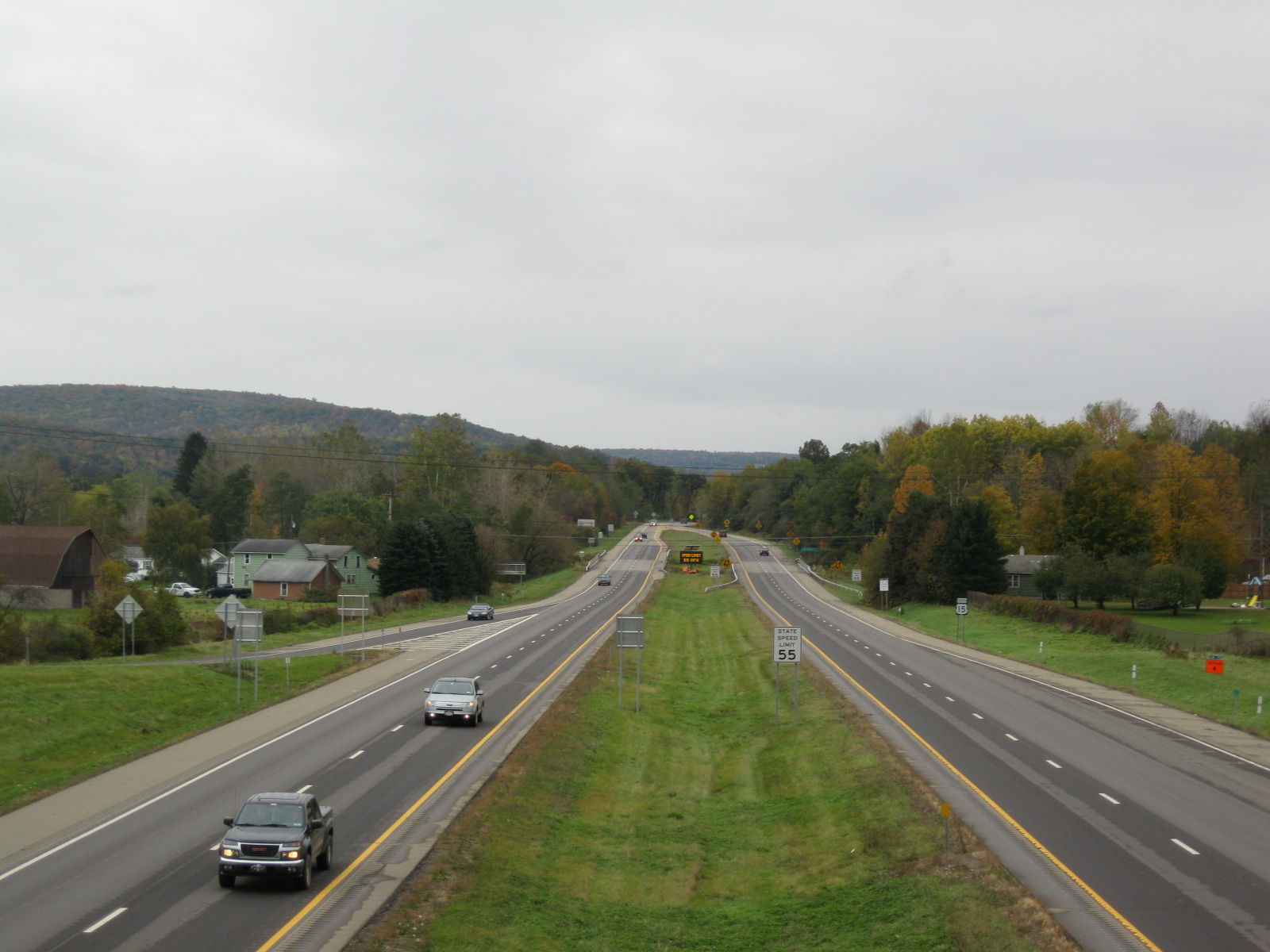
Looking southward along US 15 (now I-99) from the Smith Road overpass in Presho prior to the road's completion. The highway previously narrowed from four to two lanes in the background.

The northern segment of I-99 is entirely concurrent with US 15 and starts at the junction of US 220, US 15, and I-180. I-99 crosses through mountainous terrain in Lycoming and Tioga counties, bypassing Mansfield. The route crosses the Pennsylvania–New York border north of Lawrenceville, Pennsylvania. A four-lane freeway through the Steuben County town of Lindley, I-99 crosses through a rock cut, making a large bend to the north and bypassing the hamlet of Presho. The freeway enters a partial cloverleaf interchange with County Route 5 (CR 5; Smith Road). After CR 5, I-99 turns northeast through the town of Erwin, running to the west of the Indian Hills Golf Club. Making a gradual bend further to the northeast, the freeway crosses the Canisteo River and enters the hamlet of Erwins, where it enters a diamond interchange with New York State Route 417 (NY 417; Addison Road). After NY 417, it then turns alongside Norfolk Southern Railway's Southern Tier Line (former Erie Railroad main line). Now paralleling the tracks and NY 417, I-99/US 15 crosses through Erwin, entering exit 11, which connects to NY 417 once again, next to Gang Mills Yard, the site of former Painted Post station.

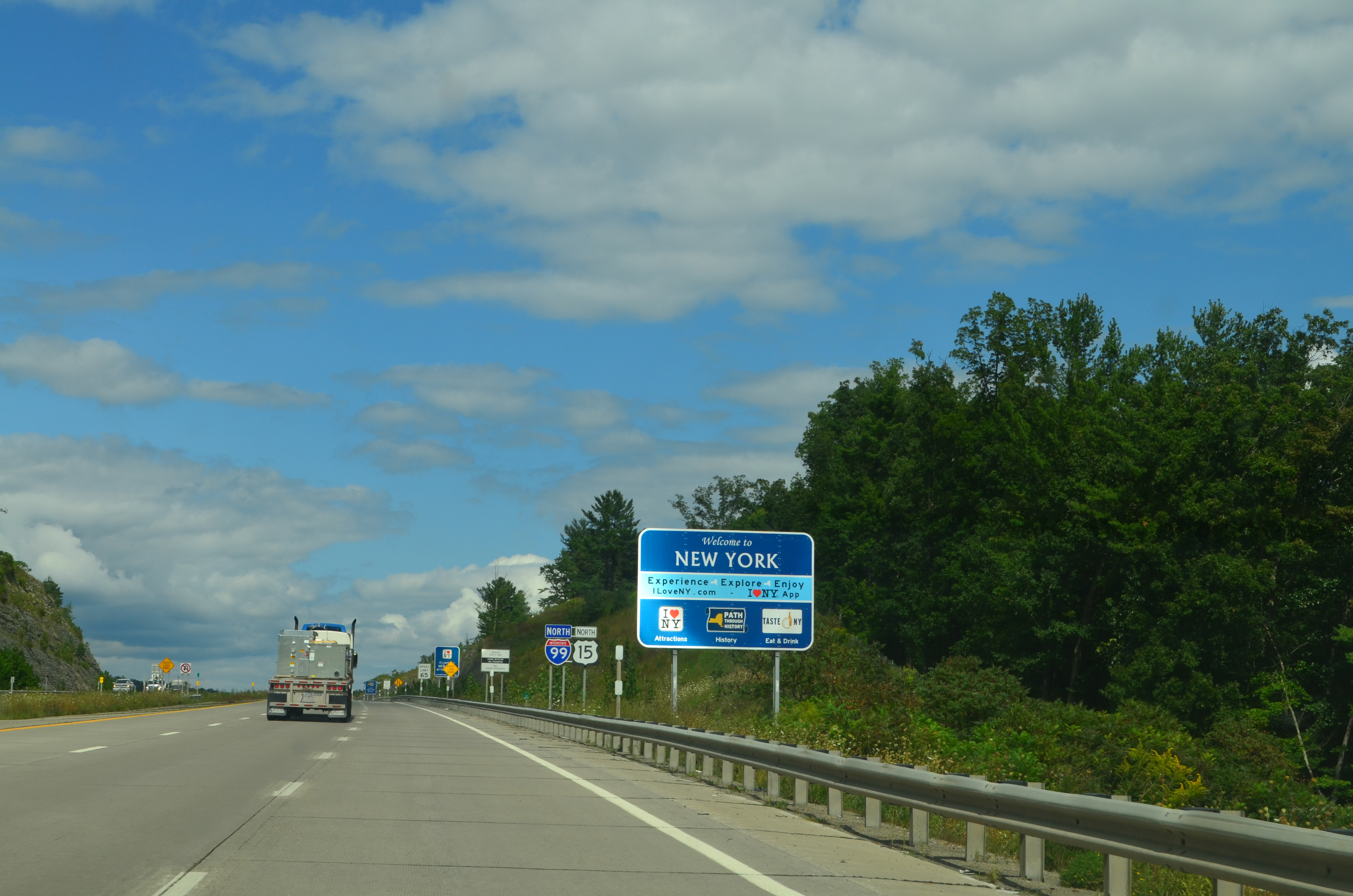
I-99/US 15 entering New York

After Gang Mills Yard, I-99 crosses through the Gang Mills section of Erwin, entering a large interchange at the northern end of the neighborhood. Signed exit 12, this interchange serves CR 107 (Robert Dann Drive) via NY 417. After CR 107, I-99 enters a large interchange that utilizes several flyover ramps between I-99, US 15, I-86, and NY 17 (Southern Tier Expressway). Ramps are also present, connecting to NY 352. This interchange serves as the northern terminus of both I-99 and US 15.

== History ==
=== Origins ===
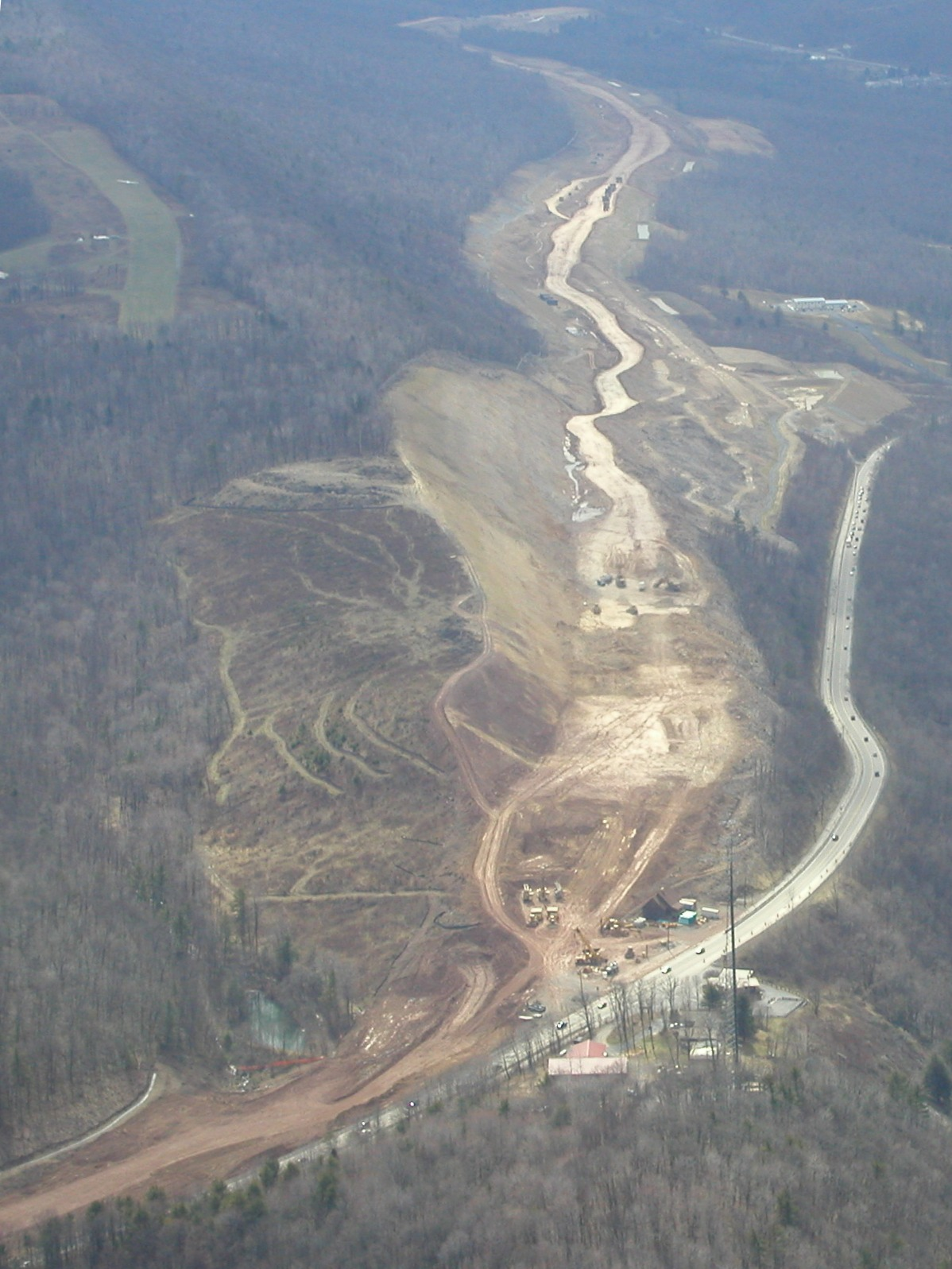
2002 photo of the I-99 excavation, looking south from Julian at the area where acidic rock was exposed on Bald Eagle Mountain

Corridor O of the Appalachian Development Highway System was assigned in 1965, running from Cumberland, Maryland (Corridor E, now I-68) to Bellefonte (I-80) along US 220. The portion in Pennsylvania, from Bedford north to Bald Eagle, was upgraded to a freeway in stages from the 1960s to the 1990s. The first section, from US 30 in Bedford to PA 56 near Cessna, opened in the latter half of the 1960s. Two more sections—from PA 56 north to modern exit 15 in Blair County and from Charlottsville (exit 45) to Bald Eagle—were completed in the 1970s. The portion between exit 15 and Altoona (exit 33) was finished in the 1980s while the segment between modern exits 33 and 45 was opened by 1997.

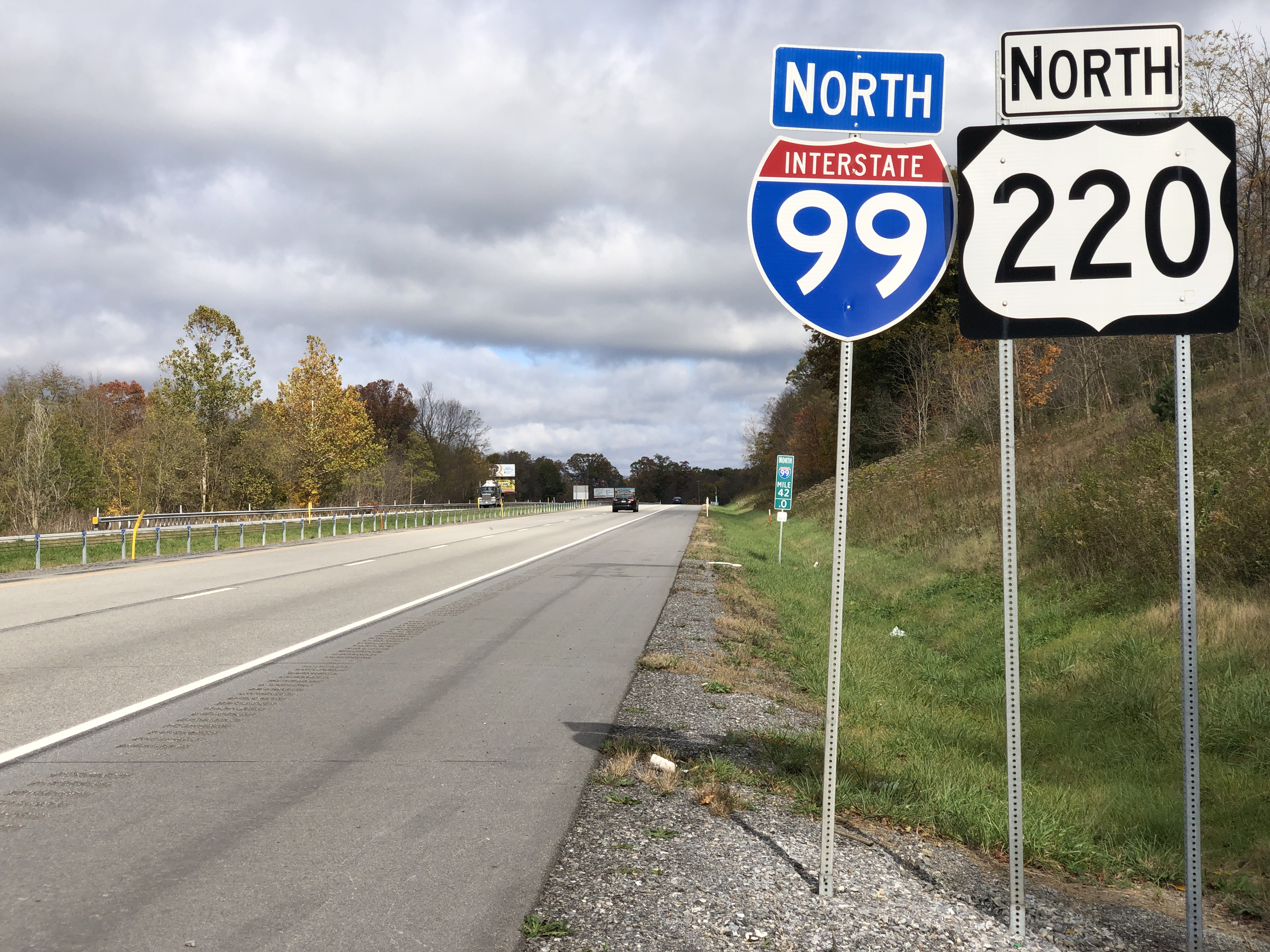
I-99 and US 220 northbound past PA 865 near Bellwood

In 1991, the Intermodal Surface Transportation Efficiency Act (ISTEA) was signed into law. It included a number of High Priority Corridors, one of which—Corridor 9—ran along US 220 from Bedford to Williamsport, and then north on US 15 to Corning, New York. The National Highway System Designation Act of 1995 amended ISTEA; among these amendments were that "the portion of the route referred to in subsection (c)(9) [Corridor 9] is designated as Interstate Route I-99." This was the first interstate highway number to be written into law rather than to be assigned by AASHTO. The number was specified by Representative Bud Shuster, who said that the standard spur numbering was not "catchy"; instead, I-99 was named after a street car, No. 99, that took people from Shuster's hometown of Glassport to McKeesport. I-99 breaks the AASHTO numbering pattern associated with interstate highways, since it lies east of I-79 but west of I-81 (the number suggests it would be located very close to the Atlantic Ocean, east of I-95).

=== Designation and Bald Eagle Mountain ===
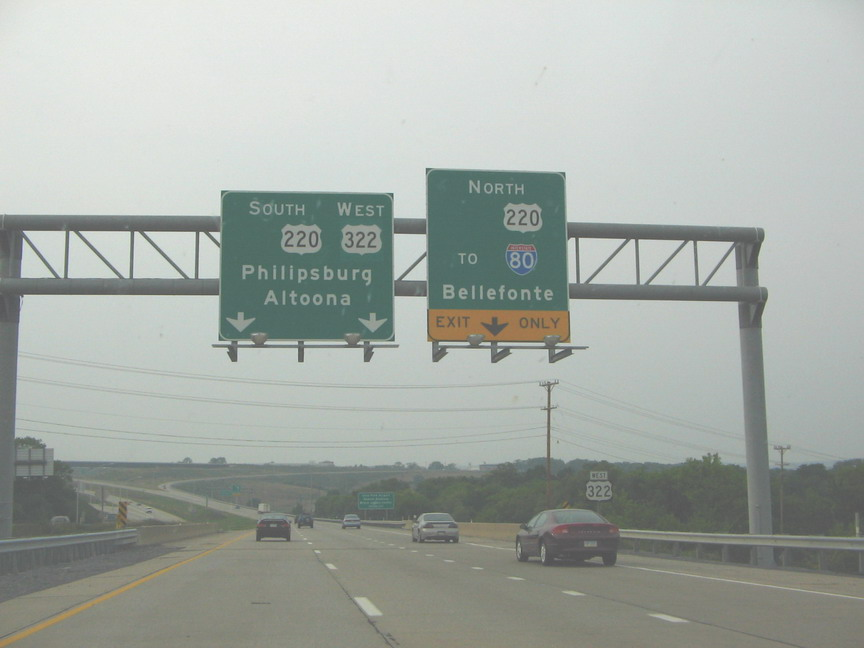
2006 photo of the westbound approach to the Mount Nittany Interchange on westbound US 322. The blank spots on the overhead signs were reserved for I-99 shields, which have since been put up.

On November 6, 1998, AASHTO formally approved the I-99 designation, which initially extended 51.2 miles (82.4 km) from the Pennsylvania Turnpike in Bedford to PA 350 in Bald Eagle. In 2002, plans were set in motion to extend I-99 northeast from Bald Eagle to State College via Port Matilda. The extension was fraught with issues, however. The proposed alignment for the highway north to Port Matilda proved to be controversial: while environmentalists called for I-99 to be constructed in the valley below Bald Eagle Mountain, the Pennsylvania Department of Transportation (PennDOT) and valley residents favored a routing that took the freeway above the valley and along the side of the ridge. Farther north, the widening of Skytop, the mountain cut that US 322 uses to traverse Bald Eagle Mountain, resulted in the exposure of acidic pyrite rock in 2003.

Work on the segment ceased one year later as PennDOT attempted to stop the flow of acidic runoff from the site. The state remedied the situation by removing 1,000,000 cubic yards (760,000 m^{3}) of pyrite and replacing it with a mix of limestone and fill, a process that took two years and cost $83 million (equivalent to $137 million in 2025). With the environmental issues settled, construction resumed on the portion of the freeway south of Skytop Mountain. The section from Bald Eagle to Port Matilda was opened to traffic on December 17, 2007, while the remaining section between Port Matilda and the west end of the Mount Nittany Expressway near State College was completely opened on November 17, 2008. In all, the 18-mile Bald Eagle–State College section of I-99 cost $631 million (equivalent to $944 million in 2025) to construct.

I-99/US 220 northbound/US 322 eastbound in Patton Township

I-99 was extended northeastward to meet I-80 northeast of Bellefonte following the completion of the Bald Eagle–State College segment. The connection was made by way of the preexisting Mount Nittany Expressway and another, unnamed limited-access highway connecting the State College bypass to the Bellefonte area. The portion of the latter highway north of the PA 26 interchange was originally built in the 1970s as a two-lane freeway connecting Pleasant Gap to I-80. At the time, it was designated solely as PA 26. It was widened to four lanes in 1997. US 220 was rerouted via US 322 and the new road, and the old alignment of US 220 north of US 322 was designated US 220 Alternate (US 220 Alt.) on May 30, 2003. This extension, however, did not include an interchange with I-80, resulting in I-99 terminating at an at-grade intersection with Musser Lane just before reaching I-80.

Farther north, one short segment of two-lane highway remained between Lawrenceville, Pennsylvania, and Presho, New York, almost entirely within New York. In the early 2010s, five miles (8.0 km) of new freeway was constructed to connect the existing freeway segments. This provided through traffic with a continuous freeway from Williamsport, Pennsylvania, to Corning, New York, and removed traffic from the overburdened two-lane section of US 15, which was retired to county route status as CR 115. On June 27, 2014, New York Governor Andrew Cuomo announced that the interstate-grade US 15 freeway from the Pennsylvania border to I-86 in Corning was officially signed as I-99.

In November 2024, AASHTO approved extending the northern segment 62 miles (100 km) south from the New York state line to I-180 in Williamsport, running entirely concurrently with US 15. On July 30, 2026, this signage was officially unveiled.

== Future ==
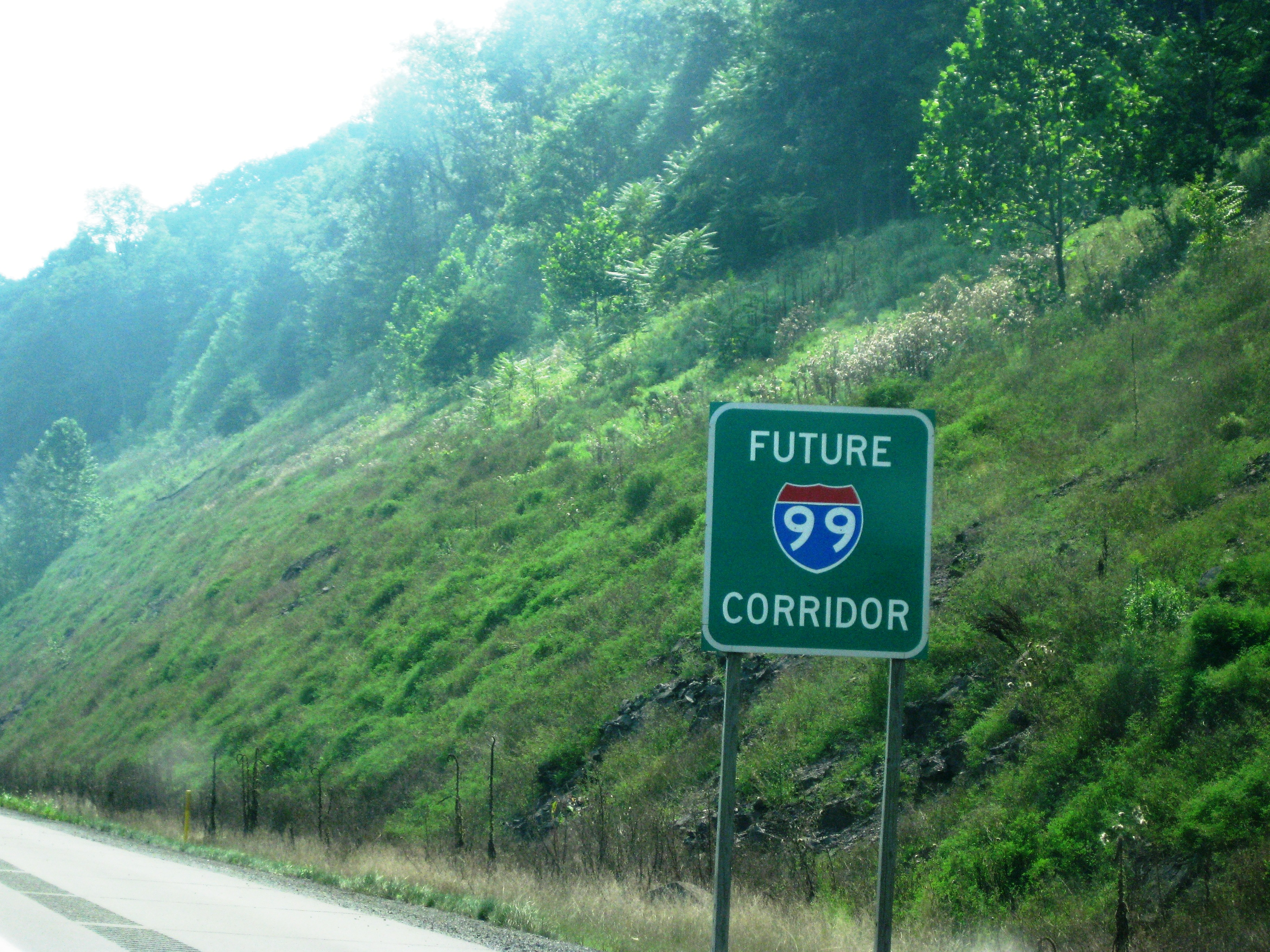
"Future I-99 Corridor" sign on US 15 southbound north of Williamsport in 2009

Though there is no specific date for completion, long-term plans call for the two segments of I-99 to be connected via US 220 from Bellefonte to Williamsport, running concurrent with I-80 as US 220 currently does. Some sections of US 220 still require upgrades, primarily in the vicinity of both interchanges with I-80 and between Jersey Shore and Linden.

PennDOT is currently in the process of building a high-speed interchange connecting I-99 to I-80 near Bellefonte. The new interchange will eliminate local access between PA 26 (Jacksonville Road) and I-80, which is provided by a new exit two miles (3.2 km) to the east. The first phase of the project built the local access interchange between PA 26 and I-80. Construction on the local access interchange began on July 27, 2020. The local access interchange was opened to traffic on November 10, 2022, with a ribbon-cutting ceremony held. The local access interchange between PA 26 and I-80 was funded in part by a $35-million federal grant, with a total estimated cost of $52 million. The second phase of the project will make improvements to Jacksonville Road between the new interchange and the junction between I-80, and the third phase will build the high-speed interchange between I-80 and I-99. Bidding on the second and third phases was planned to begin in March 2022, with the improvements to Jacksonville Road to be finished by December 2023 and the high-speed interchange to be completed by December 2025. However, the bids for the other phases had not been released as of May 2023. As of June 2024, bidding began on the final phases. The second phase, the Jacksonville Road (PA 26) project, is expected to take two years, cost $6.9 million, and completion is now scheduled for the middle of 2026. Completion of the third and final phase, the $246 million high-speed interchange, is now expected in 2030.

During a 2002 taskforce meeting for I-99, it was suggested that I-390, which extends north from I-86 24 miles (39 km) west of the I-86/I-99 junction near Corning and which crosses I-90 and terminates in the greater Rochester metropolitan area, be redesignated as I-99 once the I-80 to I-86 portion of that route is completed. The idea posits that I-390 is a logical extension of the I-99 corridor because I-99's predecessor, US 15, originally extended to Rochester. No official moves to accomplish this have been taken.

== Exit list ==
State	County	Location	mi	km	Exit	Destinations	Notes
Pennsylvania	Bedford	Bedford Township	0.000	0.000		US 220 south to US 30 – Cumberland	Southern end of US 220 concurrency; continuation south
Pennsylvania	Bedford	Bedford Township	0.000	0.000	1	To I-70 Toll / I-76 Toll / Penna Turnpike – Pittsburgh, Harrisburg	Access via US 220 Bus.
Pennsylvania	Bedford	Bedford Township	2.892	4.654	3	PA 56 (US 220 Bus. south) – Johnstown, Cessna	
Pennsylvania	Bedford	East St. Clair Township	6.597	10.617	7	PA 869 – St. Clairsville, Osterburg	
Pennsylvania	Bedford	King Township	10.112	16.274	10	Blue Knob State Park	Access via Sarah Furnace Road
Pennsylvania	Blair	Greenfield Township	14.900	23.979	15	Claysburg, King	Access via US 220 Bus.
Pennsylvania	Blair	Freedom Township	22.798	36.690	23	PA 36 / PA 164 to US 22 east – Roaring Spring, Portage, Hollidaysburg	
Pennsylvania	Blair	Allegheny Township	28.045	45.134	28	US 22 – Ebensburg, Hollidaysburg	
Pennsylvania	Blair	Logan Township	30.507	49.096	31	Plank Road (US 220 Bus.)	Access to Logan Valley Mall
Pennsylvania	Blair	Logan Township	31.803	51.182	32	Frankstown Road to PA 36	Access to Lakemont Park and Peoples Natural Gas Field
Pennsylvania	Blair	Logan Township	32.921	52.981	33	17th Street	Access to Logan Town Centre
Pennsylvania	Blair	Antis Township	38.521	61.994	39	PA 764 south – Pinecroft	Northern terminus of PA 764
Pennsylvania	Blair	Antis Township	41.193	66.294	41	PA 865 north – Bellwood	Southern terminus of PA 865
Pennsylvania	Blair	Antis Township	45.004	72.427	45	Tipton, Grazierville	Access via Pleasant Valley Boulevard; access to DelGrosso's Amusement Park
Pennsylvania	Blair	Tyrone	47.529	76.491	48	PA 453 – Tyrone	To PA 550 and Huntingdon
Pennsylvania	Blair	Snyder Township	51.592	83.029	52	PA 350 (US 220 Bus. south) – Bald Eagle, Philipsburg	
Pennsylvania	Centre	Worth Township	61.437	98.873	61	Port Matilda	Access via US 220 Alt.
Pennsylvania	Centre	Worth Township	62.243	100.170	62	US 322 west – Philipsburg	Southern end of US 322 concurrency; southbound exit and northbound entrance
Pennsylvania	Centre	Patton Township	68.993	111.033	68	Grays Woods, Waddle	Access via Grays Woods Boulevard/Atherton Street
Pennsylvania	Centre	Patton Township	69.706– 70.200	112.181– 112.976	69	US 322 Bus. east (Atherton Street) / Valley Vista Drive – Park Forest	Signed for US 322 Bus./Atherton northbound, Valley Vista/Park Forest southbound; western terminus of US 322 Bus.
Pennsylvania	Centre	Patton Township	71.122	114.460	71	Toftrees, Woodycrest	Access via Waddle Road
Pennsylvania	Centre	College Township	73.944	119.001	73	US 322 east – State College, Lewistown	Northern end of US 322 concurrency
Pennsylvania	Centre	College Township	75.067	120.809	74	Innovation Park, Penn State University	Access via Park Avenue; access to Beaver Stadium and Bryce Jordan Center
Pennsylvania	Centre	Benner Township	76.484	123.089	76	Shiloh Road	
Pennsylvania	Centre	Benner Township	78.991	127.124	78	PA 150 – Bellefonte	Signed as exits 78A (south) and 78B (north)
Pennsylvania	Centre	Spring Township	81.232	130.730	80	Harrison Road	Northbound exit and southbound entrance
Pennsylvania	Centre	Spring Township	81.728	131.528	81	PA 26 south to PA 64 – Pleasant Gap	Southern end of PA 26 concurrency
Pennsylvania	Centre	Spring Township	83.605	134.549	83	PA 550 – Bellefonte, Zion	
Pennsylvania	Centre	Spring Township	85.780	138.050		US 220 north / PA 26 north to I-80	Northern end of US 220/PA 26 concurrency; continuation north
Pennsylvania	Gap in designation, connection made via US 220						
Pennsylvania	Lycoming	Williamsport	131.67	211.90		I-180 east / US 15 south / US 220 – Montoursville, Lewisburg, Lock Haven	Southern end of US 15 concurrency; current southern terminus; western terminus and exit 29 on I-180
Pennsylvania	Lycoming	Williamsport	132.09	212.58	136	Third Street	Northbound exit and entrance
Pennsylvania	Lycoming	Williamsport	132.37	213.03	136	Fourth Street	Southbound exit and entrance
Pennsylvania	Lycoming	Old Lycoming Township	132.99	214.03	137	Foy Avenue, High Street, Lycoming Creek Road	
Pennsylvania	Lycoming	Lycoming Township	136.34	219.42	140	Hepburnville	
Pennsylvania	Lycoming	Lycoming Township	138.90	223.54	143	PA 973 – Perryville, Cogan Station	Southbound exit only
Pennsylvania	Lycoming	Lewis Township	144.00	231.75	148	PA 14 north – Trout Run, Canton	Southern terminus of PA 14
Pennsylvania	Lycoming	Cogan House Township	148.27	238.62	152	Cogan House (Green Mountain Road)	Southbound exit and entrance; connected to Steam Valley Road via State Route 4011
Pennsylvania	Lycoming	Cogan House Township	148.89	239.62	152	Cogan House (Steam Valley Road)	Northbound exit and entrance; access via State Route 4011
Pennsylvania	Lycoming	Cogan House Township	150.90	242.85	155	PA 184 west – Steam Valley	Eastern terminus of PA 184
Pennsylvania	Lycoming	Jackson Township	153.68	247.32	158	PA 284 west – Buttonwood, English Center	Eastern terminus of PA 284
Pennsylvania	Tioga	Liberty	158.81	255.58	162	PA 414 – Liberty, Morris	
Pennsylvania	Tioga	Liberty	160.96	259.04	165	Sebring	
Pennsylvania	Tioga	Blossburg	168.08	270.50	172	Blossburg	
Pennsylvania	Tioga	Richmond Township	175.55	282.52	179	US 15 Bus. north / PA 660 west – Canoe Camp, Covington	Southern terminus of US 15 Bus.; eastern terminus of PA 660
Pennsylvania	Tioga	Mansfield	177.82	286.17	182	US 6 – Mansfield, Wellsboro	Access to Hills Creek State Park and Mansfield University
Pennsylvania	Tioga	Richmond Township	179.16	288.33	183	US 15 Bus. south (Main Street)	Southbound exit and northbound entrance; northern terminus of US 15 Bus.
Pennsylvania	Tioga	Tioga Township	187.65	301.99	191	PA 287 – Tioga, Tioga Junction	
Pennsylvania	Tioga	Lawrence Township	192.46	309.73	196	PA 49 – Elkland, Lawrenceville	Access to Cowanesque Lake
			194.89 0.00	313.65 0.00	Pennsylvania–New York state line		
New York	Steuben	Lindley	6.36	10.24	6	CR 5 – Presho	
New York	Steuben	Erwin	8.16	13.13	8	NY 417 – Erwin, Addison	
New York	Steuben	Erwin	11.12	17.90	11	NY 417 – Gang Mills	
New York	Steuben	Erwin	11.69	18.81	12	Robert Dann Drive (CR 107)	No northbound exit
New York	Steuben	Erwin	12.10	19.47	12	I-86 west / NY 17 west (Southern Tier Expressway) – Jamestown, Rochester	Northbound exit and southbound entrance; exit 44 on I-86
New York	Steuben	Erwin			13B	NY 352 east / NY 415 – Riverside, Downtown Corning	Northbound exit only; NY 415 not signed; western terminus of NY 352
New York	Steuben	Erwin	12.68	20.41	13A	I-86 east / NY 17 east (Southern Tier Expressway) – Binghamton, Corning US 15 ends	Northern terminus; northern terminus of US 15
1.000 mi = 1.609 km; 1.000 km = 0.621 mi: Concurrency terminus; Incomplete access
