= New York State Route 4 =

New York State Route 4 may refer to:

- New York State Route 4 (1924–1927) in the Finger Lakes region
- U.S. Route 4 in New York, the only route numbered "4" in New York since 1926
