= New York State Route 417 =

East-west state highway in New York, US

New York State Route 417
- Map of the Southern Tier with NY 417 highlighted in red and NY 951T in blue (abandoned section in light blue)

Route information
- Maintained by NYSDOT, Allegany Indian Reservation, thow town of Erwin, the cities of Olean and Salamanca, and the village of Painted Post
- Length: 105.25 mi (169.38 km)
- Existed: January 1, 1970–present

Major junctions
- West end: I-86 / NY 17 / Southern Tier Expressway in Salamanca
- NY 16 in Olean; NY 19 in Wellsville; NY 36 in Jasper; I-99 / US 15 in Erwin
- East end: NY 415 in Painted Post

Location
- Country: United States
- State: New York
- Counties: Cattaraugus, Allegany, Steuben

Highway system
- New York Highways; Interstate; US; State; Reference; Parkways
| ← NY 416 | → NY 418 |

New York State Route 417 (NY 417) is an east–west state highway located in the Southern Tier of New York in the United States. It begins at exit 20 of the Southern Tier Expressway (Interstate 86 or I-86 and NY 17) in the city of Salamanca and ends at a junction with NY 415 in Painted Post, west of the city of Corning. At 105.25 miles (169.38 km) in length, NY 417 is the longest of the state highways that were formerly part of NY 17 before the construction of the Southern Tier Expressway. It also diverges the most from the current NY 17, coming within 100 feet (30 m) of the Pennsylvania state line at one intersection.

In 1908, the New York State Legislature created Route 4, an unsigned legislative route extending across the Southern Tier from Lake Erie to the Hudson River. The route followed most of what is now NY 417; however, from Olean to Wellsville and from Andover to Jasper, it followed a more northerly alignment instead. Most of Route 4 became NY 17 in 1924, and NY 17 was realigned in 1930 to follow all of modern NY 417 between Salamanca and Corning. The highway remained part of NY 17 until the 1960s and 1970s, when NY 17 was moved onto the Southern Tier Expressway as sections of the new freeway opened to traffic.

On January 1, 1970, NY 417 was assigned to NY 17's former routing between Steamburg and Salamanca. This section was closed to traffic soon afterward, but NY 417 was subsequently reassigned to NY 17's old alignment between Allegany and Corning. The remainder of the expressway between Salamanca and Allegany was completed by the early 1990s, and NY 417 was extended west to cover the highway vacated by NY 17. On its east end, NY 417 originally overlapped with US 15 to meet NY 17 in Painted Post. It was altered in 1997 to directly serve Gang Mills via Hamilton Street and extended into Painted Post in 2008.

== Route description ==
All of NY 417 in Allegany County is maintained by the New York State Department of Transportation (NYSDOT). In Cattaraugus County, maintenance of the route is split between NYSDOT, The Allegany Indian Reservation, and the cities of Olean and Salamanca. All of NY 417 within Olean is city-maintained, save for one block of East State Street between NY 16 and Barry Street. To the west in Salamanca, the route is locally maintained from Merden Street to the eastern city line. The Allegany Indian Reservation maintains the portion of NY 417 that lies outside of the Salamanca city limits but within the reservation. In Steuben County, NY 417 is state maintained from the county line to the I-99/US 15 exit 11 ramps, where it becomes maintained by the town of Erwin from there until the Painted Post village line, where it becomes maintained by the village.

=== Cattaraugus County ===
NY 417 begins at the Seneca Allegany Casino, just south of the exit 20 interchange with the Southern Tier Expressway (I-86 and NY 17) in Salamanca, a city wholly located within the Allegany Indian Reservation. After merging with R. C. Hoag Drive (Old Route 17), the highway heads east as Broad Street, crossing through the city's business district and intersecting the south end of NY 353 and paralleling the Allegheny River as it passes through the mostly residential central portion of the city. NY 417 changes names to Clinton Street after crossing Main Street, and subsequently intersects U.S. Route 219 (US 219) eight blocks later at Parkway Drive (exit 21 of I-86). US 219 joins NY 417 here, and the two routes head northeast across a long bridge carrying Clinton Street across the Allegheny River. On the north bank, Clinton Street merges with Wildwood Avenue, at which point US 219 and NY 417 join the latter for five blocks to a junction with Central Avenue. US 219 leaves NY 417 here, following Central Avenue out of the city while NY 417 continues east as part of US 219 Business.

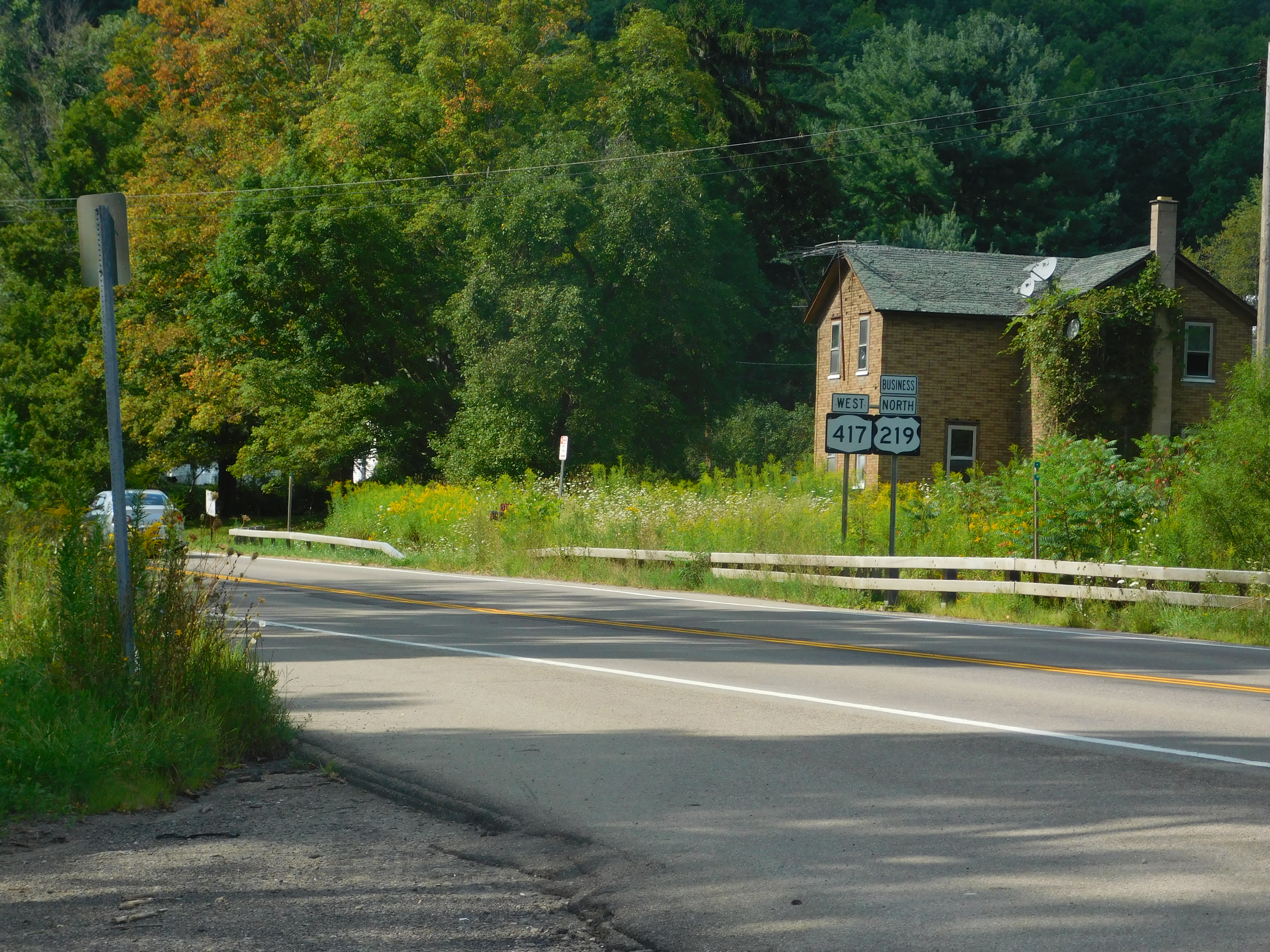
NY 417 westbound with US 219 Business in Carollton

Not far to the east of US 219, US 219 Business and NY 417 leave Salamanca upon crossing over Great Valley Creek, which serves as the boundary between Salamanca and the hamlet of Kill Buck. The concurrency continues eastward through Kill Buck and into reservation land within the bounds of Great Valley, transitioning to forests and otherwise undeveloped areas as the highway turns south to follow the eastern edge of the Allegheny River valley. The river, the valley, and the road all turn back to the east in the adjacent town of Carrollton, where US 219 Business leaves NY 417 to continue south toward I-86 exit 23 and on to Limestone and Bradford, Pennsylvania. NY 417 continues to follow the Allegheny River and the nearby Southern Tier Expressway (STE) to the hamlet of Vandalia, the easternmost point of the reservation. Continuing into the town of Allegany, NY 417 indirectly intersects with I-86 and NY 17 at exist 24. From there, it passes through the village of Allegany and serves the campus of St. Bonaventure University before entering the city of Olean, the largest community along its length.

In Olean, NY 417 initially follows State Street across a heavily commercialized area before entering a more residential portion of the city. It continues to run past a handful of smaller businesses to Olean's downtown district, where it meets NY 16 at Union Street. East of here, NY 417 diverges from the STE as it crosses over Olean Creek and follows the Allegheny River into the slightly less populated town of Portville. The route continues for about 5 miles (8.0 km) to the village of Portville, the site of a brief concurrency with NY 305. NY 417's southeast heading continues east of the small village, taking the road away from the river and into Allegany County.

=== Allegany County ===
The first 2 miles (3.2 km) of NY 417 in Allegany County traverses isolated, undeveloped areas as it runs along the base of a large valley surrounding Oswayo Creek, a tributary of the Allegheny River. It continues to the small hamlet of Ceres, where NY 417 skirts the Pennsylvania state line closely enough to serve as the de facto northern end of Pennsylvania Route 44, which officially begins about 100 feet (30 m) to the south of the junction. From Ceres, it turns to the northeast, utilizing a smaller valley formed by the Little Genesee Creek, itself a branch of Oswayo Creek. The 7-mile (11 km) valley leads NY 417 to the village of Bolivar, where NY 275 begins at NY 417 in the village center and heads north toward Friendship.

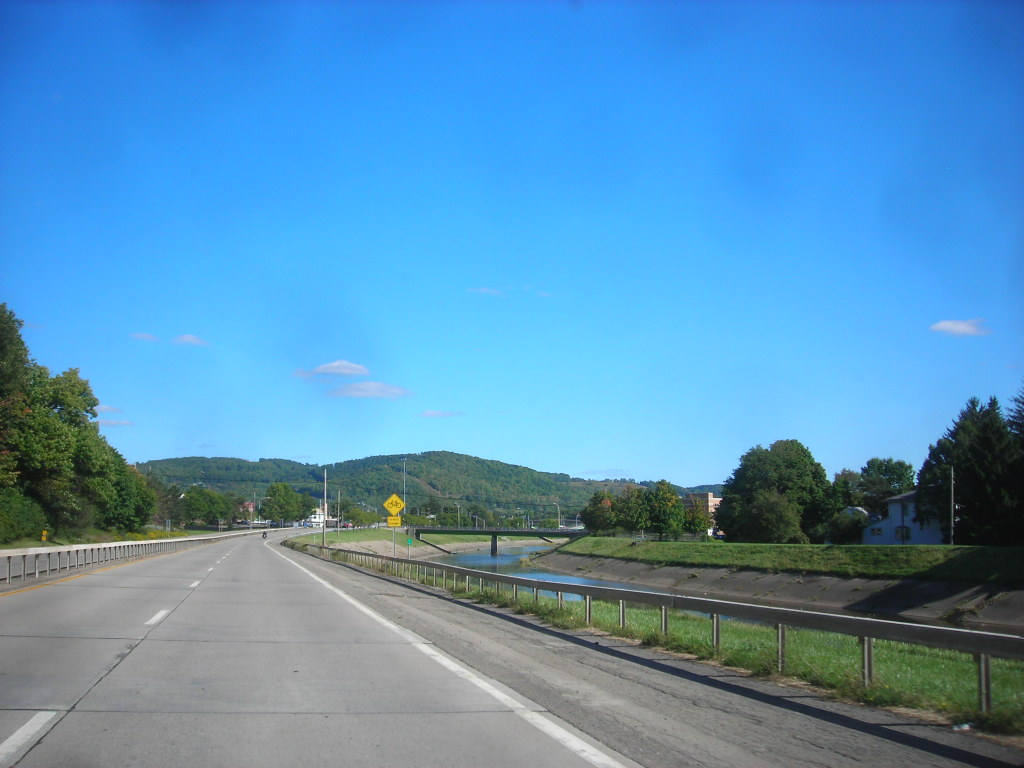
Southbound on the divided highway carrying NY 19 and NY 417 around Wellsville

NY 417, meanwhile, leaves Bolivar to the east, winding its way northeastward across the mountains of the Southern Tier to its next large community, the village of Wellsville. The route enters the community, located in the Genesee River valley, from the west on Bolivar Road. It runs across the northwestern part of Wellsville and crosses the Genesee River before meeting NY 19 at a junction northwest of the village's center. NY 417 turns south here, following NY 19 along a four-lane divided highway that runs along the Genesee River and bypasses much of the village's central business district. The highway and the overlap both end just southeast of downtown Wellsville, at which point NY 417 continues northeastward through the residential eastern section of the village on Andover Road.

About 2 miles (3.2 km) from the village center, the development along NY 417 ceases as the route progresses generally northeastward through the narrow valley of Dyke Creek, closely paralleling the main line of the Western New York and Pennsylvania Railroad (WNYP). After another 7 miles (11 km), NY 417 comes to the village of Andover, where NY 21 begins its long trip north toward the Finger Lakes. The WNYP also heads north here to follow NY 21 to the city of Hornell; however, NY 417 continues east along Dyer Creek for another 2 miles (3.2 km) to the Steuben County line.

=== Steuben County ===
In Steuben County, NY 417 begins to climb the headwall of the Dyer Creek valley, reaching an elevation of 2,300 feet (701 m) above sea level at the Greenwood hamlet of West Greenwood. The route descends into a ravine known as Cole Hollow shortly afterward, where it intersects NY 248 north of the hamlet of Greenwood. Past NY 248, the route winds its way through Woodward Hollow to the town of Jasper and a junction with NY 36, another major north–south route, at a junction west of the hamlet of Jasper. NY 36 overlaps with NY 417 to the outskirts of the community, at which point it splits from NY 417 and heads toward Hornell. NY 417, meanwhile continues southeast through Jasper and follows Tuscarora Creek toward Woodhull.

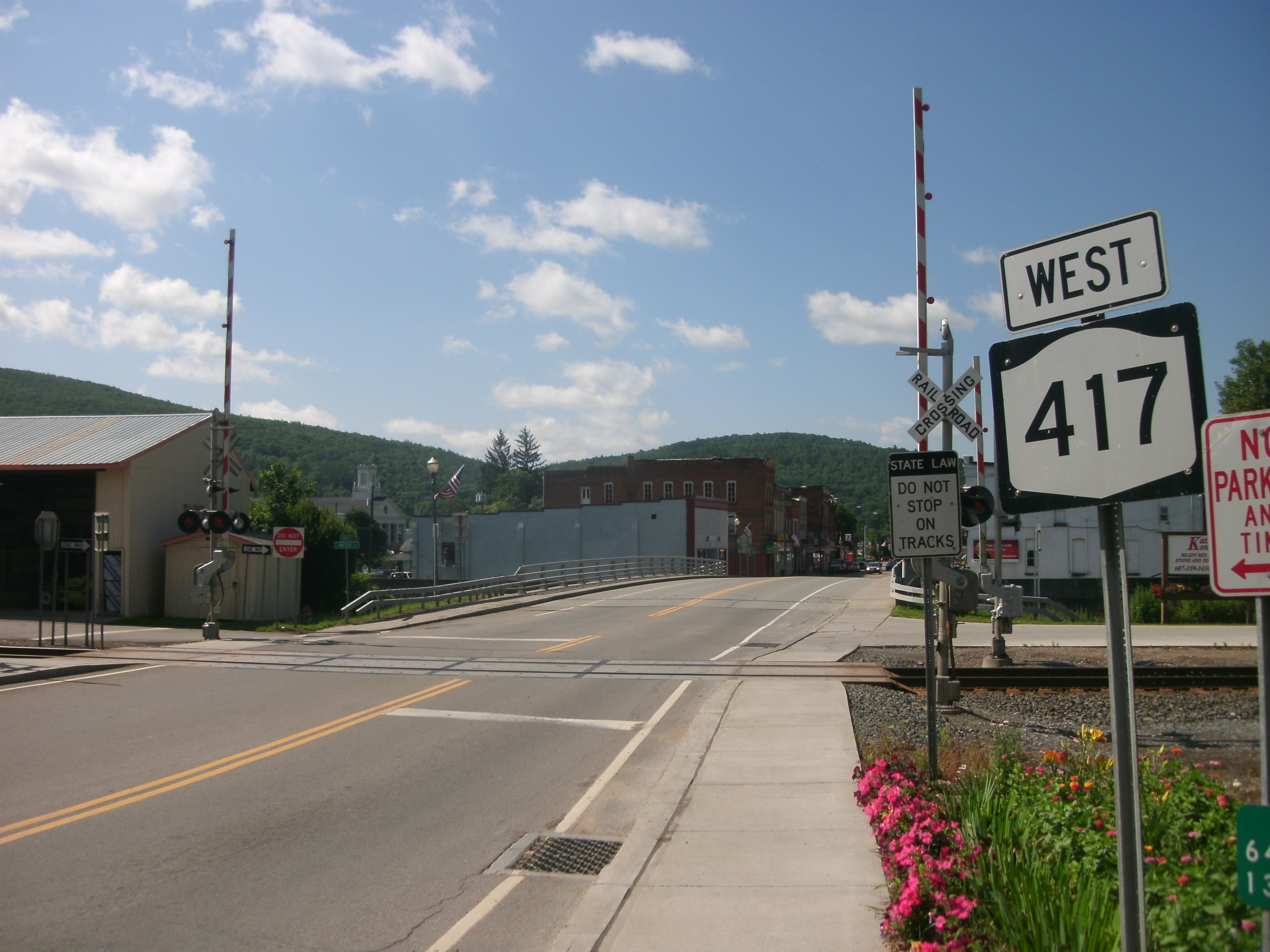
NY 417 westbound approaching downtown in the village of Addison

Beyond Jasper, the road meanders through a valley surrounding Tuscarora Creek, heading generally eastward to a larger gully containing the Canisteo River and the village of Addison. Just north of the village center, the route crosses over the river and intersects Front Street, which once carried NY 17F and later NY 432 into the village. Outside of Addison, NY 417 follows the Canisteo River and the Norfolk Southern Railway's Southern Tier Line into the adjacent town of Erwin, where it connects to I-99 and US 15 at an interchange northwest of the confluence of the Canisteo and Tioga Rivers. At this point, the railroad and NY 417 turn northeast to follow I-99/US 15 and the Tioga River into the hamlet of Gang Mills, a western suburb of Corning.

In Gang Mills, NY 417 crosses the Southern Tier Line on an overpass and connects to I-99/US 15 twice: once in the community itself and again northeast of Gang Mills at Robert Dann Drive. The route continues past Robert Dann Drive on South Hamilton Street, crossing over the Cohocton River and reconnecting to the Southern Tier Expressway at exit 44, a complex semi-directional T interchange that also connects I-86 and NY 17 to I-99 and US 15. From here, the route proceeds into the village of Painted Post as North Hamilton Street, serving two blocks of mostly commercial properties before terminating at an intersection with NY 415.

== History ==
Three sections of modern NY 417 were designated as part of Route 4, an unsigned legislative route, by the New York State Legislature in 1908. Route 4, a cross-state highway that began near Lake Erie in Chautauqua County and ended near the Hudson River in Orange County, proceeded east from Salamanca to Corning via Olean, Hinsdale, Belvidere, Wellsville, Andover, Hornell, Jasper, and Addison. Much of legislative Route 4 west of Harriman—including all of the route between Salamanca and Corning—was designated as part of NY 17 when the first set of posted routes in New York were assigned in 1924. NY 17 was realigned in the 1930 renumbering of state highways in New York to follow more southerly alignments from Olean to Wellsville (via Ceres) and from Andover to Jasper (via Greenwood). As a result, NY 17 now followed the length of current NY 417 between Salamanca and Corning.

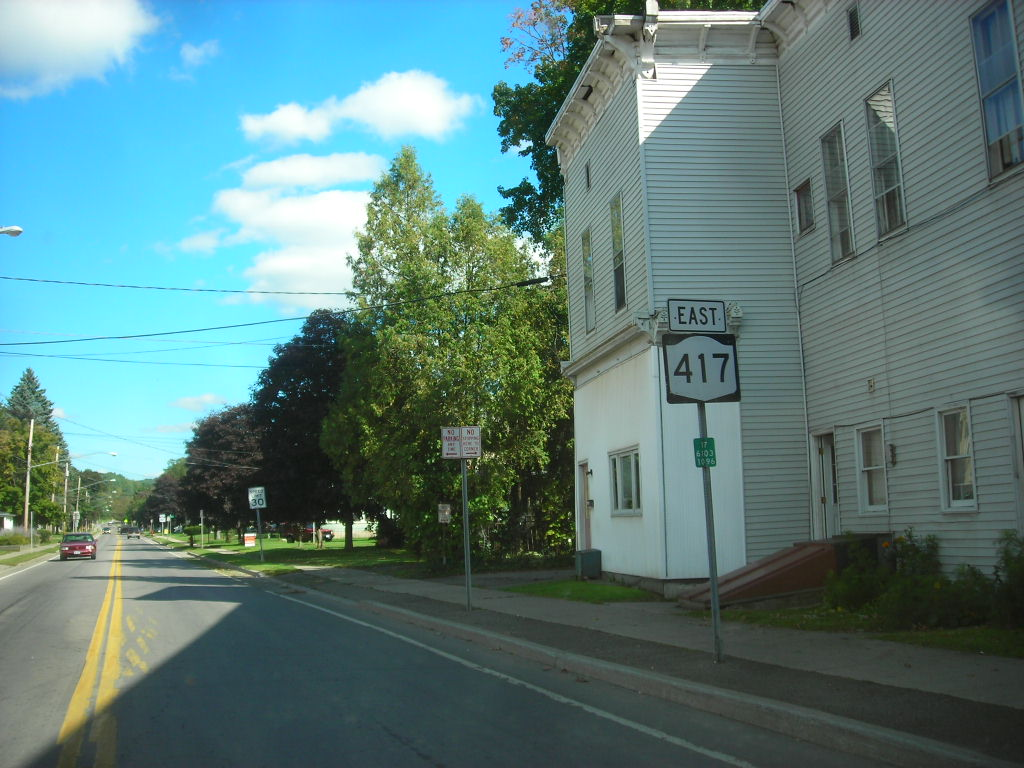
Reference and reassurance markers on NY 417 eastbound in Bolivar. The reference marker's top row reads "17" for NY 17, NY 417's original designation.

As sections of the Southern Tier Expressway (STE) were completed, NY 17 was moved onto the expressway and NY 417 was assigned to sections of NY 17's former surface routing, beginning with the piece between Steamburg and Salamanca on January 1, 1970. Ironically, that first section was the first to be deleted entirely when part of the route through the Allegany Indian Reservation was closed to traffic in the early 1970s. Around the same time, NY 17 was relocated onto the mostly completed Southern Tier Expressway between Allegany and Corning, allowing the NY 417 designation to be transferred to NY 17's former alignment between the two locations. A second section—from exit 20 on the STE to US 219 in Salamanca—was added to NY 417 in the early 1980s following the completion of the STE between exits 20 and 21. The two segments were linked in the early 1990s following the completion of the expressway in the vicinity of Salamanca.

Originally, NY 417 extended into Painted Post by way of a concurrency with US 15. NY 417 joined the freeway in Erwin (exit 2) and followed it north to exit 44 of the STE, where both NY 417 and US 15 ended. The overlap was eliminated sometime after 1989. On April 1, 1997, ownership and maintenance of Hamilton Street from the east end of NY 417 at US 15 exit 2 to US 15 exit 4 in Gang Mills was transferred from the town of Erwin to the state of New York as part of a highway maintenance swap between Erwin, the state, and Steuben County. The new state highway, part of US 15 and NY 17 prior to the construction of the US 15 freeway, became an extension of NY 417. In 2008, NY 417 was extended again to a new terminus at NY 415 in Painted Post following the completion of the I-86 / US 15 interchange reconstruction project. This section of NY 417 also follows part of NY 17's pre-freeway alignment.

Example of a reference marker used on NY 951T

The portion of former NY 417 from Steamburg to Salamanca is now designated as NY 951T, an unsigned reference route. Although the physical roadway remains continuous, part of it is closed to traffic. Ostensibly, this was due to the potential for the Allegheny Reservoir to flood and inundate part of the roadway; the closure may have also partially been invoked to discourage tourists from browsing the newly built Seneca resettlement area (Jimerson Town) that had been constructed around the road. This stretch was abandoned in 1980 and left unattended by both the state and local governments, leading to the rapid deterioration of the roadway, including a bridge running over the reservoir (constructed in 1930) that remains standing but has since become a hazard. Due to this situation, NY 951T exists in two segments: a 0.47-mile (0.76 km) western portion extending east from NY 394 in Coldspring and a 3.55-mile (5.71 km) eastern portion that originates at NY 417 in Salamanca and continues west to Breed Run Road. The Seneca Nation Allegany reservation governmental headquarters, along with the surrounding hamlet of Jimerson Town, lies on the eastern half of NY 951T. The Seneca Nation and the state of New York began talks in March 2010 to rebuild the former NY 417 between Steamburg and Jimerson Town. At the time, the cost was estimated to be $15 million. Discussions were revived again in April 2012 after the death of a woman attempting to cross the bridge with her husband. In April 2014, the state announced that it was indeed planning a project to replace the bridge and reopen the roadway. Emergency work on the route between Breed Run and the former NY 382 began in August 2014 in an effort to make the road passable after a portion of NY 951T washed out. Replacement of the bridge and much of the closed roadway began in December 2023.

== Major intersections ==
| County | Location | mi | km | Destinations | Notes |
|---|---|---|---|---|---|
| Cattaraugus | City of Salamanca | 0.00 | 0.00 | I-86 / NY 17 / Southern Tier Expressway – Jamestown, Binghamton | Western terminus; exit 20 (I-86 / NY 17) |
| Cattaraugus | City of Salamanca | 0.75 | 1.21 | RC Hoag Drive (NY 951T west) | Formerly part of NY 17; eastern terminus of unsigned NY 951T |
| Cattaraugus | City of Salamanca | 1.05 | 1.69 | NY 353 north (Center Street) | Southern terminus of NY 353 |
| Cattaraugus | City of Salamanca | 2.60 | 4.18 | I-86 / NY 17 / Southern Tier Expressway / US 219 south (Parkway Drive) – Allegany State Park | Western terminus of US 219 / NY 417 overlap |
| Cattaraugus | City of Salamanca | 3.33 | 5.36 | US 219 north (Central Avenue) – Ellicottville, Buffalo US 219 Bus. begins | Eastern terminus of US 219 / NY 417 overlap; western terminus of US 219 Bus. / NY 417 overlap |
| Cattaraugus | Carrollton | 9.72 | 15.64 | US 219 Bus. south to I-86 / NY 17 / Southern Tier Expressway / US 219 – Limestone, Bradford, PA | Eastern terminus of US 219 Bus. / NY 417 overlap |
| Cattaraugus | Town of Allegany | 16.17 | 26.02 | To I-86 / NY 17 / Southern Tier Expressway – Binghamton, Olean | Access via West Five Mile Road |
| Cattaraugus | City of Olean | 20.86 | 33.57 | NY 16 (Union Street) | |
| Cattaraugus | Village of Portville | 26.66 | 42.91 | NY 305 north (Brooklyn Street) – Cuba | Northern terminus of NY 305 / NY 417 overlap |
| Cattaraugus | Town of Portville | 27.44 | 44.16 | NY 305 south (Portville Eldred Road) – Eldred, PA | Southern terminus of NY 305 / NY 417 overlap |
| Allegany | Genesee | 31.52 | 50.73 | PA 44 south – Coudersport | Hamlet of Ceres; northern terminus of PA 44 |
| Allegany | Village of Bolivar | 38.87 | 62.56 | NY 275 north (Main Street) | Southern terminus of NY 275 |
| Allegany | Village of Wellsville | 51.42 | 82.75 | NY 19 north (North Main Street) – Belmont | Western terminus of NY 19 / NY 417 overlap |
| Allegany | Village of Wellsville | 52.88 | 85.10 | NY 19 south (South Main Street) – Stannards | Eastern terminus of NY 19 / NY 417 overlap |
| Allegany | Village of Andover | 61.26 | 98.59 | NY 21 north (Main Street) – Alfred Station | Southern terminus of NY 21 |
| Steuben | Greenwood | 69.89 | 112.48 | NY 248 – Canisteo, Greenwood | |
| Steuben | Jasper | 77.23 | 124.29 | NY 36 south (Main Street) – Troupsburg | Western terminus of NY 36 / NY 417 overlap |
| Steuben | Jasper | 78.45 | 126.25 | NY 36 north – Canisteo | Eastern terminus of NY 36 / NY 417 overlap; hamlet of Jasper |
| Steuben | Village of Addison | 95.67 | 153.97 | CR 119 west (West Front Street) – Rathbone, Cameron | Former eastern terminus of NY 432 |
| Steuben | Erwin | 100.36 | 161.51 | I-99 / US 15 – Corning, Mansfield | Hamlet of Erwins; exit 8 (I-99 / US 15) |
| Steuben | Erwin | 103.26 | 166.18 | I-99 / US 15 | Hamlet of Gang Mills; exit 11 (I-99 / US 15) |
| Steuben | Erwin | 104.26 | 167.79 | I-99 south / US 15 south / Robert Dann Drive | Exit 12 (I-99 / US 15) |
| Steuben | Erwin | 104.94 | 168.88 | I-86 / NY 17 / Southern Tier Expressway | Exit 44 (I-86 / NY 17) |
| Steuben | Painted Post | 105.25 | 169.38 | NY 415 (High Street) to I-86 / NY 17 / Southern Tier Expressway | Eastern terminus |
1.000 mi = 1.609 km; 1.000 km = 0.621 mi: Concurrency terminus
