= Cessna, Pennsylvania =

Unincorporated community in Pennsylvania, US

Coordinates: 40°05′40″N 78°31′32″W

Cessna is a populated place in Bedford County, Pennsylvania, United States, located within Bedford Township. Its elevation is at 1,102 feet above sea level. It is at the confluence of Interstate 99 and Pennsylvania Route 56.

The community was named after John A. Cessna, who was credited with bringing the railroad to the community.

The place is notable for being the birthplace of John Cessna.
