= Erwin, New York =

- Town
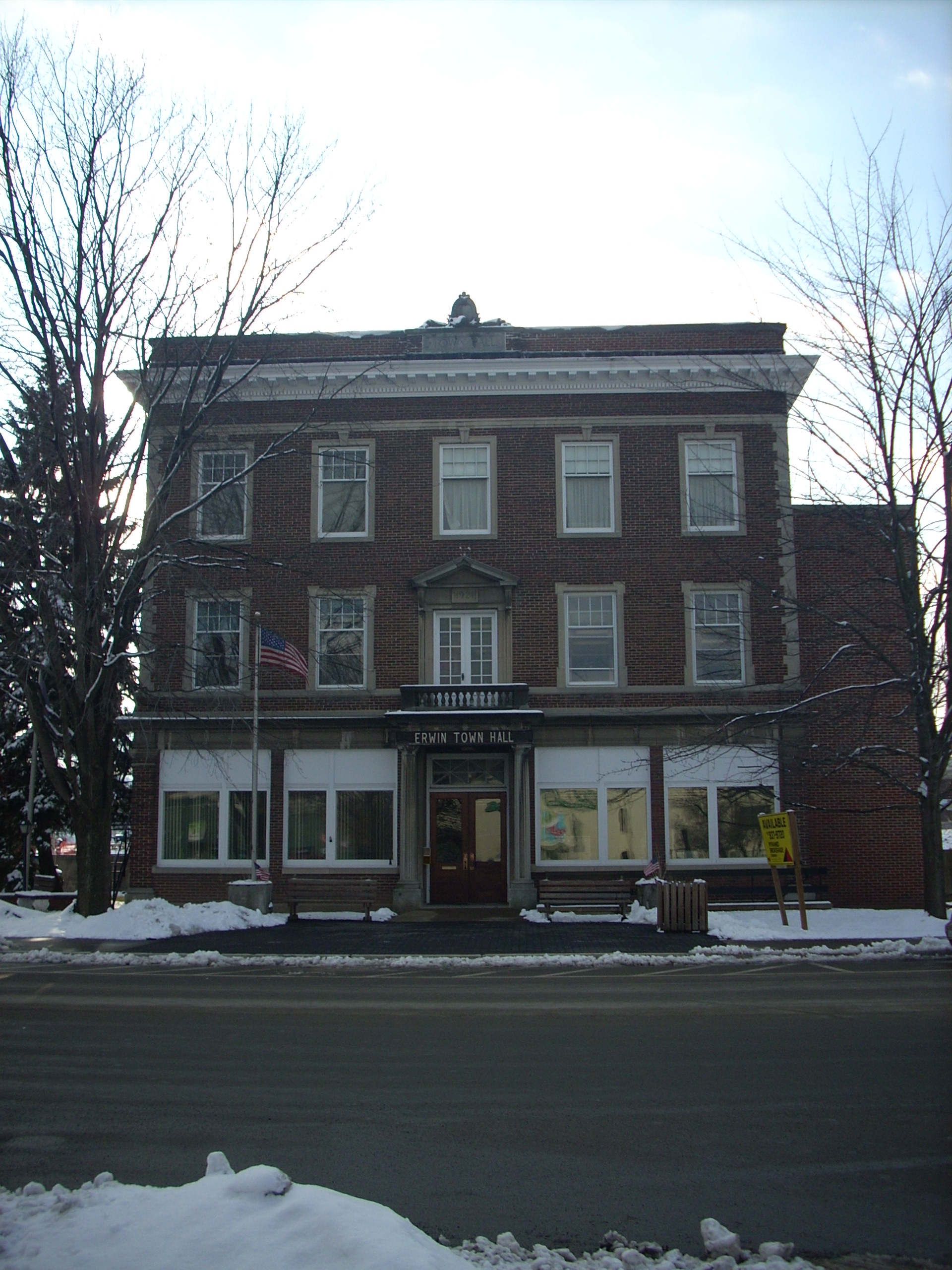
- The Erwin town hall in Painted Post

- Location within New York Location within the United States
- Coordinates: 42°8′59″N 77°7′20″W
- Country: United States
- State: New York
- County: Steuben

Area
  - Total: 39.16 sq mi (101.42 km^{2})
  - Land: 38.66 sq mi (100.12 km^{2})
  - Water: 0.50 sq mi (1.30 km^{2})
- Elevation: 1,020 ft (310 m)

Population (2020)
  - Total: 8,090 ▲
  - Estimate (2024): 7,860
  - Density: 217/sq mi (83.6/km^{2})
- Time zone: UTC-5 (Eastern (EST))
  - Summer (DST): UTC-4 (EDT)
- FIPS code: 36-24647
- GNIS feature ID: 0978943
- Website: www.erwinny.gov

Erwin is a town in Steuben County, New York, United States. The population was 8,090 at the 2020 census. The name is that of an early settler, who became the first Town Supervisor. Erwin is in the southeast part of the county and is west of the city of Corning.

== History ==
The first permanent settlement came around 1786, and "Erwin" was listed in the first census of the United States in 1790. The town of Erwin was formed from the former "Town of Painted Post" (now the town of Corning) in 1826. Erwin was reduced to form the town of Lindley (1837), but was increased by a part of the town of Corning in 1856.

The "painted post" was a wooden post discovered in the south part of Steuben County. Its purpose and origin remain controversial.

== Geography ==
According to the United States Census Bureau, the town has a total area of 39.2 square miles (102 km^{2}), of which, 38.7 square miles (100 km^{2}) of it is land and 0.5 square miles (1.3 km^{2}) of it (1.17%) is water.

Interstate 99/U.S. Route 15, New York State Route 414, New York State Route 417 and Interstate 86 (Southern Tier Expressway) pass through the town.

The Tioga River merges with the Cohocton River near Painted Post to form the Chemung River which flows to the east. The Canisteo River flows into the Tioga River near Erwins village.

== Demographics ==
Historical population
Census	Pop.	Note	%±
1830	795		—
1840	785		−1.3%
1850	1,435		82.8%
1860	1,859		29.5%
1870	1,977		6.3%
1880	2,005		1.4%
1890	1,884		−6.0%
1900	1,851		−1.8%
1910	2,211		19.4%
1920	3,086		39.6%
1930	3,518		14.0%
1940	3,716		5.6%
1950	4,393		18.2%
1960	5,829		32.7%
1970	6,275		7.7%
1980	6,445		2.7%
1990	6,763		4.9%
2000	7,227		6.9%
2010	8,037		11.2%
2020	8,090		0.7%
2024 (est.)	7,860		−2.8%
U.S. Decennial Census

As of the census of 2000, there were 7,227 people, 2,977 households, and 1,949 families residing in the town. The population density was 186.8 inhabitants per square mile (72.1/km^{2}). There were 3,196 housing units at an average density of 82.6 per square mile (31.9/km^{2}). The racial makeup of the town was 92.13% White, 2.24% African American, 0.18% Native American, 4.59% Asian, 0.12% from other races, and 0.73% from two or more races. Hispanic or Latino of any race were 1.30% of the population.

There were 2,977 households, out of which 31.4% had children under the age of 18 living with them, 53.4% were married couples living together, 8.7% had a female householder with no husband present, and 34.5% were non-families. 30.6% of all households were made up of individuals, and 16.0% had someone living alone who was 65 years of age or older. The average household size was 2.38 and the average family size was 2.98.

In the town, the population was spread out, with 24.9% under the age of 18, 5.7% from 18 to 24, 26.7% from 25 to 44, 24.4% from 45 to 64, and 18.4% who were 65 years of age or older. The median age was 41 years. For every 100 females, there were 90.3 males. For every 100 females age 18 and over, there were 84.8 males.

The median income for a household in the town was $44,386, and the median income for a family was $57,169. Males had a median income of $44,155 versus $28,795 for females. The per capita income for the town was $27,192. About 5.1% of families and 6.7% of the population were below the poverty line, including 8.8% of those under age 18 and 3.3% of those age 65 or over.

== Communities and locations in the Town of Erwin ==
- Coopers Plains – A hamlet in the northern part of the town.
- Corning-Painted Post Airport (7N1) A small airport west of Painted Post.
- Erwin Wildlife Management Area – A conservation area in the northwest part of the town.
- Erwins – A hamlet in the eastern part of the town on NY-417.
- Gang Mills – A hamlet southwest of the city of Corning on US Route 15.
- Painted Post – The village of Painted Post on NY-415.

== See also ==
- List of towns in New York (state)
