= U.S. Route 15 in New York =

Segment of American highway

U.S. Route 15
- Map of New York state with US 15 highlighted in red

Route information
- Length: 12.68 mi (20.41 km)
- Existed: April 1939–present

Major junctions
- South end: I-99 / US 15 at the Pennsylvania state line in Lawrenceville, PA
- North end: I-86 / I-99 / NY 17 / NY 352 near Painted Post

Location
- Country: United States
- State: New York
- Counties: Steuben

Highway system
- New York Highways; Interstate; US; State; Reference; Parkways
← NY 14A	→ NY 15
← NY 98	I-99	→ NY 100

U.S. Route 15 (US 15) is a part of the United States Numbered Highway System that runs from Walterboro, South Carolina, to Painted Post, New York. In the U.S. state of New York, US 15 extends 12.68 miles (20.41 km) through the Southern Tier from the Pennsylvania state line at Lindley north to an interchange with the Southern Tier Expressway (I-86/NY 17) just outside Painted Post. US 15 originally continued north to Rochester before being truncated to its present northern terminus. All of US 15 in New York was designated as Interstate 99 (I-99) on June 27, 2014, and US 15 now runs concurrently with I-99.

== Route description ==
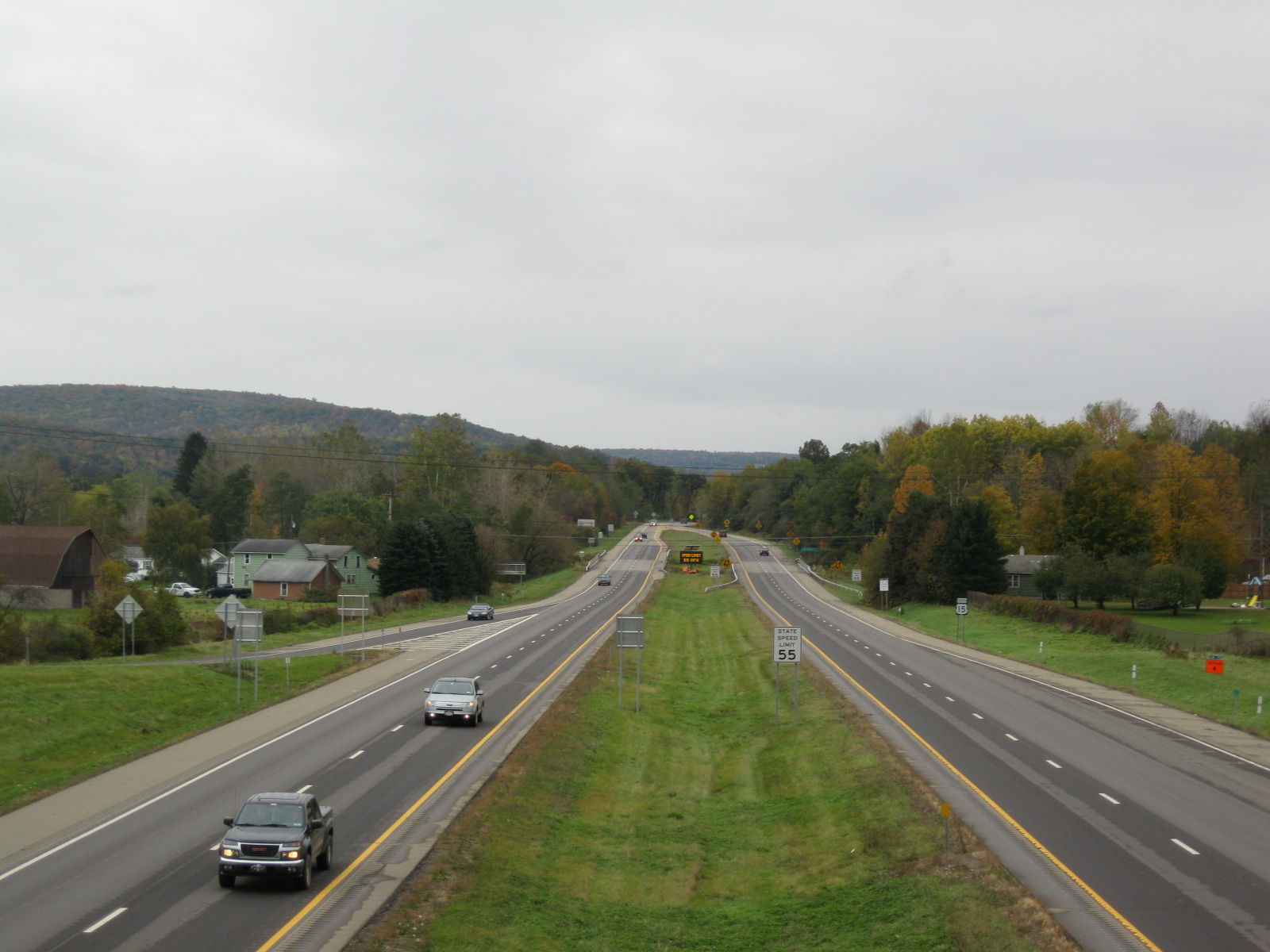
Looking southward along US 15 from the Smith Road overpass in Presho prior to the road's completion. The highway previously narrowed from four to two lanes in the background.

I-99/US 15 enters New York adjacent to the state line, borough of Lawrenceville, Pennsylvania. A four-lane freeway through the Steuben County town of Lindley, I-99/US 15 crosses through a rock cut, making a large bend to the north and bypassing the hamlet of Presho. I-99/US 15 enters a partial cloverleaf interchange with County Route 5 (CR 5; Smith Road). After CR 5, I-99/US 15 bends northeast through the town of Erwin, running to the west of the Indian Hills Golf Club. Making a gradual bend further to the northeast, the freeway crosses the Canisteo River and enters the hamlet of Erwin, where it enters a diamond interchange with NY 417 (Addison Road). After NY 417, I-99/US 15 makes a bend alongside Norfolk Southern Railroad's Southern Tier Line (former Erie Railroad main line). Now paralleling the tracks and NY 417, I-99/US 15 crosses through Erwin, entering exit 3, which connects to NY 417 once again, next to Gang Mills Yard, the site of the former Painted Post station.

After Gang Mills Yard, I-99/US 15 crosses through the Gang Mills section of Erwin, entering a large interchange at the northern end of the neighborhood. Signed exit 12, this interchange serves CR 107 (Robert Dann Drive) via NY 417. After CR 107, I-99/US 15 enters a large interchange that utilizes several flyover ramps between I-99/US 15, I-86, and NY 17 (Southern Tier Expressway). Ramps are also present, connecting to NY 352. This interchange serves as the northern terminus of I-99/US 15.

== History ==
=== Origins and designation ===
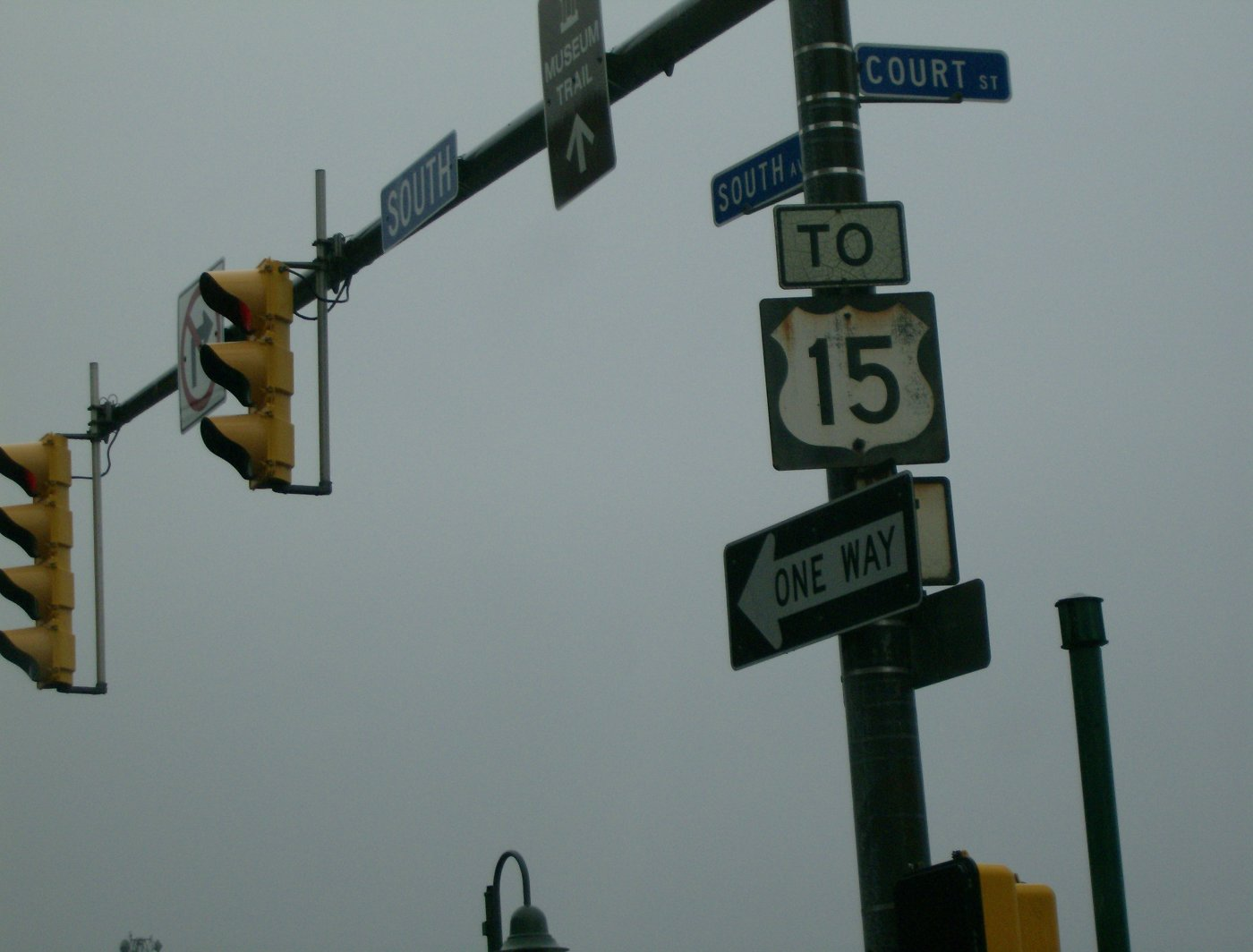
Authentic US 15 shield at the former northern terminus in Rochester.

The first set of posted routes in New York was assigned in 1924. One route assigned at this time was New York State Route 4 (NY 4), a highway extending from the Pennsylvania state line in Lindley to downtown Rochester. NY 4 roughly followed the modern alignment of US 15 from Pennsylvania to Presho, Indian Hill Road from Presho to Erwin, NY 417 from Erwin to Gang Mills, and Hamilton Street from Gang Mills to Painted Post. From Painted Post northward, NY 4 was routed along modern NY 415 to Wayland, from where it continued to Rochester on what is now NY 15. At the state line, NY 4 connected to Pennsylvania Route 4 (PA 4). In 1927, US 4 was first signed in New York. As a result, NY 4 was renumbered to New York State Route 2 (NY 2) to eliminate numerical duplication with the new U.S. Highway.

By 1929, US 111 was assigned, following what had been PA 4 northward from Williamsport, Pennsylvania, to the New York state line at Lawrenceville, where it ended. At some point between 1935 and 1937, US 15 was extended northward from Harrisburg, Pennsylvania, to the New York state line by way of an overlap with US 111. The overlap between US 15 and US 111 was eliminated c. 1938 when US 111 was truncated southward to Harrisburg. US 15 was extended northward to Rochester by the following April, replacing all of NY 2.

=== Realignments and truncation ===
Construction began c. 1962 on a bypass of NY 17 and US 15 in the vicinity of Corning (modern exit 45) and Painted Post (exit 43). The entirety of the highway, plus an extension northwest to Campbell (exit 41), was completed between 1964 and 1968. US 15 and NY 17 were rerouted to follow the new highway, and their former routings between Campbell and Corning were redesignated as NY 415. The portion of the US 15/NY 17 freeway between Campbell and Avoca (exit 36) was completed by 1973. On July 1, 1974, US 15 was truncated to its current northern terminus in Painted Post and replaced with NY 15 from Painted Post to Rochester.

In the mid-1960s, work began on a limited-access highway paralleling US 15 from Presho to the Southern Tier Expressway at Painted Post. The highway was completed and opened to traffic c. 1969 as a realignment of US 15. The interchange between US 15 and NY 17 (now concurrent with I-86) in Painted Post has been redesigned twice. The original configuration of the interchange featured a loop centered around the point where US 15 met NY 17, with ramps providing access to and from the loop from US 15, NY 17, and North Hamilton Street. The second design, in place until 2003, was a semi-diamond interchange, with US 15 intersecting ramps from I-86 and NY 17 at-grade. One connection, I-86/NY 17 east to North Hamilton Street, was lost in this version due to the ramp setup of the southern half of the interchange. North of the ramps leading to and from I-86/NY 17 westbound, the right-of-way of US 15 continued north into Painted Post as North Hamilton Street. The current setup is a directional T interchange, which creates a freeway-to-freeway connection between US 15 and I-86/NY 17. Separate ramps for North Hamilton Street from I-86/NY 17 were retained; however, for the first time, there was no direct connection between US 15 and North Hamilton Street. Work on the interchange began in late 2003 and was completed in mid-2008.

=== Conversion to freeway ===
In the National Highway System Designation Act of 1995, the portion of US 15 in New York was defined as part of I-99. I-99 currently ends just shy of I-80; however, construction is either underway or has been completed on projects to upgrade US 220 and US 15 between Bellefonte, Pennsylvania, and Corning to Interstate Highway standards. In June 2007, work began on a new freeway alignment for US 15 between the Pennsylvania state line and Watson Creek Road in Lindley. The highway was opened to traffic on October 1, 2008. Ownership and maintenance of the former surface alignment of US 15 was transferred to Steuben County, which designated the highway as CR 115.

Ground was broken on September 21, 2009, on the final section of the freeway between Watson Creek Road and Presho. The southbound lanes of the highway opened on August 22, 2013. The northbound lanes opened on October 8. The bridge portion of the project received $9 million (equivalent to $12.1 million in 2024) in annual Appalachian Development Highway System (ADHS) funding from 2010 to 2012 and $5.7 million (equivalent to $7.68 million in 2024) from the state of New York. Local officials had called on state and federal officials to expedite the construction process by paying for the project up front and using ADHS grants in the years to come to pay off the debt later on. The highway was nominated for a Transportation Investment Generating Economic Recovery grant but was rejected. On June 27, 2014, Governor Andrew Cuomo announced that US 15 was now designated officially as part of I-99. While signs for US 15 were removed after the designation of I-99, they were restored in 2016, and US 15 and I-99 continue to officially overlap for the entire length of the routes in New York.

== Exit list ==
The entire route is in Steuben County.

Location	mi	km	Old exit	New exit	Destinations	Notes
Lindley	0.00	0.00			I-99 south / US 15 south – Mansfield	Continuation into Pennsylvania
Lindley	6.36	10.24	1	6	CR 5 – Presho	
Erwin	8.16	13.13	2	8	NY 417 – Erwin, Addison	
Erwin	11.12	17.90	3	11	NY 417 – Gang Mills, Painted Post	Hamlet of Gang Mills
Erwin	11.69	18.81		12	Robert Dann Drive (CR 107)	No northbound exit
Erwin	12.10	19.47		12	I-86 west / NY 17 west (Southern Tier Expressway) – Jamestown, Rochester	Northbound exit and southbound entrance; exit 44 on I-86
Erwin			4B	13B	NY 352 east / NY 415 – Riverside, Downtown Corning	Northbound exit only; NY 415 not signed; western terminus of NY 352
Erwin	12.68	20.41	4A	13A	I-86 east / NY 17 east (Southern Tier Expressway) – Binghamton, Corning I-99 ends	Northern terminus; northern terminus of I-99
1.000 mi = 1.609 km; 1.000 km = 0.621 mi: Concurrency terminus; Incomplete access

== See also ==
- List of county routes in Steuben County, New York

U.S. Route 15
Previous state: Pennsylvania	New York	Next state: Terminus
