= U.S. Route 15 =

Highway in the United States

U.S. Route 15
- US 15 highlighted in red

Route information
- Length: 791.71 mi (1,274.13 km)
- Existed: 1926–present

Major junctions
- South end: US 17 Alt. in Walterboro, SC
- I-95 near Santee, SC; I-20 in Bishopville, SC; I-40 in Durham, NC; I-85 in Durham, NC; I-64 in Zion Crossroads, VA; I-66 in Haymarket, VA; I-70 in Frederick, MD; I-76 / Penna Turnpike in Mechanicsburg, PA; I-81 near Harrisburg, PA; I-80 near Milton, PA
- North end: I-86 / I-99 / NY 17 / NY 352 in Painted Post, NY

Location
- Country: United States
- States: South Carolina, North Carolina, Virginia, Maryland, Pennsylvania, New York

Highway system
- United States Numbered Highway System; List; Special; Divided
← US 14	→ US 16

U.S. Route 15 or U.S. Highway 15 (US 15) is a 791.71-mile-long (1,274.13 km) United States Numbered Highway, serving the states of South Carolina, North Carolina, Virginia, Maryland, Pennsylvania, and New York. The route is signed north–south, from US 17 Alternate (US 17 Alt.) in Walterboro, South Carolina, north to Interstate 86 (I-86)/New York State Route 17 (NY 17) in Corning, New York.

US 15 is one of the original U.S. Highways from 1926.

== Route description ==
Lengths
	mi	km
SC	158.58	255.21
NC	158.13	254.49
VA	229.73	369.71
MD	37.92	61.03
PA	194.89	313.65
NY	12.46	20.05
Total	791.71	1,274.13

=== South Carolina ===
Starting at US 17 Alt. in Walterboro, US 15 goes east, running parallel to I-95 and across I-26. Then it turns north and crosses I-95. Just before the town of Santee, US 15 converges with US 301. In Santee, the two highways merge with I-95 at exit 98 and all three cross Lake Marion. At exit 102, US 15/US 301 split off from I-95 and go into the town of Summerton. US 15 then separates from US 301 and heads mainly north to city of Sumter. From there, it continues north, crosses I-20, and goes through the cities of Bishopville and Hartsville to the town of Society Hill. It is here that US 401 joins US 15 and both go to the North Carolina border.

=== North Carolina ===
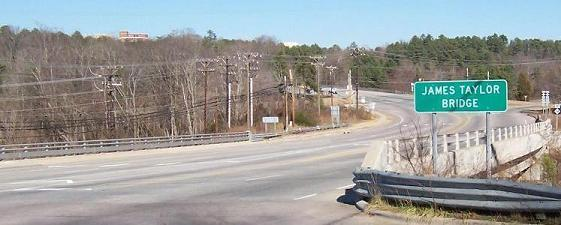
James Taylor Bridge, Chapel Hill, North Carolina, part of the US 15/US 501 route

US 15/US 401 continues to Laurinburg, at which US 401 splits off and US 15 runs concurrent with US 501. US 1 briefly merges with US 15/US 501 through Aberdeen and Sanford. The route continues north of Sanford with North Carolina Highway 87 toward Pittsboro. Past Pittsboro, US 15/US 501 goes toward Chapel Hill and skirts around the southeastern edge of the city and then across I-40 to Durham. (Prior to the construction of the Chapel Hill bypass, US 15 ran through Chapel Hill, and, as of 2018, there is a "Jefferson Davis Highway" marker on Franklin Street, Chapel Hill's main street.) Here, US 15 Business (US 15 Bus.)/US 501 Bus. split from US 15/US 501. Before the business routes rejoin on the other side of Durham, I-85 merges into US 15 Bus. Then, I-85/US 15 go north. Right after crossing Falls Lake at exit 186, US 15 splits off to the east. US 15 runs parallel to I-85, going through the city of Creedmoor. It then crosses back over I-85, goes through the city of Oxford, on through Bullock, and then to the North Carolina–Virginia state line.

=== Virginia ===
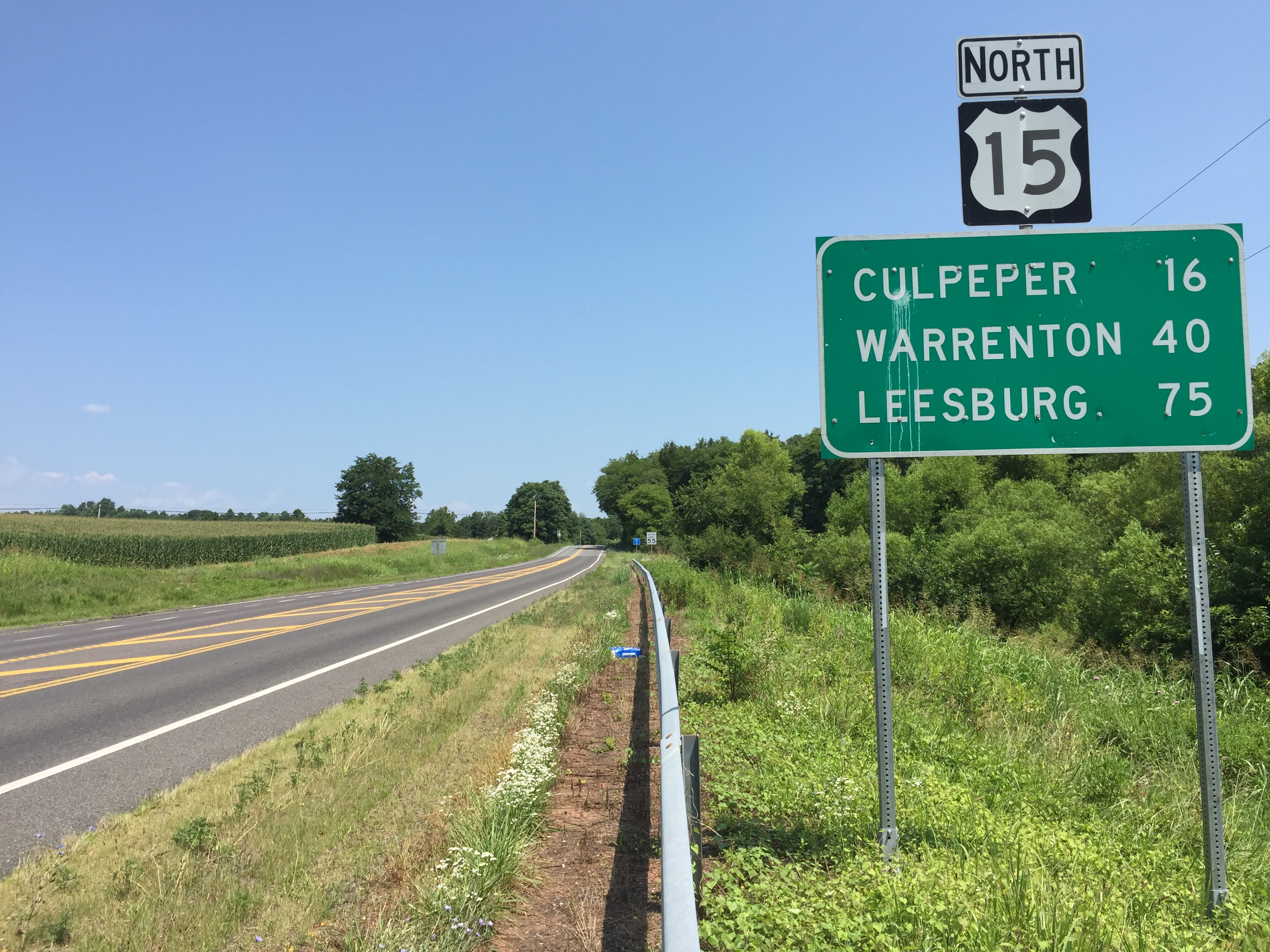
View north along US 15 north of SR 230 in Madison Mills, Virginia

Virginia's section of US 15 starts in Mecklenburg County. Not far from the state line, it crosses a narrow finger of Kerr Lake. The highway goes through the town of Clarksville and merges very briefly with US 58/State Route 49 (SR 49) and then crosses over the main body of Kerr Lake. US 15 continues a little ways and merges with US 360. The two highways go on to the town of Keysville. After Keysville, US 15 branches off and goes to the town of Farmville. After a brief merge with US 460, US 15 goes through the towns of Dillwyn, New Canton (on the James River), Fork Union, and Palmyra before crossing I-64 at Zion Crossroads. After passing the Interstate, US 15 goes through the towns of Gordonsville (with a quick merge with US 33) and Orange, and then on to Culpeper. After Culpeper, US 15 runs concurrent with US 29. In Warrenton, they briefly merge with US 17. South of Gainesville, US 15 breaks off and crosses I-66. From there, it goes on to Leesburg and then to the state line.

=== Maryland ===
US 15 starts in Maryland at Point of Rocks, crossing the Potomac River and then merges into US 340 just south of Frederick. In Frederick, US 40 merges with US 15 for a very short distance. From there, US 15 goes through Thurmont and on to the Maryland–Pennsylvania border.

=== Pennsylvania and New York ===
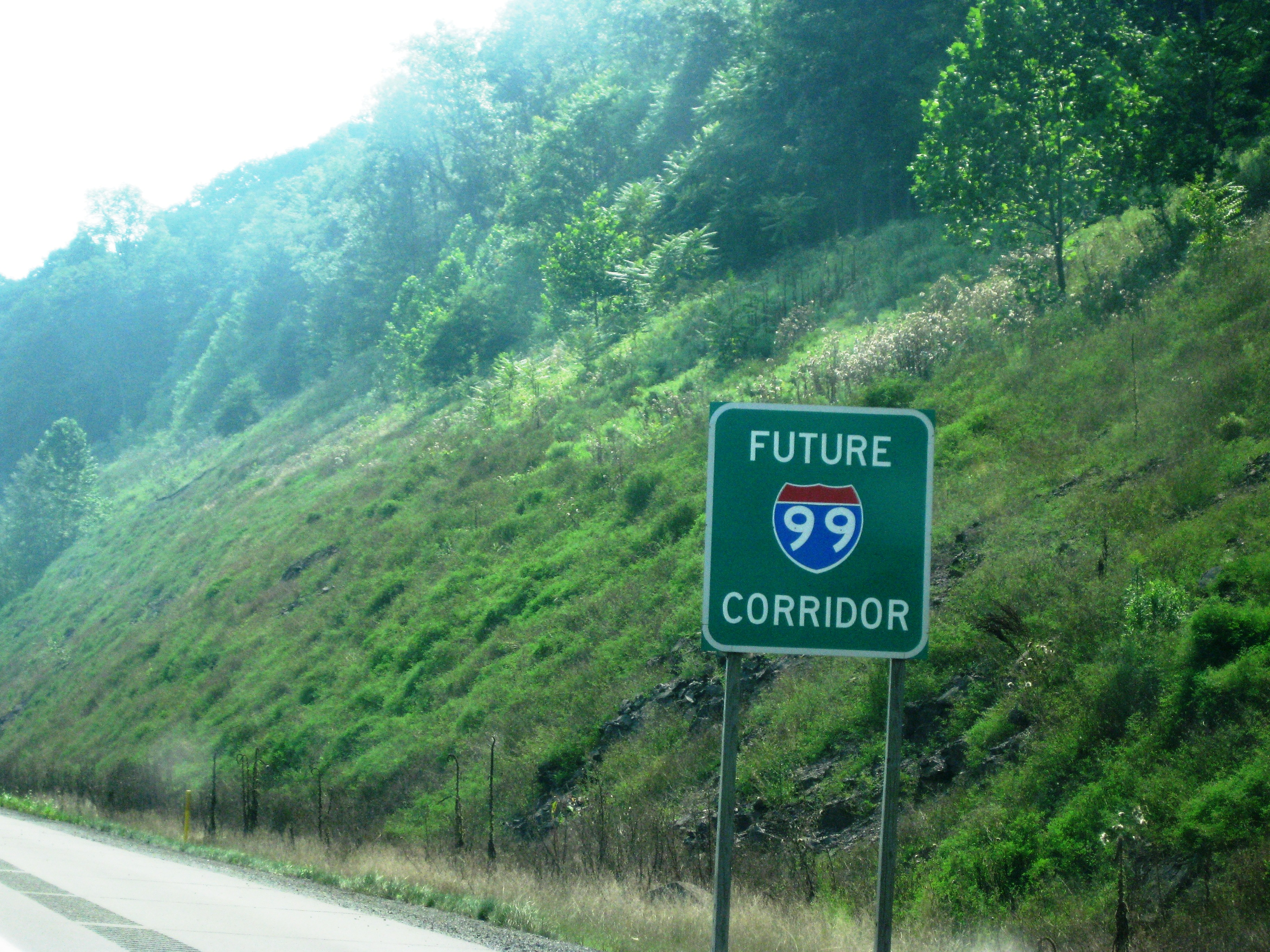
"Future I-99 Corridor" sign on US 15 southbound north of Williamsport, Pennsylvania

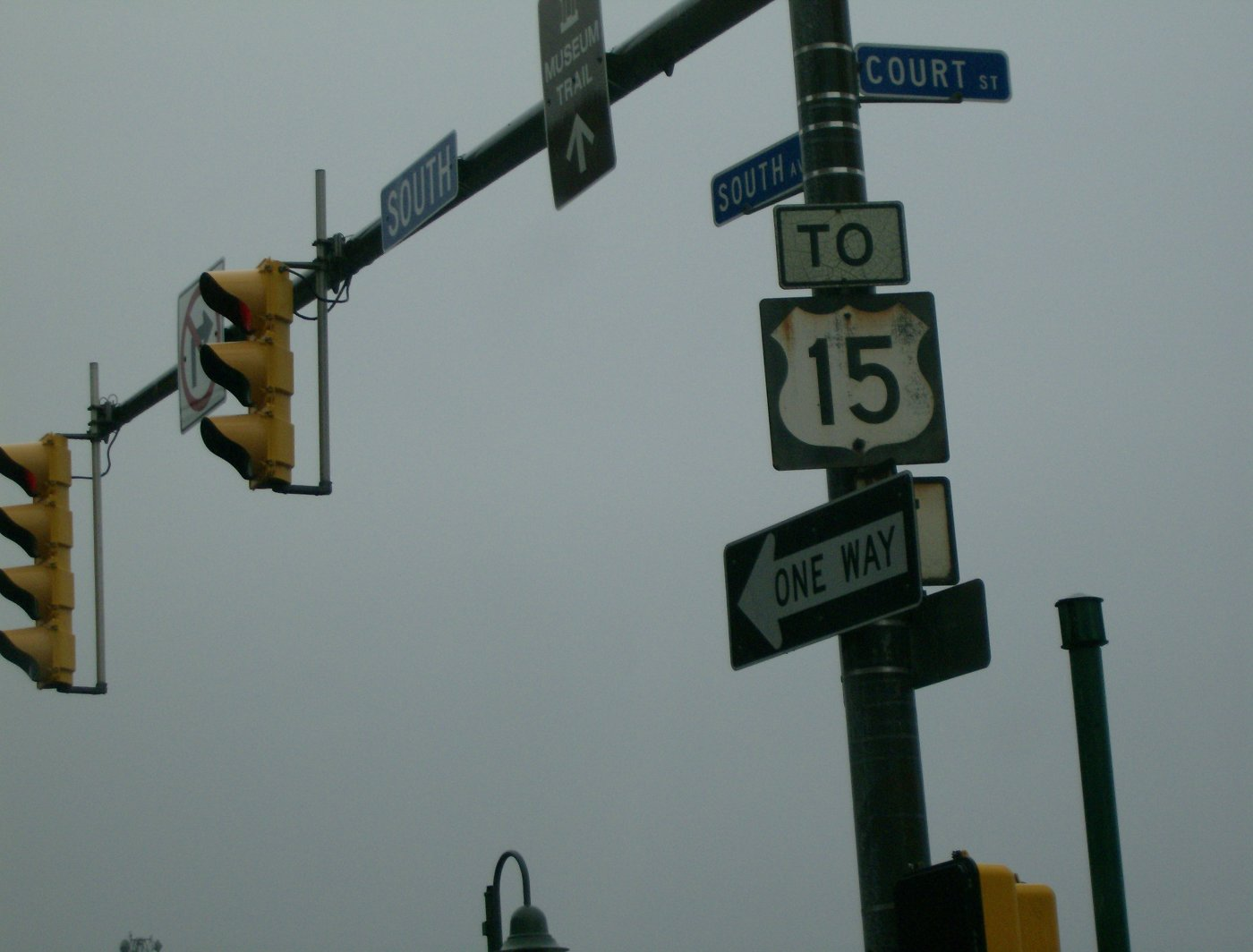
Authentic US 15 shield at the former northern terminus in Rochester, New York

US 15 enters Pennsylvania south of Gettysburg. US 15 Bus. (Emmitsburg Road) goes through Gettysburg, while US 15 bypasses the borough; the bypass continues to York Springs. US 15 passes through Dillsburg before becoming a freeway near Grantham and the Messiah University campus.

US 15 continues as a freeway until it intersects US 11 and Pennsylvania Route 581 in Camp Hill. US 15 runs concurrent with US 11, passing Harrisburg on the west shore of the Susquehanna River. The concurrency ends at Shamokin Dam, where US 11 splits and follows the North Branch Susquehanna River, and US 15 follows the West Branch Susquehanna River north toward Williamsport where it passes through Lewisburg and the campus of Bucknell University (which is partially bisected by the highway). In the future, US 15 and US 11 will diverge in Selinsgrove, from which US 15 will proceed north on a road currently under construction and connect back to its current alignment near Winfield. US 11 will be joined to a business loop of US 15 instead of the main route.

The segment from Williamsport, Pennsylvania, to the northern terminus at I-86 and NY 17 in Painted Post, New York, has been completely upgraded to Interstate standards, except for one access road at milemarker 150.1, in preparation for the eventual transition to designation as I-99, as has the US 15/I-86 interchange. The 12.59-mile (20.26 km) segment of US 15 in New York runs parallel to the Tioga River from the state line to its current northern terminus at I-86 and NY 17 exit 44 at the junction of the Tioga and Cohocton rivers in Painted Post, west of downtown Corning. The entire length of US 15 in New York is signed concurrently with I-99.

== History ==
Until 1974, US 15 continued north of NY 17 and entered Painted Post on North Hamilton Street. At what is now the junction of County Route 41 and NY 415 in downtown Painted Post, US 15 turned north onto NY 415. At the northern terminus of NY 415, located at NY 15 and NY 21 south of Wayland, US 15 followed the current routing of NY 15 into downtown Rochester, where it terminated at NY 31.

US 15 has shed considerable length in near-continuous realignment and regrading over the years. Prior to the completion of the Tioga Creek flood-control project, hastened by the flooding caused after Hurricane Agnes along the Pennsylvania and New York segments of US 15 in June 1972, US 15 passed through many small towns in Pennsylvania as it passed from Lawrenceville, at the New York border, to West Milton, where the road begins to follow the west bank of the Susquehanna River. Originally a winding two-lane road over numerous mountains, US 15 now bypasses many small towns such as Sebring, Blossburg, Covington, Canoe Camp, and Hepburnville. In the 1970s, the challenging two-lane alignment was expanded in some areas to four lanes by building a second set of lanes. Now, for some stretches, the "old" road is the northbound side and in other sections, the southbound side.

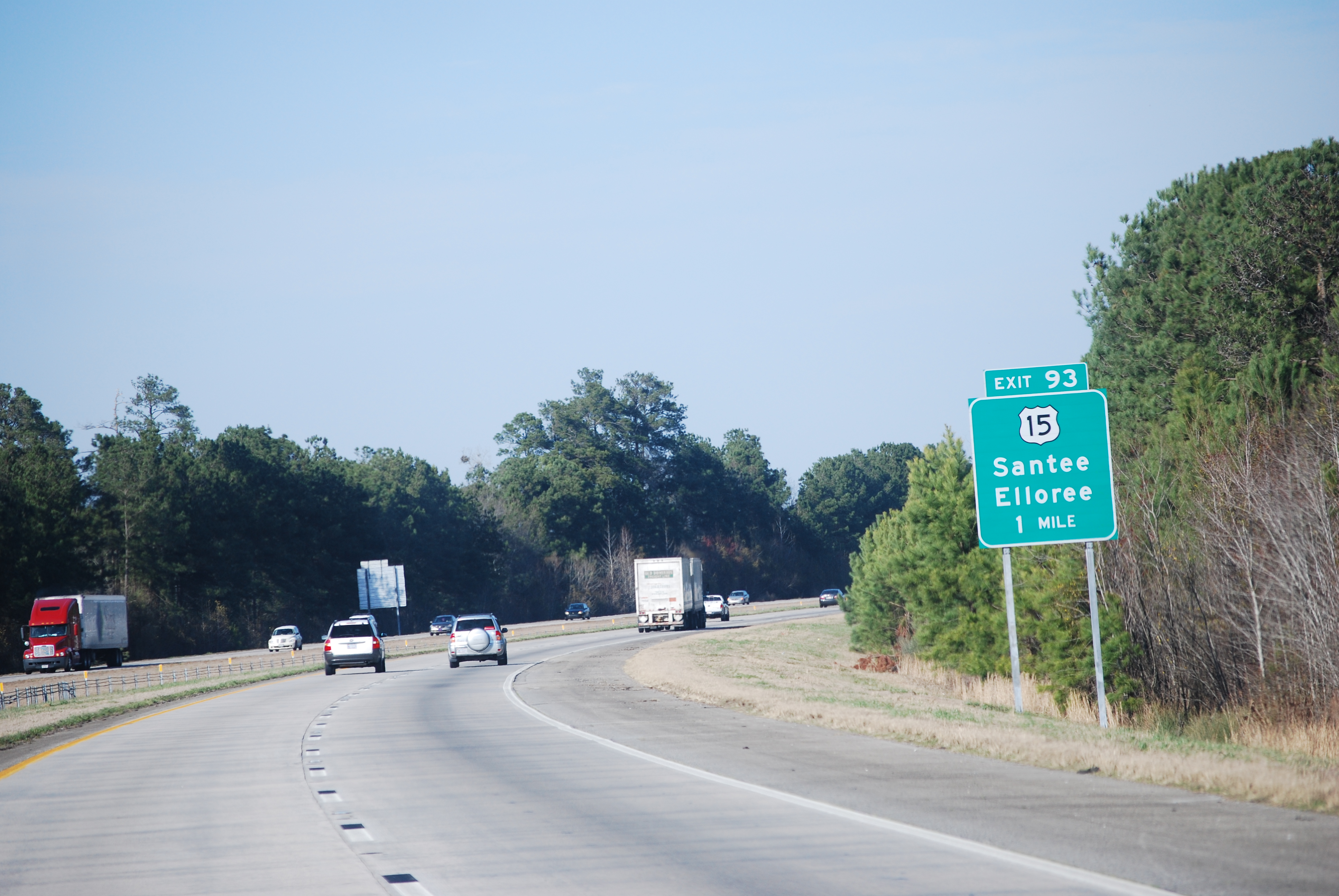
Signage for US 15 along I-95 in South Carolina

Near Mansfield, Pennsylvania, the old US 15 alignment is now a 2.5-mile (4.0 km) access road leading to a boat ramp, built where the old road now disappears into the Tioga Reservoir. Near Tioga, Pennsylvania, drivers crossing the tall concrete bridge can see where a two-lane road (formerly US 15), still marked with double yellow lines, disappears into the water.

== Scenic Byway ==
In October 2009, a 180-mile (290 km) portion of US 15 from Charlottesville, Virginia, to Gettysburg, Pennsylvania, was designated a National Scenic Byway by the U.S. secretary of transportation. The byway will be known as the Journey Through Hallowed Ground. With this designation, the route and historic sites along the route are now eligible for preservation grants.

== Major intersections ==
South Carolina
US 17 Alt. in Walterboro
US 78 in St. George
US 178 in Rosinville
I-26 north-northeast of Rosinville
US 176 in Wells
I-95 south-southeast of Dantzler
US 301 southwest of Santee. The highways travel concurrently to Summerton.
I-95 southeast of Santee. The highways travel concurrently to Adams Landing.
US 521 in South Sumter.
US 401 in Sumter
US 76 / US 378 on the Sumter–Mulberry city line
I-20 southwest of Bishopville
US 52 / US 401 southwest of Society Hill. US 15/US 52 travel concurrently to Society Hill. US 15/US 401 travel concurrently to Laurinburg, North Carolina.
North Carolina
Future I-74 / US 74 / US 501 in Laurinburg. US 15/US 501 travel concurrently to Durham.
US 1 in Aberdeen. The highways travel concurrently through the city.
US 1 south of Sanford. The highways travel concurrently to Sanford.
US 421 in Sanford
US 64 in Pittsboro
I-40 in Durham
I-85 / US 70 in Durham. I-85/US 15 travel concurrently to Dutchville Township. US 15/US 70 travel concurrently through the city.
I-85 south-southwest of Oxford
US 158 in Oxford
Virginia
US 58 in Clarksville
US 58 in Clarksville
US 360 north-northeast of Wylliesburg. The highways travel concurrently to north of Keysville.
US 460 south of Farmville. The highways travel concurrently to west of Farmville.
US 60 in Sprouses Corner
US 250 in Zion Crossroads
I-64 north-northeast of Zion Crossroads
US 33 south of Gordonsville. The highways travel concurrently to Gordonsville.
US 29 south of Culpeper. The highways travel concurrently to Gainesville.
US 522 southeast of Culpeper
US 17 in Opal. The highways travel concurrently to Warrenton.
I-66 in Haymarket
US 50 in Gilberts Corner
Maryland
US 340 east of Jefferson. The highways travel concurrently to .
I-70 in Ballenger Creek
US 40 / US 340 in Frederick. US 15/US 40 travel concurrently through the city.
Pennsylvania
US 30 in Straban Township
I-76 in Upper Allen Township
US 11 in Camp Hill. The highways travel concurrently to Shamokin Dam.
I-81 in Summerdale
US 22 / US 322 in Penn Township
US 522 in Monroe Township
I-80 in White Deer Township
I-180 / US 220 in Williamsport. The highways travel concurrently through the city.
Future I-99 / I-180 / US 220 in Williamsport. I-99/US 15 will travel concurrently to Erwin, New York.
US 6 in Mansfield
New York
I-99 at the New York–Pennsylvania border. The highways travel concurrently to Erwin.
I-86 in Erwin

Browse numbered routes
← SC 14	SC	→ SC 16
← MD 14	MD	→ MD 16
← PA 14	PA	→ PA 16
