= Lindley, New York =

- Town
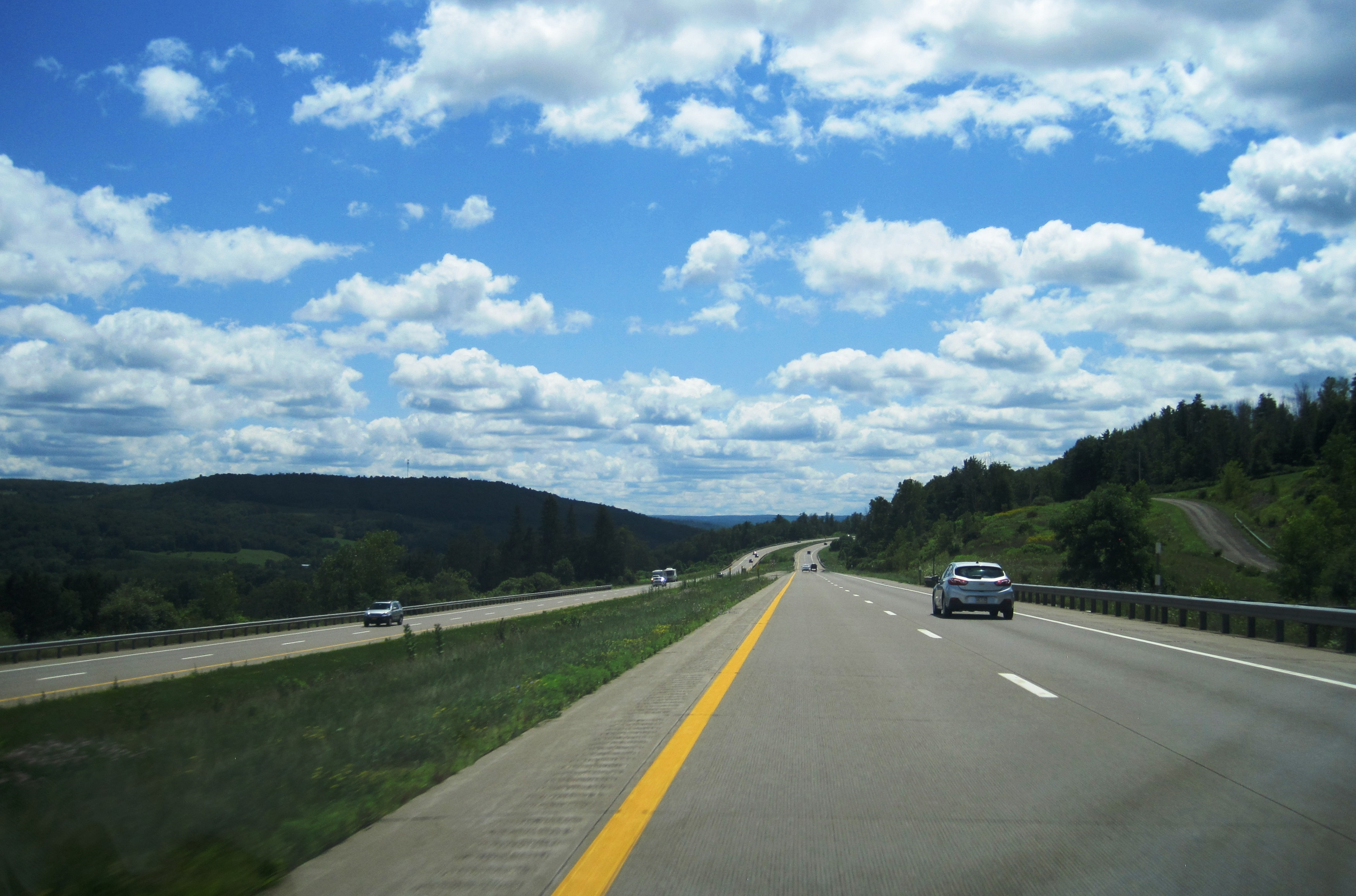
- Southbound I-99 in Lindley

- Location within the state of New York
- Coordinates: 42°2′47″N 77°8′42″W
- Country: United States
- State: New York
- County: Steuben

Area
  - Total: 37.87 sq mi (98.08 km^{2})
  - Land: 37.60 sq mi (97.38 km^{2})
  - Water: 0.27 sq mi (0.70 km^{2})
- Elevation: 1,224 ft (373 m)

Population (2020)
  - Total: 1,816 ▼
  - Estimate (2021): 1,794
  - Density: 52/sq mi (19.9/km^{2})
- Time zone: UTC-5 (Eastern (EST))
  - Summer (DST): UTC-4 (EDT)
- ZIP code: 14858
- Area code: 607
- FIPS code: 36-42576
- GNIS feature ID: 0979153
- Website: https://townoflindley.com/

Lindley is a town in southern Steuben County, New York, United States. The population was 1,816 at the 2020 census.

The town is situated south of the city of Corning.

== History ==
In 1789, Eleazer Lindsley, who was originally from Morristown, New Jersey, had been invited to participate in the Treaty of Canandaigua, in which he bought a plot of land. After serving in the New Jersey State Assembly, Lindsley along with 37 aquatencies left New Jersey to build a settlement in this newly purchased land. Originally, the town had been known as Lindsley or Lindleytown, but in later years the "s" was dropped and the town is now known as Lindley.

== Geography ==
According to the United States Census Bureau, the town has a total area of 37.9 square miles (98 km^{2}), of which 37.5 square miles (97 km^{2}) is land and 0.3 square miles (0.78 km^{2}) (0.90%) is water.

The south town line is the border of Tioga County, Pennsylvania. Interstate 99/U.S. Route 15 and the Tioga River pass in a north–south direction through the town.

== Demographics ==
Historical population
Census	Pop.	Note	%±
1840	638		—
1850	686		7.5%
1860	886		29.2%
1870	1,251		41.2%
1880	1,563		24.9%
1890	1,537		−1.7%
1900	1,306		−15.0%
1910	1,153		−11.7%
1920	1,024		−11.2%
1930	945		−7.7%
1940	961		1.7%
1950	1,043		8.5%
1960	1,313		25.9%
1970	1,414		7.7%
1980	1,831		29.5%
1990	1,862		1.7%
2000	1,913		2.7%
2010	1,967		2.8%
2020	1,816		−7.7%
2021 (est.)	1,794		−1.2%
U.S. Decennial Census

As of the census of 2000, there were 1,913 people, 697 households, and 545 families residing in the town. The population density was 50.9 inhabitants per square mile (19.7/km^{2}). There were 763 housing units at an average density of 20.3 per square mile (7.8/km^{2}). The racial makeup of the town was 98.22% White, 0.31% African American, 0.21% Native American, 0.16% Asian, 0.16% from other races, and 0.94% from two or more races. Hispanic or Latino of any race were 0.68% of the population.

There were 697 households, out of which 35.9% had children under the age of 18 living with them, 63.3% were married couples living together, 9.8% had a female householder with no husband present, and 21.7% were non-families. 17.2% of all households were made up of individuals, and 6.5% had someone living alone who was 65 years of age or older. The average household size was 2.74 and the average family size was 3.02.

In the town, the population was spread out, with 27.6% under the age of 18, 9.0% from 18 to 24, 27.8% from 25 to 44, 26.0% from 45 to 64, and 9.6% who were 65 years of age or older. The median age was 35 years. For every 100 females, there were 102.9 males. For every 100 females age 18 and over, there were 101.6 males.

The median income for a household in the town was $37,443, and the median income for a family was $41,250. Males had a median income of $30,037 versus $24,750 for females. The per capita income for the town was $15,625. About 13.5% of families and 15.9% of the population were below the poverty line, including 26.8% of those under age 18 and 5.2% of those age 65 or over.

== Communities and other locations in the Town of Lindley ==
- East Lindley – A hamlet by the east part town line on County Road 120 and Tannery Creek.
- Lawrenceville – A hamlet on the south town line is a continuation of a larger community with the same name in Pennsylvania (See: Lawrenceville, Pennsylvania).
- Lindley – The hamlet of Lindley is near the center of the town on US Route 15 and the east bank of the Tioga River.
- Presho – A hamlet in the north part of the town on US Route 15 and on the west bank of the Tioga River.
