= Gang Mills, New York =

- CDP
- Location of Gang Mills within New York state
- Coordinates: 42°8′59″N 77°7′10″W
- Country: United States
- State: New York
- County: Steuben

Area
  - Total: 4.40 sq mi (11.39 km^{2})
  - Land: 4.37 sq mi (11.33 km^{2})
  - Water: 0.023 sq mi (0.06 km^{2})
- Elevation: 935 ft (285 m)

Population (2020)
  - Total: 4,261
  - Density: 970/sq mi (376/km^{2})
- Time zone: UTC-5 (Eastern (EST))
  - Summer (DST): UTC-4 (EDT)
- FIPS code: 36-28145
- GNIS feature ID: 0970157

Gang Mills is a hamlet (and census-designated place) in Steuben County, New York. As of the 2020 census, Gang Mills had a population of 4,261.

Gang Mills is located in the town of Erwin, southwest of Corning. During the mid 1800s, it was the site of gang-saw mills to cut lumber.

== Geography ==
Gang Mills is located at 42°8′59″N 77°7′10″W (42.149649, -77.119346). According to the U.S. Census Bureau, the CDP has a total area of 6.5 square miles (17 km^{2}), all land.

The community is located next to the Tioga River on U.S. Route 15.

== Demographics ==
Historical population
Census	Pop.	Note	%±
2020	4,261		—
U.S. Decennial Census

=== 2020 census ===
As of the 2020 census, Gang Mills had a population of 4,261. The median age was 43.1 years. 22.6% of residents were under the age of 18 and 18.7% of residents were 65 years of age or older. For every 100 females there were 93.4 males, and for every 100 females age 18 and over there were 89.0 males age 18 and over.

100.0% of residents lived in urban areas, while 0.0% lived in rural areas.

There were 1,740 households in Gang Mills, of which 32.1% had children under the age of 18 living in them. Of all households, 52.4% were married-couple households, 16.9% were households with a male householder and no spouse or partner present, and 25.6% were households with a female householder and no spouse or partner present. About 31.2% of all households were made up of individuals and 14.5% had someone living alone who was 65 years of age or older.

There were 1,880 housing units, of which 7.4% were vacant. The homeowner vacancy rate was 0.6% and the rental vacancy rate was 9.9%.

Racial composition as of the 2020 census
Race	Number	Percent
White	3,071	72.1%
Black or African American	154	3.6%
American Indian and Alaska Native	12	0.3%
Asian	795	18.7%
Native Hawaiian and Other Pacific Islander	0	0.0%
Some other race	21	0.5%
Two or more races	208	4.9%
Hispanic or Latino (of any race)	62	1.5%

=== 2000 census ===
As of the 2000 census, there were 3,304 people, 1,279 households, and 868 families residing in Gang Mills. The population density was 506.0 inhabitants per square mile (195.4/km^{2}). There were 1,374 housing units at an average density of 210.4 per square mile (81.2/km^{2}). The racial makeup of the CDP was 87.05% White, 3.66% African American, 0.15% Native American, 8.05% Asian, 0.15% from other races, and 0.94% from two or more races. Hispanic or Latino of any race were 1.57% of the population.

There were 1,279 households, out of which 37.9% had children under the age of 18 living with them, 55.0% were married couples living together, 9.9% had a female householder with no husband present, and 32.1% were non-families. 28.9% of all households were made up of individuals, and 13.1% had someone living alone who was 65 years of age or older. The average household size was 2.48 and the average family size was 3.08.

In the CDP, the population was spread out, with 27.7% under the age of 18, 5.8% from 18 to 24, 28.8% from 25 to 44, 21.9% from 45 to 64, and 15.7% who were 65 years of age or older. The median age was 38 years. For every 100 females, there were 92.2 males. For every 100 females age 18 and over, there were 85.5 males.

The median income for a household in the CDP was $51,473, and the median income for a family was $68,611. Males had a median income of $54,922 versus $30,174 for females. The per capita income for the CDP was $31,209. About 6.8% of families and 8.3% of the population were below the poverty line, including 10.9% of those under age 18 and 3.1% of those age 65 or over.

== Education ==
Gang Mills is part of the Corning-Painted Post School District.

== See also ==
- List of census-designated places in New York (state)
