= National Register of Historic Places listings in Schuyler County, New York =

Location of Schuyler County in New York

List of the National Register of Historic Places listings in Schuyler County, New York

This is intended to be a complete list of properties and districts listed on the National Register of Historic Places in Schuyler County, New York. The locations of National Register properties and districts (at least for all showing latitude and longitude coordinates below) may be seen in a map by clicking on "Map of all coordinates". One site, Lamoka, is further designated a U.S. National Historic Landmark.

This National Park Service list is complete through NPS recent listings posted May 15, 2026.

Contents: Counties in New York
Albany (Albany) – Allegany – Bronx – Broome – Cattaraugus – Cayuga – Chautauqua – Chemung – Chenango – Clinton – Columbia – Cortland – Delaware – Dutchess (Poughkeepsie, Rhinebeck) – Erie (Buffalo) – Essex – Franklin – Fulton – Genesee – Greene – Hamilton – Herkimer – Jefferson – Kings – Lewis – Livingston – Madison – Monroe (Rochester) – Montgomery – Nassau – New York (Below 14th Street, 14th to 59th Streets, 59th to 110th Streets, Above 110th Street, Islands) – Niagara (Niagara Falls) – Oneida – Onondaga (Syracuse) – Ontario – Orange – Orleans – Oswego – Otsego – Putnam – Queens – Rensselaer – Richmond – Rockland – St. Lawrence – Saratoga – Schenectady – Schoharie – Schuyler – Seneca – Steuben – Suffolk – Sullivan – Tioga – Tompkins – Ulster – Warren – Washington – Wayne – Westchester (Northern, Southern, New Rochelle, Peekskill, Yonkers) – Wyoming – Yates

== Listings county-wide ==
	Name on the Register	Image	Date listed	Location	City or town	Description
1	Brick Tavern Stand	Brick Tavern Stand	November 4, 1994 (#94001283)	108 Catharine St. 42°20′51″N 76°50′43″W	Montour Falls	
2	A. F. Chapman House	A. F. Chapman House	December 8, 1997 (#97001526)	115 S. Monroe St. 42°22′53″N 76°52′29″W	Watkins Glen	
3	Coon Family Log Cabin		November 16, 2015 (#15000802)	2245 Hornby Rd. 42°17′28″N 76°57′51″W	Beaver Dams vicinity	Depression-era home built from found materials by local CCC instructor
4	First Baptist Church of Watkins Glen	First Baptist Church of Watkins Glen	September 13, 2001 (#01000996)	Fifth St. and Porter St. 42°22′50″N 76°52′12″W	Watkins Glen	
5	First Presbyterian Church of Hector	First Presbyterian Church of Hector	May 25, 2001 (#01000547)	5519 NY 414; 42°30′01″N 76°52′23″W	Hector	
6	First Presbyterian Church of Watkins Glen	First Presbyterian Church of Watkins Glen	December 23, 2019 (#100004801)	520 North Decatur St. 42°22′49″N 76°52′14″W	Watkins Glen	1878 Romanesque Revival church from peak of village's era as a tourist destination
7	Lamoka		October 15, 1966 (#66000571)	Address restricted	Tyrone	
8	Lattin-Crandall Octagon Barn	Lattin-Crandall Octagon Barn	September 29, 1984 (#84002970)	E of Catherine; 42°18′43″N 76°46′04″W	Catharine	
9	Lawrence Memorial Chapel and Cemetery		January 30, 2025 (#100011344)	2770 State Route 228; 42°22′04″N 76°44′40″W	Catharine	
10	Lee School	Lee School	May 20, 1998 (#98000572)	NY 14; 42°19′40″N 76°50′28″W	Montour	
11	Logan Methodist Church	Logan Methodist Church	January 26, 2001 (#00001690)	Jct. of Cty. Rts. 4 and 2; 42°29′15″N 76°49′43″W	Logan	
12	Montour Falls Historic District	Montour Falls Historic District	August 31, 1978 (#78001911)	Main and Genesee Sts. 42°20′41″N 76°50′58″W	Montour Falls	
13	Montour Falls Union Grammar School	Montour Falls Union Grammar School	November 28, 2012 (#12000983)	208 W. Broadway; 42°20′58″N 76°50′36″W	Montour Falls	
14	St. James Episcopal Church	St. James Episcopal Church	November 21, 2012 (#12000960)	112 6th St. 42°22′47″N 76°52′17″W	Watkins Glen	
15	Schuyler County Courthouse Complex	Schuyler County Courthouse Complex	June 5, 1974 (#74001305)	Franklin St. 42°22′36″N 76°52′16″W	Watkins Glen	
16	Second Baptist Church of Wayne	Second Baptist Church of Wayne	December 10, 2014 (#14001021)	69 NY 230; 42°28′15″N 77°06′24″W	Wayne	Also known as the Wayne Village Baptist Church, this 1848 Greek Revival church is very well-preserved
17	Six Nations Cemetery		May 4, 2026 (#100012959)	Kelly Hill Road; 42°22′24″N 77°02′47″W	Orange	
18	US Post Office-Watkins Glen	US Post Office-Watkins Glen	May 11, 1989 (#88002443)	600 N. Franklin St. 42°22′45″N 76°52′21″W	Watkins Glen	
19	Watkins Glen Commercial Historic District	Watkins Glen Commercial Historic District	January 4, 2012 (#11001009)	108-400 & 201-317 N. Franklin St., 111 W. 4th St. & 215 S. Madison St. 42°22′53″N 76°52′26″W	Watkins Glen	
20	Watkins Glen Grand Prix Course, 1948-1952	Watkins Glen Grand Prix Course, 1948-1952	December 4, 2002 (#02001397)	Franklin St., NY 329, NY 409; 42°22′15″N 76°53′26″W	Watkins Glen	
21	Watkins Glen High School	Watkins Glen High School	February 12, 2015 (#15000008)	900 N. Decatur St. 42°22′40″N 76°52′19″W	Watkins Glen	Now-closed 1928 school with sympathetic 1958 wing epitomizes early 20th-century Classical Revival multi-story standardized public school design
22	Weston Schoolhouse	Weston Schoolhouse	October 8, 1998 (#98001241)	463 Cty Rte 23; 42°25′19″N 77°04′38″W	Weston	

== See also ==
- National Register of Historic Places listings in New York
