= Liberty Highway =

Liberty Highway
- Map of the Liberty Highway

Route information
- Existed: 1918–present

Major junctions
- West end: Cleveland, OH
- East end: New York City

Location
- Country: United States
- States: Ohio, Pennsylvania, New York, New Jersey

Highway system
- Auto trails

The Liberty Highway was an auto trail in the United States linking New York City with Cleveland, Ohio. It passed through Binghamton, New York; Elmira, New York; Jamestown, New York; and Erie, Pennsylvania. First signed in 1918, it was named after the village of Liberty, New York.

Through New Jersey and New York, the route of the Liberty Highway was designated as Route 17. Today, much of these routes have been bypassed by freeways, most notably by Interstate 86. Throughout much of the Catskills and the Southern Tier of New York, old portions of the road are still named Liberty Highway or Old Route 17.

== History ==
The moniker "Liberty Highway" was first given by R. H. Johnson, who was the manager of the New York branch of the White Motorcar Company. Because well-known highways like the Liberty Highway were clogged with traffic, he studied maps and found a more direct route through the Southern Tier, which was better maintained and far less traveled. He christened it after Liberty, New York, through which the route travels, and to the "spirit of the times".

Johnson first published his route in Motor Age Magazine. Further publicity was brought by other publications, and a film commissioned by Johnson. The Liberty Highway Association was formed in 1919 to further promote the route.

Beginning with the designation of Route 17 over the highway in New York in 1924, the Liberty Highway label began to fall out of fashion, though it was still being advertised as late as 1928 by the AAA. When Route 17 began to be upgraded to a freeway, the Liberty Highway was long forgotten.

== First routing ==
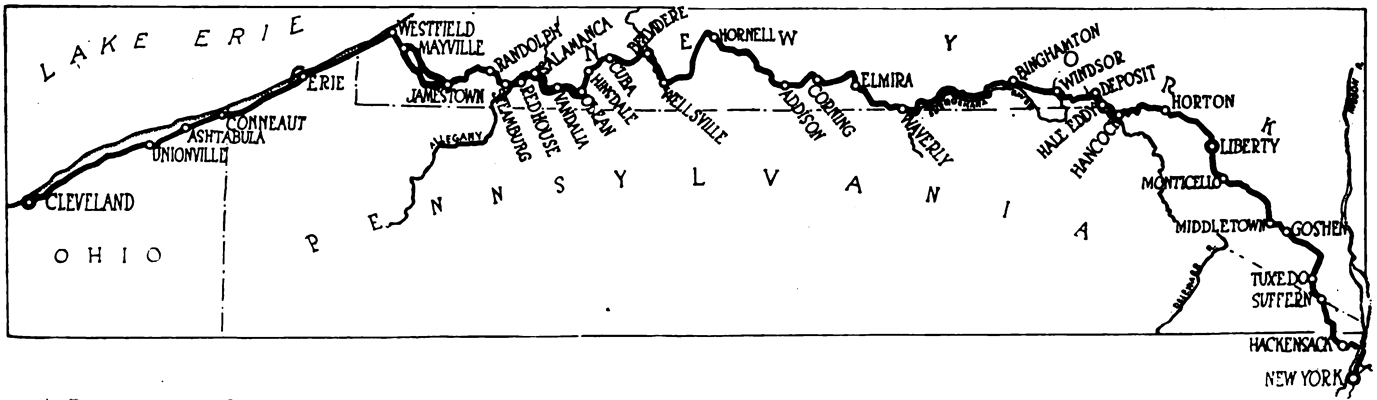
Original map of Liberty Highway route

=== Manhattan ===
- Dyckman Street, 10th Avenue to Englewood Ferry

=== New Jersey ===
- Henry Hudson Drive, Englewood Ferry through Englewood Cliffs
- County Route 505, Englewood Cliffs to Englewood
- Bennet Road
- Englewood Avenue
- Bergen County Route 37
- Bergen County Route 64 into Teaneck
- Queen Anne Road
- Bergen County Route 60 into Hackensack
- Bergen County Route 62, Hackensack to Ho-Ho-Kus
- County Route 507, Ridgewood to New York line at Mahwah

=== New York ===
==== Rockland County ====
- U.S. Route 202, New Jersey line at Suffern
- New York State Route 59, Suffern to Hillburn
- New York State Route 17, Hillburn to Orange County Line

==== Orange County ====
- New York State Route 17, Rockland County Line to Harriman
- New York State Route 17M, Harriman to Fair Oaks
  - Main Street through Harriman
  - Main Street, Hambletonian Avenue, Ward Road through Chester
  - Old Chester Road, Church Street, Main Street through Goshen
  - Denton Hill Road, Sly Place through New Hampton
  - Academy Avenue and North Street through Middletown

==== Sullivan County ====
- Sullivan County Routes 170-179, Fair Oaks to Rockland
  - Old Liberty Road through Rockland

==== Delaware County ====
- Delaware County Route 17, Rockland to Hancock
  - Cooks Falls Road through Cooks Falls
- New York State Route 17, Hancock to Deposit Town
  - Bush Hilltop Road through Deposit
  - Lower Hale Eddy Road through Deposit
  - Hale Eddy Road through Hale Eddy
- New York State Route 8, Deposit Town into Deposit
- Oak Street, Pine Street, through Deposit, Deposit Town
- Second Street, from Deposit, Deposit Town to Deposit, Sanford Town

==== Broome County ====
- Broome County Route 28, Deposit, Sanford Town to West Windsor
- Quickway through Kirkwood
  - Foley Road, West Windsor to Kirkwood
- U.S. Route 11, Kirkwood to Binghamton
  - Industrial Park Road, Barlow Road through Kirkwood
- New York State Route 17C, Binghamton to Tioga County Line
  - Watson Boulevard, River Road, Pelican Lane, Kent Avenue through Endicott

==== Tioga County ====
- New York State Route 17C, Broome County Line to Waverly
  - Belknap Road, Owego
- Tioga County Route 106, Waverly to Chemung County Line

==== Chemung County ====
- Chemung County Route 60, Waverly to Elmira Town
- New York State Route 17, Elmira Town
- New York State Route 352, Elmira
- Madison Avenue, Lake Street, Elmira to Horseheads
- New York State Route 17, Horseheads
- Chemung County Route 64, Horseheads to Big Flats
- New York State Route 352, Big Flats to Steuben County Line

==== Steuben County ====
- New York State Route 352, Chemung County Line to Corning Town
- Old State Avenue, College Avenue, Corning Town to Corning
- Market Street, Pine Street Bridge, Center Way, Corning
- New York State Route 415, Corning to Painted Post
- New York State Route 417^{†}, Painted Post to Jasper
  - Steuben County Route 79, Gang Mills
  - Old State Road, Old State Highway 17, Oak Road, Tuscarora
  - Woodhull-East Woodhull Road, Mill Street, Main Street, Jasper Street, Woodhull
  - Old State Road, Jasper
- New York State Route 36^{†}, Jasper to Hornell
  - Dineen Road, Canisteo
  - McBurney Road, Hornell Road, Hornellsville
  - Canisteo Street, Seneca Street, Hornell
- New York State Route 21^{†}, Hornell to Allegany County Line
  - Almond Road, Hornell to Hornellsville

==== Allegany County ====
- New York State Route 21^{†}, Steuben County Line to Andover
  - Old Whitney Road, Almond
  - Whitford Road, Almond to Alfred Town
  - Shaw Road, Alfred to Alfred Station
  - Hardy Hill Road, Water Street, Main Street, through Andover
- New York State Route 417^{†}, Andover to Wellsville
  - Jackson Road, Dyke Road, Andover
  - State Street, Main Street, Wellsville
- New York State Route 19^{†}, Wellsville to Belvidere
- Allegany County Route 20, Belvidere to Cuba
  - Hubble Hill Road, Cuba Town
  - Main Street, Cuba
- New York State Route 305, Cuba
- New York State Route 446, Cuba to Cattaraugus County Line

==== Cattaraugus County ====
- New York State Route 446, Allegany County Line to Hinsdale
- New York State Route 16, Hinsdale to Olean
  - Old Route 16, Main Street, Hinsdale
  - Old Route 16, Main Street, Olean
- New York State Route 417^{†}, Olean to Jimersontown
  - First Street, Creekside Drive, Old State Road, Blair Road, Allegany
  - Center Street, Front Avenue, Salamanca
- New York State Reference Route 951T^{†}, Jimersontown to Steamburg

The former Liberty Highway still exists but is closed to traffic between Red House and Steamburg

- New York State Route 394, Steamburg to Chautauqua County Line

==== Chautauqua County ====
- New York State Route 394, Cattaraugus County Line to Jamestown
  - Carter Street, Lindquist Street, Poland
- Second Street, Third Street, Washington Street, Jamestown
- New York State Route 430^{†}, Jamestown to Mayville
  - Chautauqua County Route 126, Ellicot
  - Lakeside Drive, Bemus Point to Ellery
  - Sunset Bay Drive, Ellery
- New York State Route 394^{†}, Mayville to Westfield
- U.S. Route 20, Westfield to Pennsylvania Line at Ripley
  - Old Route 20, Forsyth Road, Ripley

=== Pennsylvania ===
- U.S. Route 20, New York line at North East Township to the Ohio Line at Springfield
  - Stinson Road, Old Buffalo Road, North East Township
  - Buffalo Road, 18th Street, State Street, Erie
  - East Main Street, East Springfield

=== Ohio ===
- U.S. Route 20, Pennsylvania Line at Conneaut to Cleveland
  - Old Main Street, Main Street, Conneaut
  - State Road, 46th Street, Edgewood
  - 46th Street, Main Avenue, Center Street, Ashtabula
  - West Main Street, Geneva
  - Red Mill Valley Road, North Perry
  - Ohio Route 640, Willoughby to Willowick
  - Ohio Route 283, Willowick to Cleveland
  - Saint Clair Avenue, East 9th Street, Superior Avenue, Cleveland

Second-order bullet points indicate parts of the main route that were re-routed as the highway was upgraded
^{†}Former routing of New York State Route 17. As Route 17 was reassigned, the Liberty Highway designation was moved onto these new segments.

== Later additions ==
As late as 1928, the highway association added other roads to its system, including realignments of Route 17. The following names are descriptive, rather than official monikers.

=== Chautauqua branch ===
- New York State Route 394, Mayville to Chautauqua

=== Little Valley loop ===
- New York State Route 242, East Randolph to Town of Little Valley
- New York State Route 353, Town of Little Valley to Salamanca
  - Kilburne Corners Road, Town of Little Valley

=== Bath loop ===
- Seneca Road, Hornell to North Hornell
- Steuben County Route 70A, North Hornell to Avoca Town
- New York State Route 415, Avoca to
  - River Road, Main Street, Kanoka
  - Spaulding Drive, Bath
  - West Morris Street, West Steuben Street, Bath Village
  - Babcock Hollow Road, Selleck Road, Coon Road, Utegg Road, Scudder Road, Bath
  - Little Acorn Lane, Maple Lane, Savona
  - Steuben County Route 125, Savona to Campbell
  - Steuben County Route 333, Campbell to Campbell Town
  - Barringer Road, Main Street, Coopers Plains

=== Watkins Glen loop ===
- New York State Route 226, Savona to North Reading
  - Round Lake Road, Bath to Bradford
  - Old State Road, Yawger Hill Road, Bradford to Orange
  - Schuyler County Route 23A, Church Hill Road, Schuyler County Route 23, Tyrone
- New York State Route 14A, North Reading to Reading
  - Altay Road, Schuyler Airfield, Station Hill Spur, NY 14A-14 Connection, Reading
- New York State Route 14, Reading to Horseheads
  - Reading Road, State Point Road, Watkins Glen
  - North Genesee Street, West Main Street, Owego Street, Montour Falls
  - South Genesee Street, Hanrahan Road, Montour
  - Rodabaugh Spur, Veteran
  - Highland Avenue, Stafford Road, Old Route 14, Millport
  - Watkins Road, Grand Central Avenue, Horseheads

=== Susquehanna River south bank loop ===
- New York State Route 96, Owego
- New York State Route 434, Owego to Binghamton
  - Degroat Road, Town of Owego
  - Main Street, Apalachin
  - Owego Road, Town of Owego to Vestal
  - Castle Gardens Road, Front Street, North Main Street, Old Vestal Road, Vestal
- Vestal Avenue, Washington Street, Binghamton

=== Port Jervis loop ===
- New York State Route 42, Monticello to Port Jervis
  - Schoolhouse Road, Thompson
  - St. Joseph's Hill Road, Forestburgh
  - Hagen Road, Bolton Basin Road, Deerpark
  - Main Street, Berme Road, Sparrow Bush
  - Grandview Avenue, West Main Street, Port Jervis
- Pike Street, Front Street, Jersey Avenue, Port Jervis
- U.S. Route 6, Port Jervis to Wawayanda
  - Greenville Turnpike, Greenville
  - Castle High Road, Wawayanda

=== Hudson River east bank loop ===
- New York State Route 17, Woodbury to Harriman
- New York State Route 32, Harriman to Woodbury
  - Maher Road, Woodbury
- Estrada Road, Old U.S. 6, Woodbury
- U.S. Route 6, Woodbury to Peekskill
  - Various unnamed realignments through Harriman and Bear Mountain State Parks
- U.S. Route 9, Peekskill to Manhattan
  - Lower South Street, Albany Post Road, New York State Route 9A, Old Post Road North, Peekskill to Crotonville

== See also ==
- Auto trail
