= Lamoka =

Lamoka may refer to:

- Lamoka site, historical landmark in New York state
- Lamoka Lake, formerly Mud Lake, lake in New York state
