= South Flats earthwork site =

Archaeological site in Michigan

The South Flats earthwork enclosure is one of less than 10 intact earthworks. Located in Western Michigan alongside the Muskegon River, it was originally discovered and excavated by George Quimby. The earthwork itself is about 25 to 30 meters in diameter, and is near a bluff with an overview of the Muskegon. Excavations and surveys suggest and attribute a possible Algonkian speaking small-scale society to the formation of the site. Archaeologists are yet to grasp a full understanding of the South Flats and other similar earthworks spread across the state of Michigan, which date between about 1350 A.D. – 1650 A.D.

== Site history ==
The South Flats Gun Club gained possession of the earthwork in 1929 when they purchased the Muskegon State Game Area in Muskegon County, Michigan. According to Donald et al., this likely helped in preservation efforts., although a few small-scale developmental changes (hunting blinds and stations) there was no large noticeable changes to the property. This organization held control of the land up and until the 1970s when the Michigan Department of Natural Resources acquired the territory, which proceeded to make the region accessible for recreational use. Off-road vehicle use and foot paths for hunters in the historical territory deteriorated the earthwork and efforts to prevent further destruction of the structure took place in the form of barriers to prevent vehicle access.

== Environmental setting ==
The earthwork at South Flats sits atop a high bluff, which is bisected by a small spring, with oversight of the lower floodplain of the Muskegon River within the transition zone of the Canadian and Carolinian biotic provinces. Movement in the lower floodplain is made difficult by the drainage of uplands via springs and creeks. It also lays between a drainage made by Spring Creek on the Southwest end and the Northeastern Mosquito Creek Drainage. Vegetation present in the region is dominated by oak and pine forest, with an abundance of cedar swamps, possibly similar to vegetation present in the pre-settlement period. Soil in the site is of Rubicon series.

== Excavations ==
George Quimby was the first archaeologists to excavate the South Flats earthwork, it was part of the exhibit work he conducted for the Centennial Organization of Muskegon, Michigan in the summer of 1937. The excavation consisted of six units labeled as A to F, yielding minimal cultural material evidence. Quimby's results led him to two conclusions on the functionality of the site: a Late Woodland settlement or a Middle Woodland ceremonial location.

=== Re-excavating South Flats ===
During summer of 2006 a group of personnel from Grand Valley State University began archaeological explorations of the area with the intention of expanding on the original excavations by Quimby, to disturb as little as possible the archaeological site, and further research into the debate of earthwork enclosures and their prehistoric purpose. The crew conducted shovel tests along the west end of the 25 meter bluff as well as on the interior and exterior of the earthen enclosure itself.

==== Results ====
Upon finalizing shovel tests and further excavations of Quimby's 6 units, the crew identified a higher percentage of prehistoric activity inside of the earthwork (87% positive yield of cultural material) than outside of it (37% positive yield). Among the items recovered were lithic and ceramic remains composed of potsherds, stone tools, various fauna, and charcoal residue, with two separate features unearthed in the interior which contained some of these remains.

== Geophysical survey ==
Two non-invasive geophysical surveys were done in 2010 to further explore what lies beneath the surface of the site without further destruction of the structure and landscape, these surveys were done through GPR (Ground Penetrating Radar) and magnetometry. The surveys are significant as this was the only time GPR and magnetometry methods were used at an earthwork site in Michigan.

=== Results ===
Alongside magnetic noise that perfectly aligns with the excavations done by both Quimby and the GVSU crew in 2006, there are a handful of anomalies with no correlation to the previous excavations. Four magnetic high responses, possibly related to the structure itself, are confirmed by a strong GPR reflection contained within 1 meter of the subsurface in the geophysical survey grid, making it an area of interest for future excavation as these anomalies are present on and outside of the enclosure.

Data gathered from both GPR and the magnetometer indicate the existence of additional archaeological features located both inside and outside of the structure that were not discovered during the 2006 excavations, and similar to the findings of those excavations the density of the features is rather low. These newly found possible features of the enclosure are as follows:

- Two contained inside
- One along the northern edge
- Three right outside its perimeter

Although not confirmed by ground excavation, the magnetometer response and GPR reflections confirm the location and existence of these anomalies, which share similar magnetic signatures to those obtained by the geophysical surveys on the already recorded features from the 2006 excavation.

A GPR timeslice provided needed confirmation of the scale and placement of the earthwork enclosure, which could not be identified in previous excavations, marked between 35 and 40 meters in diameter for its exterior limits, making it one of the smallest recorded enclosures in the state of Michigan.

== Artifact and feature analysis ==
=== Quimby's units ===
- Lithics: 13 projectile points and 6 bifaces unearthed from the re-excavation
  - 5 triangularly shaped points from Late Woodland
  - 2 small notched flake points found among the interior earthwork units
  - 4 Lamoka points recovered from across the site dated to the Late Archaic
  - 1 point found outside the earthwork associated to the Early Woodland Kramer
- Ceramics: Five diagnostic rim sherds from ceramic vessels from outside and inside the earthwork enclosure, all grit tempered, and one single pipe bowl remnant
  - 46.9% of sherds white igneous grit
  - 68% found inside enclosure
  - No shell tempering recognized
    - Significant since shell tempering was prominent in some Michigan ceramic during the occupation period of the South Flats
- Fauna: Most of these remains were within the boundaries of the pit features inside the earthwork
  - Evidence is suggestive of meat-related activity/use in the interior portion and more densely focused around the pit features
  - No fish or bird remains recorded even though they were resources in the near vicinity
  - Mussel shells
- Flora: Hand-collected and through flotation
  - Carbonized wood makes up a large portion of the assemblage, with oak and pine being the dominant resources lines up with the pre-Columbian vegetation of this location
  - One acorn and one black walnut recovered
    - Lack of acorn creates interest as an oak forest is bound to have large quantities of it
    - Suggesting acorn was not a part of the subsistence strategy of the region
  - Lack and near absence of seeds, nuts, and other edible plants are significant as they can indicate short term usage of the site
- Copper: One single copper piece recovered
  - 2.2 mm x 1.9 mm
  - Lack of zinc places aligns this piece with pre-Columbian copper making in North America
- Charcoal: two samples of charcoal were radiocarbon dated, one from each feature
  - Feature 1 sample: 1400–1640 AD
  - Feature 2 sample: 1440–1650 AD
    - Similar dated ages indicate asynchronous use during same occupation period, the most recent end of the datings, 1650 AD, aligns the site to be from the Late Woodland and French exploration of the western Great Lakes.

== Conclusions ==
Archaeologists are yet to gather clear answers about the meaning and use of the South Flats earthwork site, although there are various hypotheses of the purpose it served. Notorious to Michigan enclosures, activities took place within the confines of the earthwork; physical evidence at South Flats showed very light usage of the facility, neither proving nor disproving said practices at this site. Analysis of floral remains no use or consumption of nuts, seeds, fruits, and domesticates, this being peculiar as amongst Michigan prehistoric populations they were widely used and relied on; indicates plant use as not a focus, supported by no traces of maize or tobacco.

Three hypotheses are introduced:

1. Lack of fish and plant use are associated with a possible winter season occupation, yet can be argued against due to the difficulty of moving dirt in an exposed landscape during winter time.
2. Patterns of male activity are present, with supporting evidence in the absence of domesticated plant remains, which is generalized as the specialty of prehistoric women.
3. Intertribal usage and trading, as other earthwork sites have been found to have been possible trading posts and/or ceremonial grounds for hunter-gatherers and horticulturalists.

Further research is needed to contextualize the South Flats site and its prehistoric functions.
