= Waneta Lake =

- Location within New York Waneta Lake (the United States)
- Location: Schuyler / Steuben counties, New York, United States
- Coordinates: 42°26′41″N 77°06′06″W
- Type: Reservoir
- Basin countries: United States
- Max. length: 3.5 mi (5.6 km)
- Surface area: 797 acres (323 ha)
- Max. depth: 29 feet (8.8 m)
- Shore length^{1}: 6.8 miles (10.9 km)
- Surface elevation: 1,099 feet (335 m)
- ^{1} Shore length is not a well-defined measure.

Waneta Lake (previously known as "Little Lake") is a small lake in the Finger Lakes region of the state of New York in the United States. The lake straddles the border of Schuyler County and Steuben County, and is within the towns of Tyrone and Wayne. Waneta Lake is 3.5 miles long (north-to-south) and half a mile wide (east-to-west), and lies just east of the southern branch of Keuka Lake. Despite its location in the Finger Lakes region, it is not counted as one of the eleven Finger Lakes.

== Fishing ==
Fish species present in the lake include chain pickerel, largemouth bass, smallmouth bass, muskellunge, common sunfish, bluegill, rock bass, black crappie, yellow perch, brown bullhead, carp, common sucker, chub sucker, and killfish. There is access via concrete ramp, located off County Route 23.

== See also ==
- Camp Gorton
- Lamoka Lake
