= Lamoka Lake =

Lake in Schuyler County, New York, United States

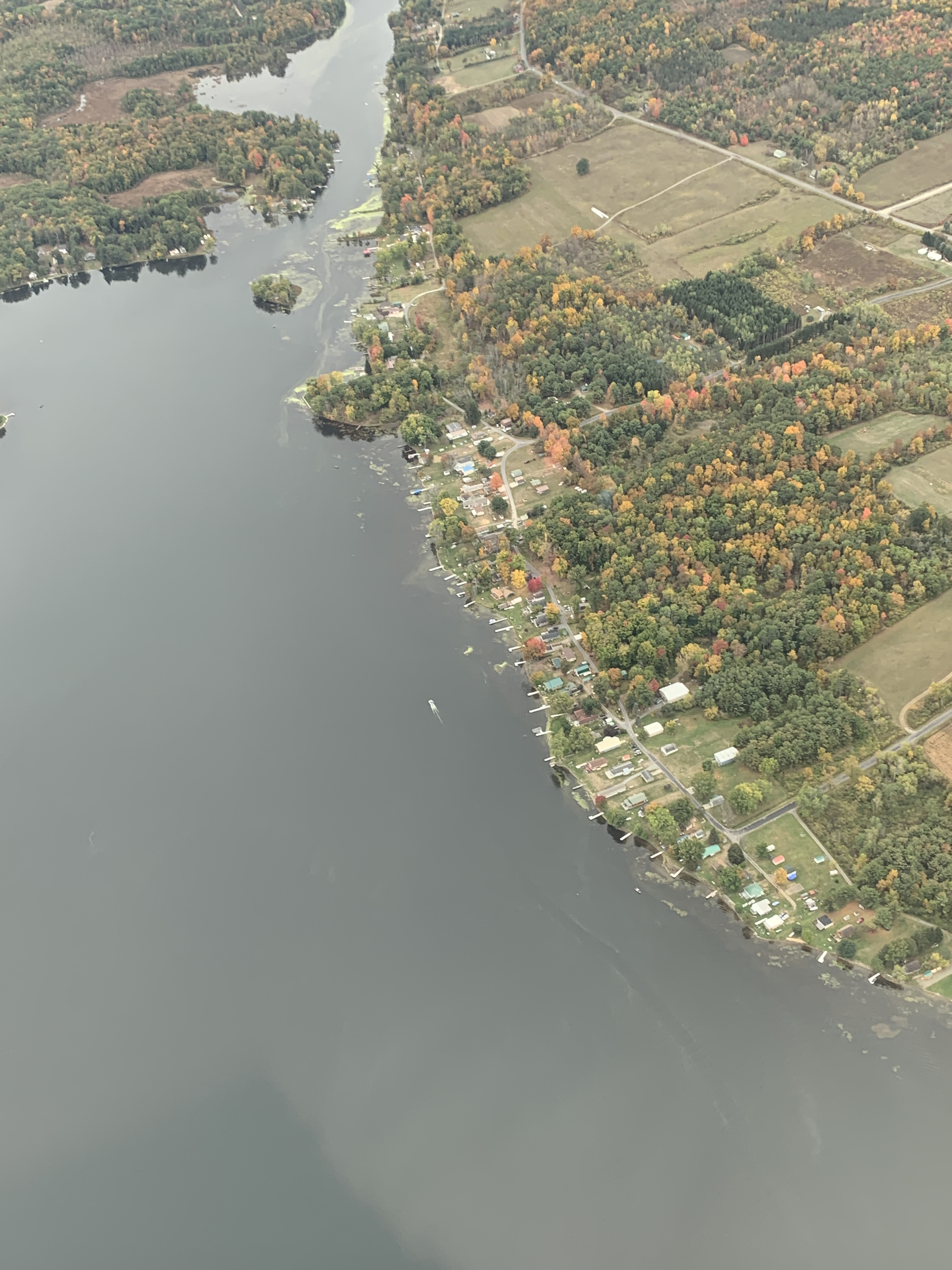
- Aerial view of Lamoka Lake

- Location within New York Location within the United States
- Location: Schuyler / Steuben counties, New York, United States
- Coordinates: 42°24′23″N 77°04′41″W
- Type: Alkaline
- Primary inflows: Waneta Lake
- Primary outflows: Mill Pond
- Basin countries: United States
- Surface area: 824 acres (3.3 km^{2})
- Max. depth: 47 ft (14 m)
- Shore length^{1}: 11.3 miles (18.2 km)
- Surface elevation: 1,100 ft (340 m)
- Islands: Red Bank Island, Weller Island
- ^{1} Shore length is not a well-defined measure.

Lamoka Lake, previously known as Mud Lake, is a small crescent-shaped lake in the western part of New York state. The lake is located at the border of Schuyler County and Steuben County. Most of the lake is in Schuyler County with only a small part, called "Mill Pond," at the southwest corner in Steuben County.

North of Lamoka Lake is another lake called Waneta Lake, previously known as "Little Lake", which is linked to Lamoka Lake by a short channel. Both Lamoka Lake and Waneta Lake are east of Keuka Lake, one of the Finger Lakes, however they are not part of the Finger Lakes drainage system. While the Finger Lakes drain north into the St. Lawrence River system, Lamoka and Waneta Lakes drain south into Mill Pond, then Mud Creek, and then to the Cohocton River in the Susquehanna River system.

The area is the location of a significant archeological site, the Lamoka site, which, according to the National Park Service, "provided the first clear evidence of an Archaic hunting and gathering culture in the Northeastern United States (c.3500 BC)". The site was designated a National Historic Landmark in 1961.

== Fishing ==
The lake is well-stocked with a variety of fish, including several species of panfish. Public boat launching ramps are available for each lake. Fish species present in the lake include pickerel, muskellunge, largemouth bass, smallmouth bass, common sunfish, bluegill, rock bass, black crappie, yellow perch, brown bullhead, and carp. There is access via a concrete ramp boat launch into the channel between Lamoka Lake and Waneta Lake, located off County Route 23.

== History ==
The Lamoka culture was a late Archaic period native culture that subsisted primarily by hunting and gathering. The Lamoka People lived in central New York and northern Pennsylvania from about 3500 to 1300 BCE.

Archaeological excavations at the Lamoka site – which was named a National Historic Landmark in 1961 – revealed that they lived part of the year in small houses. Tool survival indicates that hunting and fishing were important activities.

== Geography ==
Lamoka Lake is located at 42°24′23″N 77°04′41″W, in the Towns of Tyrone and Orange in Schuyler County, and Bradford in Steuben County. The lake is northeast of Bath and northwest of Watkins Glen.

New York State Route 226 passes close by the eastern shore of the lake.

Communities

- Bradford, Town of Bradford
- Tyrone, Town of Tyrone
- Weston, Town of Tyrone.

== Physiography ==
The surface of the lake is 1,100 feet (340 m) above sea level and the maximum depth is 40 feet (12 m). The total surface area is 824 acres (3.3 km^{2}), bounded by about eleven miles (18 km) of shoreline. The water is slightly alkaline.
