= Elijah Mattison Sharp =

American politician

Elijah Mattison Sharp (1832-1891) was a member of the Wisconsin State Assembly.

== Biography ==
Sharp was born on October 21, 1832, in Reading, New York; he moved to Delavan, Wisconsin in 1850. On September 30, 1862, Sharp married Sarah A. Williams. They had seven children. Sharp died in 1891.

== Career ==
Sharp was a member of the Assembly in 1872 and 1875. Other positions he held include Treasurer of Delavan and member of the Walworth County, Wisconsin Board of Supervisors. He was a Republican.
