= Altay, New York =

- Hamlet
- Location within the state of New York
- Coordinates: 42°25′N 77°4′W
- Country: United States
- State: New York
- County: Schuyler
- Time zone: UTC-5 (Eastern (EST))
  - Summer (DST): UTC-4 (EDT)
- Area code: 607

Altay is a hamlet in Schuyler County, New York, United States. The community is on New York State Route 226. It is in the town of Tyrone, 2.8 miles north east of the hamlet of Tyrone.
