= Montour Falls Historic District =

Historic district in New York, United States

- U.S. National Register of Historic Places
- U.S. Historic district
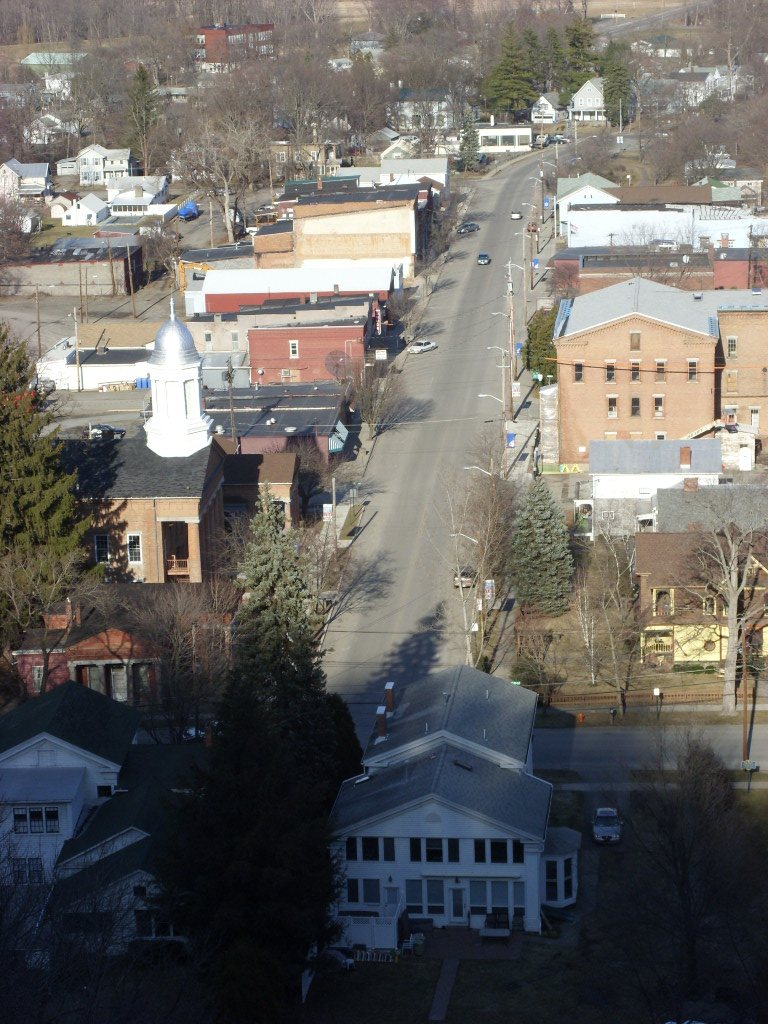
- Montour Falls Historic District, March 2009

- Location within New York Location within the United States
- Location: Main and Genesee Sts., Montour Falls, New York
- Coordinates: 42°20′41″N 76°50′58″W
- Area: 13 acres (5.3 ha)
- Built: 1853
- Architect: Gillispie & Coreyell
- Architectural style: Greek Revival, Shingle Style, Italian Villa
- NRHP reference No.: 78001911
- Added to NRHP: August 31, 1978

Montour Falls Historic District is a national historic district located at Montour Falls in Schuyler County, New York. The district includes 24 mid- and late-19th century structures. The visual focus of the district is known as the "Glorious T" around the intersection of Genesee and Main Streets. Notable structures include the Sheriff's Office, Schuyler County Clerk's Office, Montour Falls Village Hall, Montour Falls Memorial Library, and the Greek Revival style Ashton residence.

It was listed on the National Register of Historic Places in 1978.

== Gallery ==
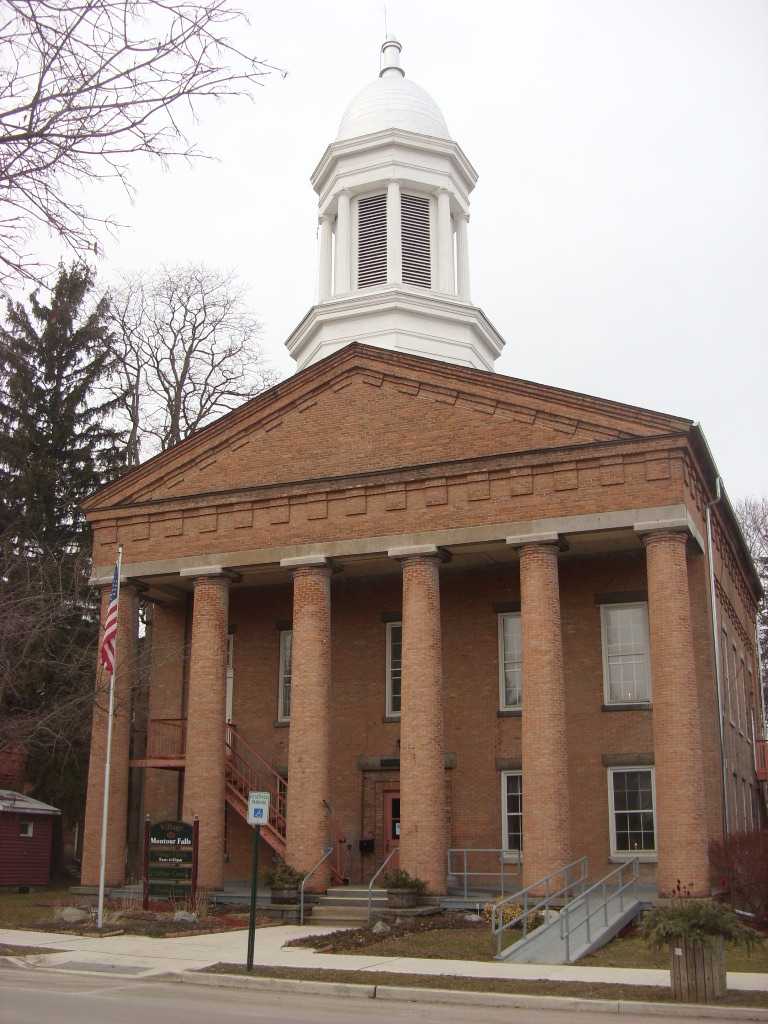
Montour Falls Village Hall, February 2009
