= Bradford, New York =

- Town
- Location within the state of New York
- Coordinates: 42°19′51″N 77°8′0″W
- Country: United States
- State: New York
- County: Steuben

Area
  - Total: 25.24 sq mi (65.36 km^{2})
  - Land: 25.12 sq mi (65.06 km^{2})
  - Water: 0.12 sq mi (0.30 km^{2})
- Elevation: 1,316 ft (401 m)

Population (2020)
  - Total: 811 ▼
  - Estimate (2021): 801
  - Density: 33.0/sq mi (12.76/km^{2})
- Time zone: UTC-5 (Eastern (EST))
  - Summer (DST): UTC-4 (EDT)
- FIPS code: 36-07740
- GNIS feature ID: 0978747

Bradford is a town in Steuben County, New York, United States. The population was 811 at the 2020 census. The town is named after Major Robert Bradford, and is located in the northeastern section of the county, north of Corning.

== History ==
The town was first settled circa 1793. The first settler was Daniel Taylor (1775 - December 3, 1851), who was interred in Sonora, N.Y. cemetery.

The town was formed from the town of Orange (then the town of Jersey) in Schuyler County in 1836.

== Geography ==
According to the United States Census Bureau, the town has a total area of 24.9 square miles (64 km^{2}), of which 24.8 square miles (64 km^{2}) is land and 0.04 square miles (0.10 km^{2}) (0.16%) is water.

The eastern town line is the border of Schuyler County (town of Orange). A part of Lamoka Lake, called Mill Pond, is within the eastern town line.

New York State Route 226 traverses the town from east-to-west.

== Demographics ==
Historical population
Census	Pop.	Note	%±
1840	1,547		—
1850	2,010		29.9%
1860	1,211		−39.8%
1870	1,080		−10.8%
1880	937		−13.2%
1890	765		−18.4%
1900	771		0.8%
1910	613		−20.5%
1920	570		−7.0%
1930	507		−11.1%
1940	486		−4.1%
1950	510		4.9%
1960	558		9.4%
1970	630		12.9%
1980	724		14.9%
1990	699		−3.5%
2000	763		9.2%
2010	855		12.1%
2020	811		−5.1%
2021 (est.)	801		−1.2%
U.S. Decennial Census

As of the census of 2000, there were 763 people, 198 households, and 211 families residing in the town. The population density was 30.7 inhabitants per square mile (11.9/km^{2}). There were 1 housing units at an average density of 13.6 per square mile (5.3/km^{2}). The racial makeup of the town was 98.82% white, .13% African American, .66% Native American, .13% Asian, and .26% from two or more races. Hispanic or Latino of any race were .26% of the population.

There were 288 households, out of which 34.7% had children under the age of 18 living with them, 51.4% were married couples living together, 11.1% had a female householder with no husband present, and 31.3% were non-families. 21.2% of all households were made up of individuals, and 8.7% had someone living alone who was 65 years of age or older. The average household size was 2.64 and the average family size was 3.09.

In the town, the population was spread out, with 27.8% under the age of 18, 6.2% from 18 to 24, 30.9% from 25 to 44, 26.0% from 45 to 64, and 9.2% who were 65 years of age or older. The median age was 36 years. For every 100 females, there were 103.5 males. For every 100 females age 18 and over, there were 101.8 males.

The median income for a household in the town was $35,417, and the median income for a family was $39,107. Males had a median income of $28,750 versus $25,313 for females. The per capita income for the town was $14,848. About 12.1% of families and 16.4% of the population were below the poverty line, including 19.9% of those under age 18 and 10.3% of those age 65 or over.

== Communities and locations in the town of Bradford ==
- Bradford – A hamlet in the northeastern part of the town on County Road 16. The community is located near the end of a small lake called Mill Pond, which is partly in the town and is the southern end of Lamoka Lake.
- Mud Creek – A stream flowing into Mill Pond by Bradford hamlet.
- South Bradford – A hamlet in the south central part of the town at the junction of County Roads 17 and 18.
