= New York State Route 226 =

Highway in New York

New York State Route 226
- Map of Finger Lakes region in the Southern Tier of New York with NY 226 highlighted in red

Route information
- Maintained by NYSDOT
- Length: 19.03 mi (30.63 km)
- Existed: 1930–present

Major junctions
- South end: I-86 / NY 17 / Southern Tier Expressway near Savona
- North end: NY 14A in Reading

Location
- Country: United States
- State: New York
- Counties: Steuben, Schuyler

Highway system
- New York Highways; Interstate; US; State; Reference; Parkways
← NY 225	→ NY 227

New York State Route 226 (NY 226) is a 19.03-mile-long (30.63 km) north–south state highway in the Finger Lakes region of New York in the United States. The southern terminus of the route is at an interchange with the Southern Tier Expressway (Interstate 86 and NY 17) just west of the Savona village line in the town of Bath. Its northern terminus is at an intersection with NY 14A in the town of Reading.

== Route description ==
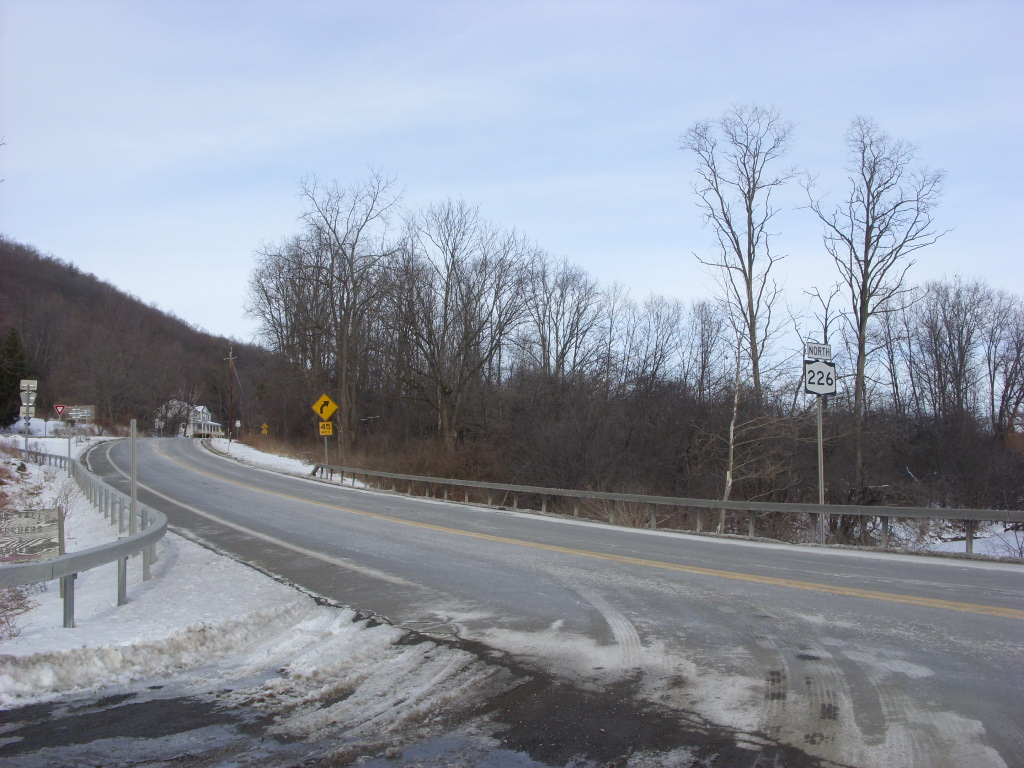
NY 226 proceeding northward through Schuyler County

NY 226 begins at an intersection with the off-ramps from interchange 40 on the Southern Tier Expressway (I-86 / NY 17) in the town of Bath. An eastward continuation of County Route 12 (CR 12), the two routes are concurrent for a short distance, crossing under the expressway as West Lamoka Avenue. NY 226 and CR 12 cross Mud Creek and enter the village of Savona, where CR 12 terminates, and NY 226 continues eastward as a four-lane arterial. After crossing the village line, NY 226 intersects with NY 415 (Coopers–Bath Road). Changing cardinal directions, NY 226 proceeds east as a two-lane residential street, East Lamoka Avenue. Running along the northern end of the village, NY 226 proceeds east along Mud Creek, before turning northeast, becoming a two-lane rural roadway.

A short distance later, NY 226 leaves Savona for the town of Bath once again, dropping the Lamoka Avenue moniker and running along Mud Creek to the northeast. The route remains primarily rural, passing Peterson and Van Keuren Lakes, entering the hamlet of Sonora. Through Sonora, NY 226 remains rural, passing a few residences near an intersection with the northern terminus of CR 18 (Sonora–South Bradford Road). After Sonora, NY 226 enters the town of Bradford, where it continues northeast as a two-lane rural roadway. A short distance later, NY 226 begins a parallel with CR 16 (Telegraph Road), the latter of which enters the hamlet of Bradford. NY 226 however remains to the south and crosses the Schuyler County line, entering the town of Orange.

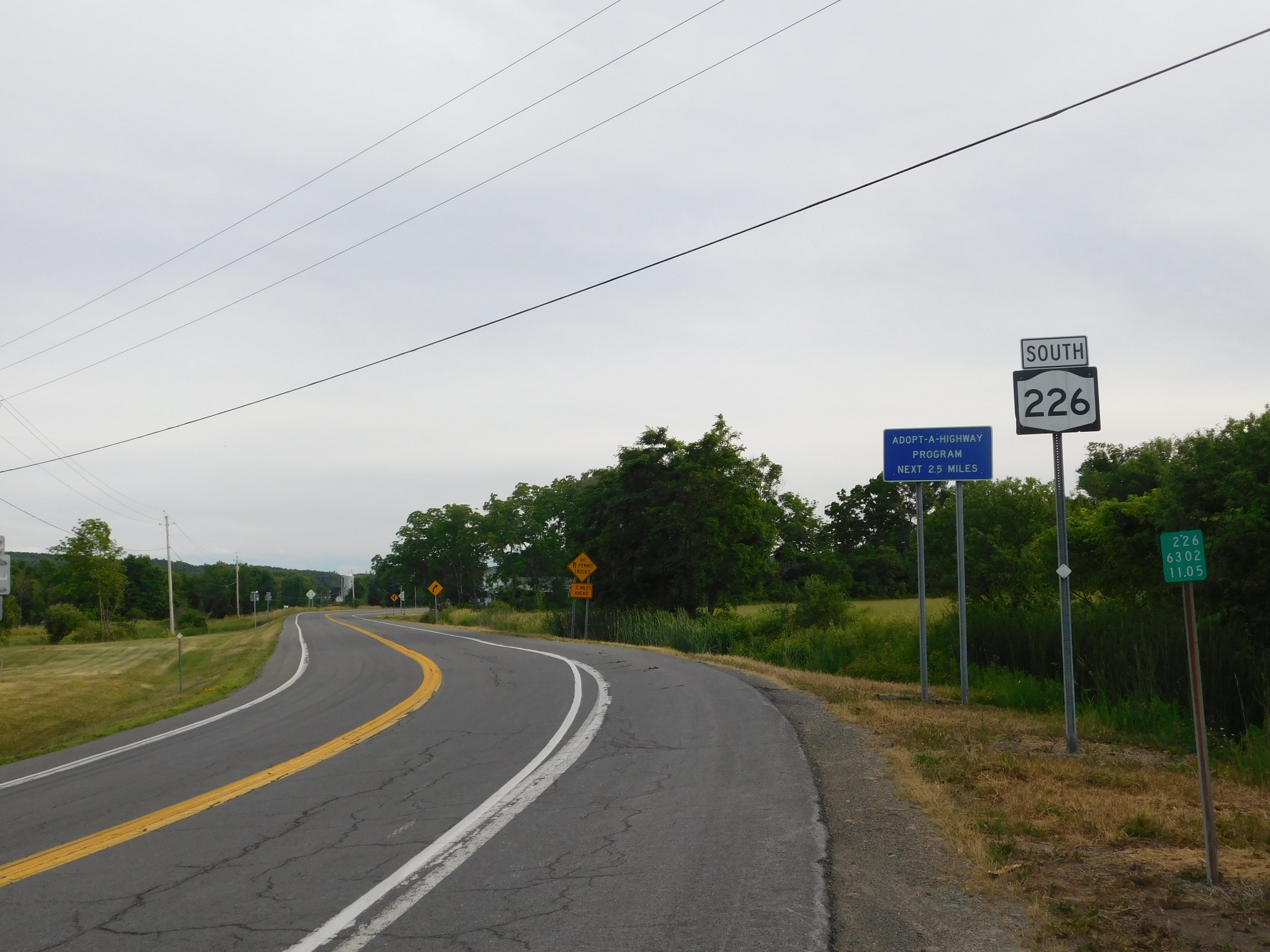
NY 226 south of its northern terminus at NY 14A in Reading

After crossing into Schuyler County, NY 226 continues northeast, passing south of Mill Pond as a two-lane rural roadway. The route continues a northeastern wind for several miles through Schuyler County, entering the town of Tyrone, where it intersects with the western terminus of CR 22 a short distance from the shore of Lamoka Lake. NY 226 continues northward, intersecting with CR 23A, and a short distance later, CR 23 (Mud Lake Road). NY 226 continues north through Tyrone, running alongside a pond before bending east at an intersection with Kendall Hill Road. After the change in direction, NY 226 enters the hamlet of Altay. Through Altay, NY 226 is a two-lane residential street before leaving just after Bigelow Hill Road.

Continuing through Tyrone, NY 226 bends northeast at a fork with Altay Road. NY 226 continues this northeastern progression from Altay, crossing Pre-Emption Road at-grade. By this point, the route has entered the town of Reading as a two-lane rural roadway. After a bend to the north, CR 27 terminates at NY 226, which continues north a short distance before terminating itself at an intersection with NY 14A near the Yates County line.

== History ==
NY 226 was assigned as part of the 1930 renumbering of state highways in New York to the portion of its modern alignment northeast of Savona. The portion of the Southern Tier Expressway near Savona and south of exit 40 was built in the late 1960s and completed by 1971. U.S. Route 15, at the time the designation for the highway, left the expressway at its end west of Savona and followed West Lamoka Avenue into the village to rejoin its original alignment in the center of Savona. An extension of the expressway northward from Savona was open by 1973 and became part of a realigned US 15. The portion of West Lamoka Avenue from exit 40 to Coopers–Bath Road in Savona became part of an extended NY 226 on July 1, 1974.

== Major intersections ==
County	Location	mi	km	Destinations	Notes
Steuben	Savona	0.00	0.00	I-86 / NY 17 / Southern Tier Expressway – Binghamton, Jamestown	Southern terminus, exit 40 (I-86 / NY 17)
Steuben	Savona	0.29	0.47	NY 415 (Coopers–Bath Road)	
Schuyler	Reading	19.03	30.63	NY 14A	Northern terminus
1.000 mi = 1.609 km; 1.000 km = 0.621 mi
