= Reading, New York =

- Town
- Location within the state of New York
- Coordinates: 42°25′2″N 76°55′0″W
- Country: United States
- State: New York
- County: Schuyler

Area
  - Total: 27.15 sq mi (70.32 km^{2})
  - Land: 27.15 sq mi (70.32 km^{2})
  - Water: 0 sq mi (0.00 km^{2})
- Elevation: 1,391 ft (424 m)

Population (2020)
  - Total: 1,719
  - Estimate (2022): 1,692
  - Density: 63.3/sq mi (24.45/km^{2})
- Time zone: UTC-5 (Eastern (EST))
  - Summer (DST): UTC-4 (EDT)
- FIPS code: 36-60763
- GNIS feature ID: 0979409
- Website: https://townofreadingny.org/

Reading is a town in Schuyler County, New York, United States. The population was 1,719 at the 2020 census.

The Town of Reading is in the northern part of the county and is east of Bath.

== History ==
The first pioneers arrived circa 1798, while the first tavern opened in 1801.

The town was formed from the Town of Wayne in 1806 while still part of Steuben County. Part of Reading was used to form the Town of Starkey (now in Yates County) in 1824. Reading became part of Steuben County's contribution to the newly formed Schuyler County in 1854.

== Geography ==
According to the United States Census Bureau, the town has a total area of 27.2 square miles (70 km^{2}), all land.

The northern town line is the border of Yates County. The town is northwest of Watkins Glen.

New York State Route 14 is a major north-south highway that parallels nearby Seneca Lake, which marks the eastern town line. New York State Route 14A intersects New York State Route 226 in the northwestern part of the town at Coles Corners.

== Demographics ==
Historical population
| Census | Pop. | Note | %± |
|---|---|---|---|
| 1820 | 3,062 | | — |
| 1830 | 1,568 | | −48.8% |
| 1840 | 1,541 | | −1.7% |
| 1850 | 1,434 | | −6.9% |
| 1860 | 1,453 | | 1.3% |
| 1870 | 1,751 | | 20.5% |
| 1880 | 1,581 | | −9.7% |
| 1890 | 1,386 | | −12.3% |
| 1900 | 1,335 | | −3.7% |
| 1910 | 1,318 | | −1.3% |
| 1920 | 1,106 | | −16.1% |
| 1930 | 1,257 | | 13.7% |
| 1940 | 1,205 | | −4.1% |
| 1950 | 1,373 | | 13.9% |
| 1960 | 1,410 | | 2.7% |
| 1970 | 1,768 | | 25.4% |
| 1980 | 1,813 | | 2.5% |
| 1990 | 1,810 | | −0.2% |
| 2000 | 1,786 | | −1.3% |
| 2010 | 1,707 | | −4.4% |
| 2020 | 1,719 | | 0.7% |
| 2022 (est.) | 1,692 | | −1.6% |
U.S. Decennial Census

As of the census of 2000, there were 1,786 people, 700 households, and 520 families residing in the town. The population density was 65.6 inhabitants per square mile (25.3/km^{2}). There were 868 housing units at an average density of 31.9 per square mile (12.3/km^{2}). The racial makeup of the town was 97.26% White, 0.90% African American, 0.39% Native American, 0.39% Asian, 0.06% Pacific Islander, 0.06% from other races, and 0.95% from two or more races. Hispanic or Latino of any race were 0.50% of the population.

There were 700 households, out of which 29.3% had children under the age of 18 living with them, 62.1% were married couples living together, 8.7% had a female householder with no husband present, and 25.7% were non-families. 20.9% of all households were made up of individuals, and 9.9% had someone living alone who was 65 years of age or older. The average household size was 2.55 and the average family size was 2.94.

In the town, the population was spread out, with 23.7% under the age of 18, 6.8% from 18 to 24, 25.1% from 25 to 44, 27.9% from 45 to 64, and 16.5% who were 65 years of age or older. The median age was 41 years. For every 100 females, there were 99.3 males. For every 100 females age 18 and over, there were 96.1 males.

The median income for a household in the town was $38,618, and the median income for a family was $43,681. Males had a median income of $32,963 versus $22,404 for females. The per capita income for the town was $17,814. About 4.2% of families and 7.7% of the population were below the poverty line, including 12.3% of those under age 18 and 1.4% of those age 65 or over.

== Notable people ==
- John T. Andrews, former US Congressman
- Ralph Henry Gabriel, historian and writer
- Elijah Mattison Sharp, former Wisconsin State Assemblyman

== Communities and locations in the Town of Reading ==
- Chapmans Corners – A location in the western part of the town at the junction of County Roads 23 and 27.
- Coles Corners – A location in the northwestern corner of the town, north of North Reading.
- Gabriels Junction – A hamlet at the intersection of NY-14 and NY-14A.
- Halls Corners – A location at the western town line.
- Irelandville – A hamlet in the southeastern part of Reading.
- North Reading – A hamlet in the northwestern corner of the town.
- Reading Center – A hamlet near the town center on NY-14A.
- Reading Center Station – A location southeast of Reading Center.
- Salt Point – A projection into Seneca Lake north of Watkins Glen.
- Scout Point – A projection into Seneca Lake north of Gabriels Junction.
- Watkins Glen – A small part of the Village of Watkins Glen is in the southeastern corner of Reading.
