= Brick Tavern Stand =

Historic commercial building in New York, United States

- U.S. National Register of Historic Places
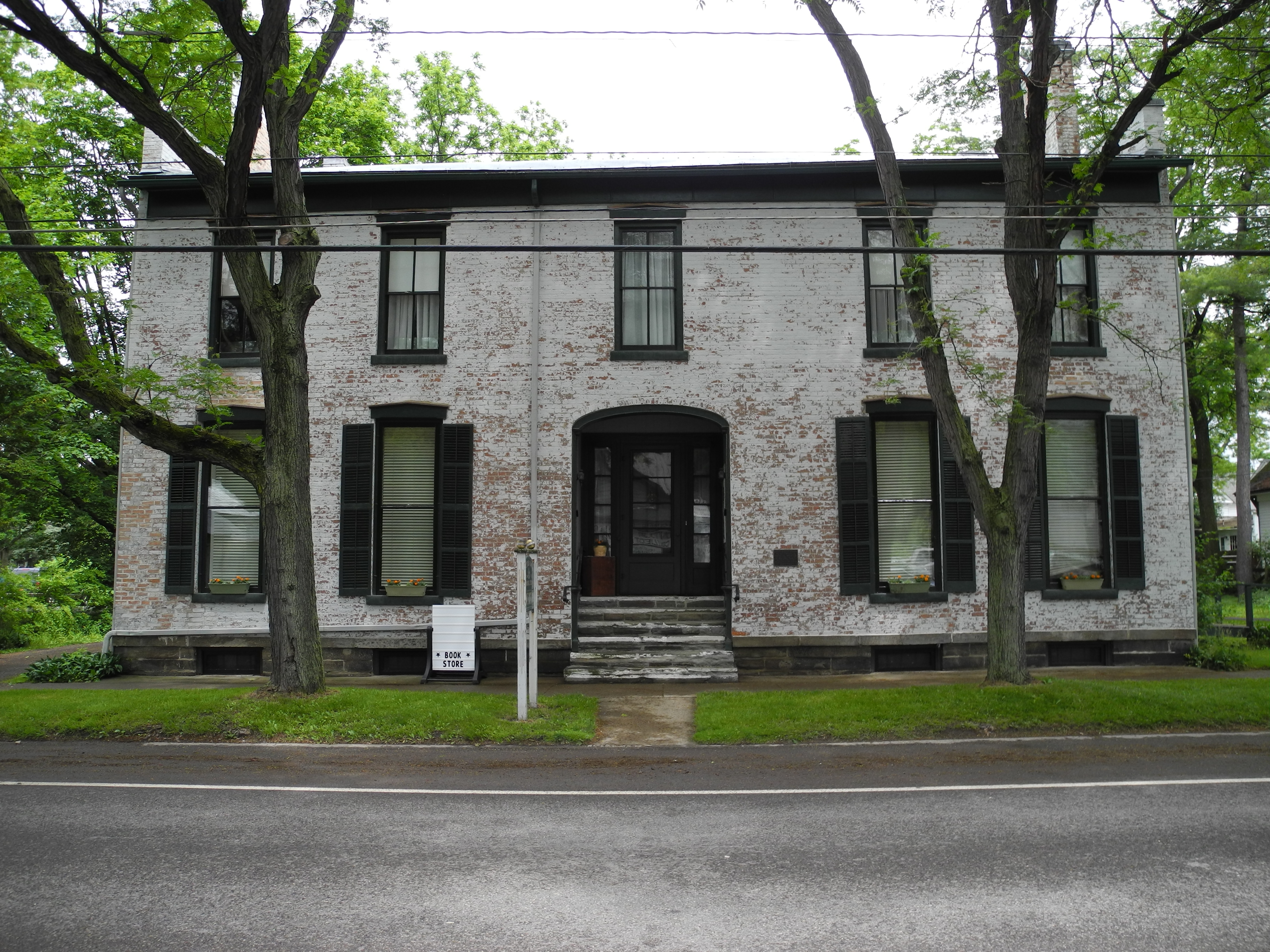
- The Brick Tavern Stand, now the Schuyler County Historical Society

- Location within New York Location within the United States
- Location: 108 Catharine St., Montour Falls, New York
- Coordinates: 42°20′51″N 76°50′43″W
- Area: 0.4 acres (0.16 ha)
- Built: 1828
- Architectural style: Federal
- NRHP reference No.: 94001283
- Added to NRHP: November 04, 1994

Brick Tavern Stand, also known as Clawson House, is a historic inn and tavern located at Montour Falls in Schuyler County, New York. It was built in 1828 and is a two-story, five bay Federal style brick structure featuring a recessed entrance. Built originally as a tavern on the stagecoach lines of the Finger Lakes Region, it was later modified for use as Bethesda Sanitorium and operated by Dr. Charles Deland Clawson. In 1974, it became home to the Schuyler County Historical Society.

It was listed on the National Register of Historic Places on November 4, 1994.
