= Lamoka projectile point =

Stone projectile points manufactured by Native Americans

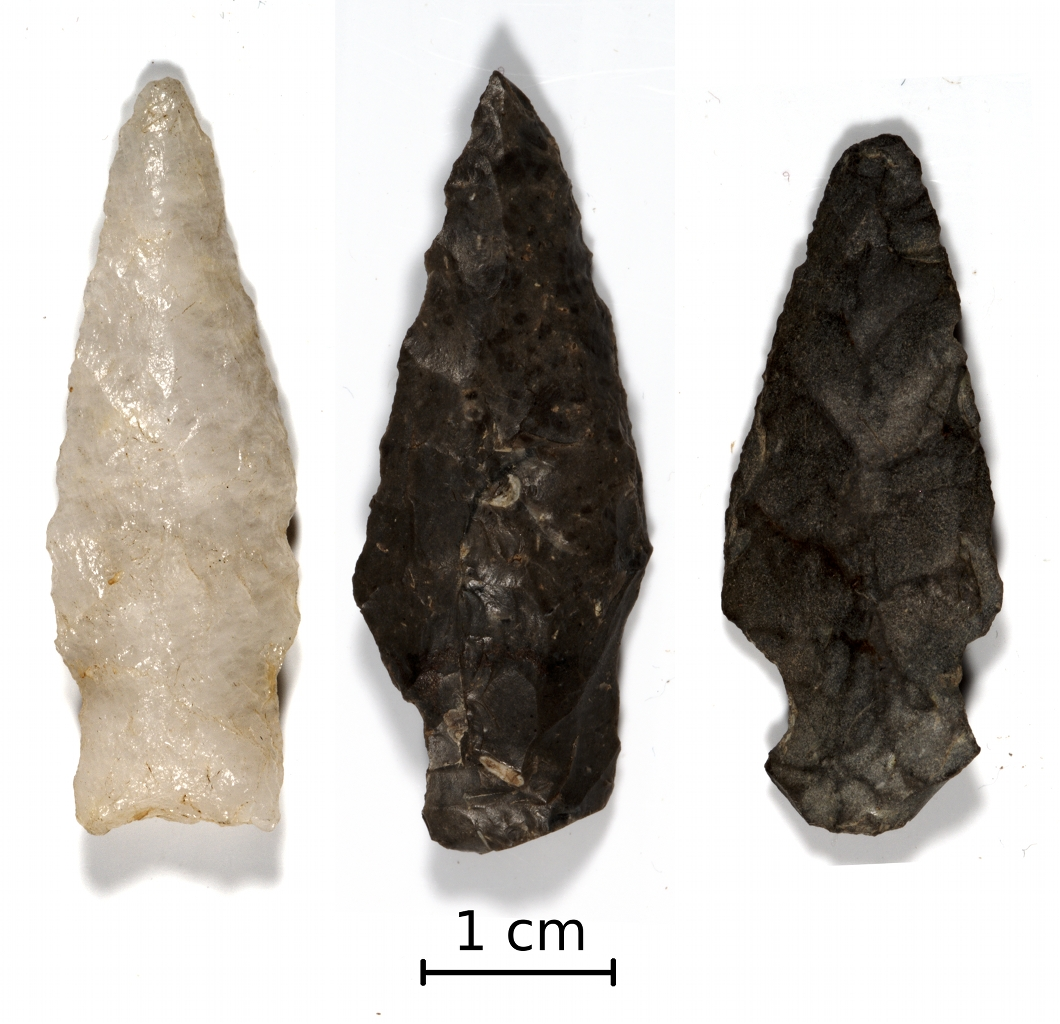
Lamoka projectile points from central New York State. The point on the left is a "stemmed" lamoka point made of quartz. The middle one is a "stemmed" lamoka point made of flint and, the point on the right is a flint "side notched" lamoka point.

Lamoka projectile points are stone projectile points manufactured by Native Americans what is now the Northeastern United States, generally in the time interval of 3500-2500 B.C. They predate the invention of the bow and arrow, and are therefore not true "arrowheads", but rather atlatl dart points. They derive their name from the specimens found at the Lamoka site in Schuyler County, New York.

== Description ==
Lamoka points sizes range in length from less than 1 in (2.5 cm) to 2.5 in (6.4 cm) with an average of about 1.5 in (3.8 cm). They are narrow and thick, with straight or slightly notched stems. The base is thick and this is diagnostic for the Lamoka point. They are two to three times longer than they are wide. They are generally made from local flints, jasper, quartz and quartzite. There are a number of varieties, the most common being the "stemmed" type with straight stems.

== Age and cultural affiliations ==
They have mostly been dated to around 3500-2500 BC, but the type persists in small numbers up to about 1000 A.D. The archaic points are associated with the Lamoka culture.

== Distribution ==
These points are generally found in the American northeast (New York and Pennsylvania; a very similar "Dustin point" is found as far west as Michigan) and central Canada (Ontario).

== See also ==
- Other projectile points
