= Montour Falls Union Grammar School =

- U.S. National Register of Historic Places
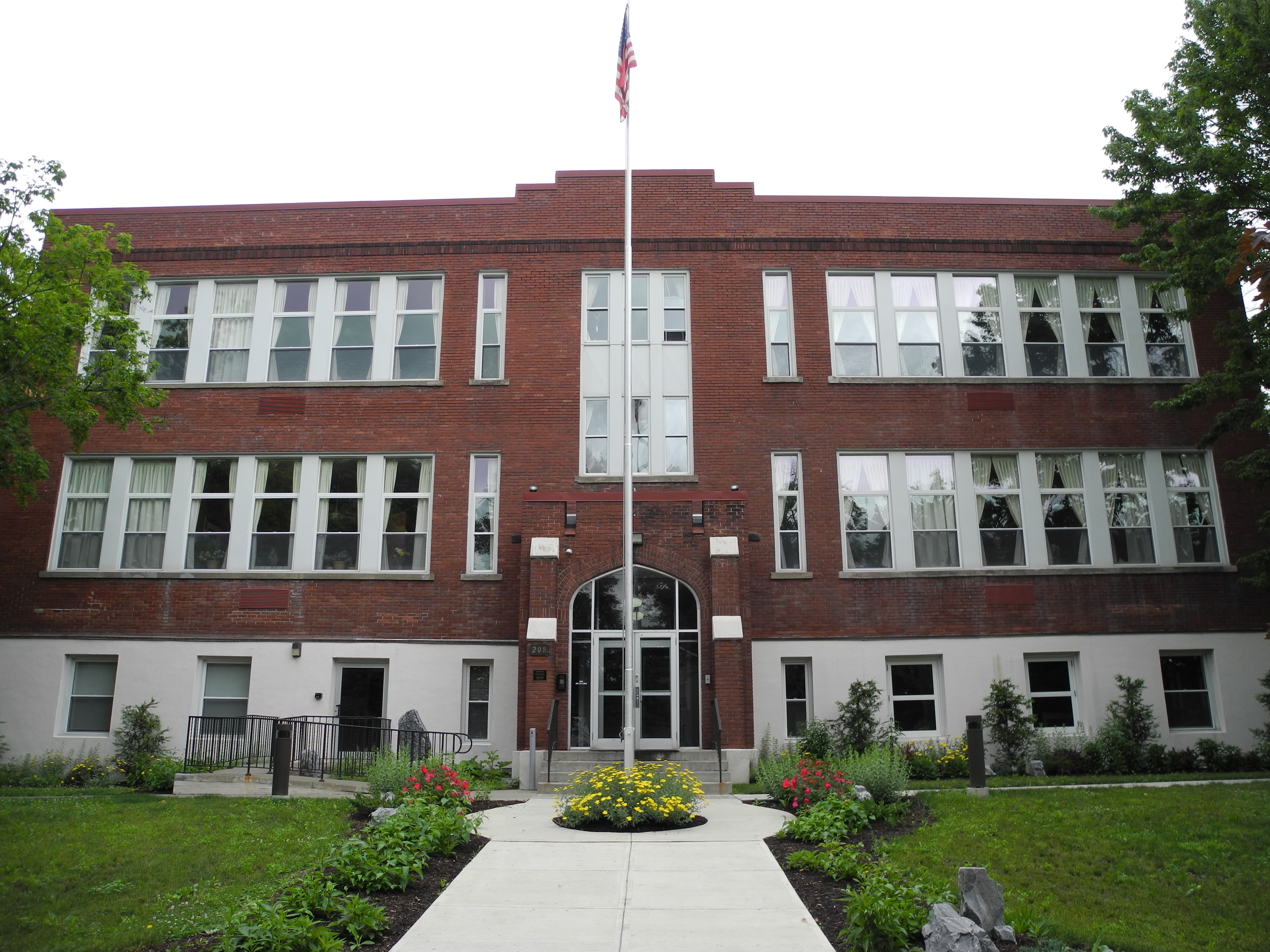
- Montour Falls Union Grammar School, June 2013

- Location within New York Location within the United States
- Location: 208 W. Broadway, Montour Falls, New York
- Coordinates: 42°20′58″N 76°50′36″W
- Area: 3.7 acres (1.5 ha)
- Built: 1921
- Built by: Driscoll Brothers & Co.
- Architect: Barton, George F.
- Architectural style: Classical Revival
- NRHP reference No.: 12000983
- Added to NRHP: November 28, 2012

Montour Falls Union Grammar School is a historic elementary school building located at Montour Falls in Schuyler County, New York. It was built in 1929, and is a two-story, T-shaped, Classical Revival style steel frame and brick building over a full basement. It features a Collegiate Gothic Tudor-arched opening flanked by buttresses and a stepped parapet. The school was closed in 1965, and has been rehabilitated into apartments and a day care. In 1965, the property was subsequently taken over by the County and has been known as the Rural Urban Center, housing County offices until 2008. It has been lovingly restored to include eight residential units and professional spaces. Nevertheless, it was listed on the National Register of Historic Places in 2015.
