= Savona, New York =

- Village
- Location within the state of New York
- Coordinates: 42°17′7″N 77°13′8″W
- Country: United States
- State: New York
- County: Steuben

Area
  - Total: 1.04 sq mi (2.69 km^{2})
  - Land: 1.04 sq mi (2.69 km^{2})
  - Water: 0 sq mi (0.00 km^{2})
- Elevation: 1,053 ft (321 m)

Population (2020)
  - Total: 672
  - Density: 646.4/sq mi (249.58/km^{2})
- Time zone: UTC-5 (Eastern (EST))
  - Summer (DST): UTC-4 (EDT)
- ZIP code: 14879
- Area code: 607
- FIPS code: 36-65354
- GNIS feature ID: 0964516

Savona is a village in Steuben County, New York, United States. As of the 2020 census, Savona had a population of 672. The village is named after Savona in Italy, and is located in the eastern part of the town of Bath. The village is located at the intersection of routes 226 and 415, and Interstate 86.

== History ==
The name "Mud Creek" was associated with the village in the 19th century. The village was incorporated in 1883.

Unwanted attention was brought to the village in 1993 by the slaying of four-year-old Derrick Robie by thirteen-year-old Eric Smith. He was the youngest defendant in state history to be tried as an adult.

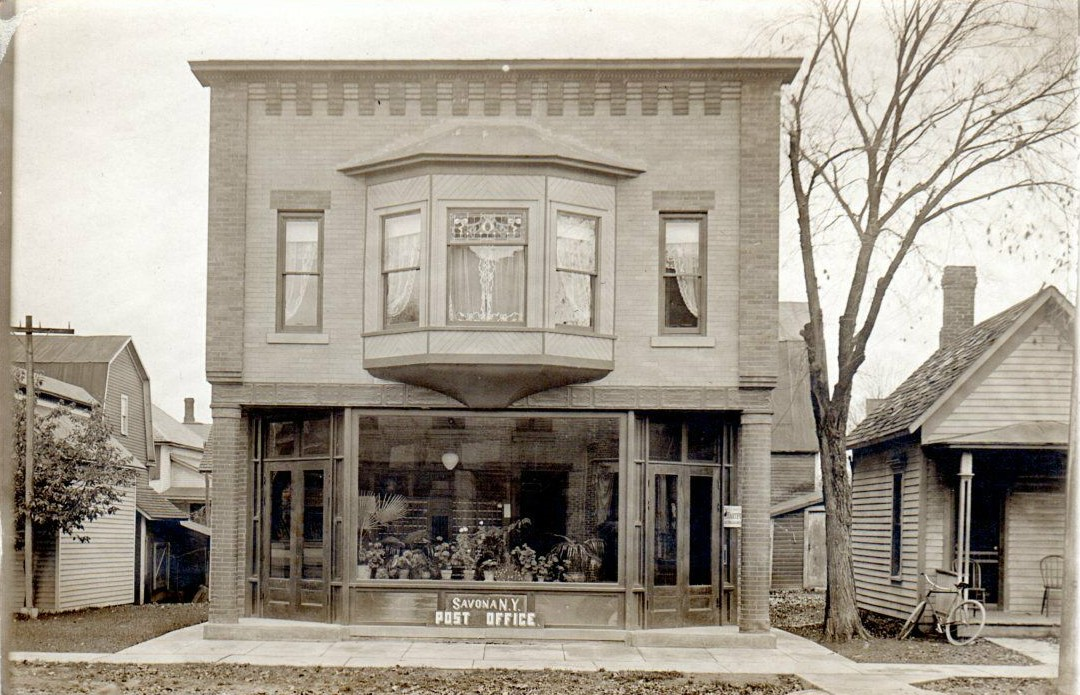
Savona, New York store on real photo postcard

== Geography ==
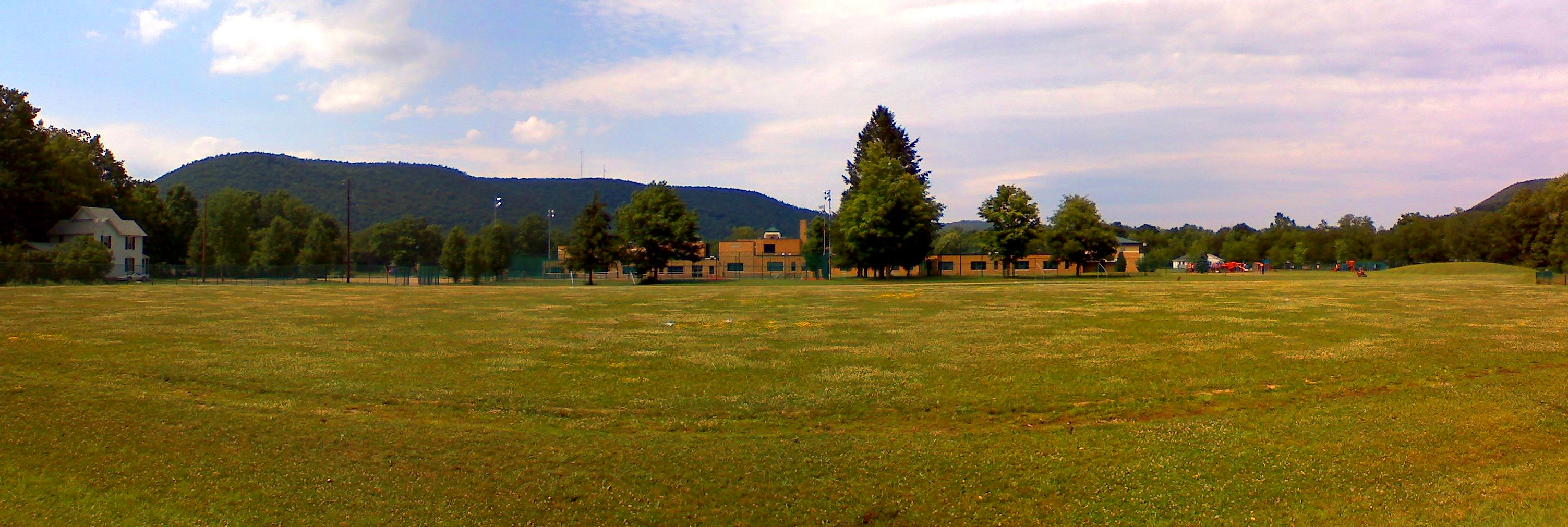
Village Park in Savona

Savona is located at 42°17′7″N 77°13′8″W (42.285283, -77.218814).

According to the United States Census Bureau, the village has a total area of 1.0 square mile (2.6 km^{2}), all land.

The village lies next to the Cohocton River at the confluence of Mud Creek, and is at the intersection of state routes 226 and 415.

Sanford Lake is a small lake north of the village.

== Demographics ==
Historical population
Census	Pop.	Note	%±
1880	447		—
1890	569		27.3%
1900	611		7.4%
1910	587		−3.9%
1920	516		−12.1%
1930	545		5.6%
1940	653		19.8%
1950	869		33.1%
1960	904		4.0%
1970	933		3.2%
1980	932		−0.1%
1990	974		4.5%
2000	822		−15.6%
2010	827		0.6%
2020	672		−18.7%
U.S. Decennial Census

At the 2000 census there were 822 people, 317 households, and 230 families in the village. The population density was 786.5 inhabitants per square mile (303.7/km^{2}). There were 339 housing units at an average density of 324.4 per square mile (125.3/km^{2}). The racial makeup of the village was 98.54% White, 0.49% Native American, 0.12% Asian, 0.24% from other races, and 0.61% from two or more races. Hispanic or Latino of any race were 0.61%.

Of the 317 households 36.0% had children under the age of 18 living with them, 47.9% were married couples living together, 16.1% had a female householder with no husband present, and 27.4% were non-families. 23.0% of households were one person and 10.1% were one person aged 65 or older. The average household size was 2.59 and the average family size was 2.97.

The age distribution was 27.5% under the age of 18, 8.9% from 18 to 24, 28.1% from 25 to 44, 25.3% from 45 to 64, and 10.2% 65 or older. The median age was 35 years. For every 100 females, there were 93.4 males. For every 100 females age 18 and over, there were 89.2 males.

The median household income was $33,182 and the median family income was $39,018. Males had a median income of $30,893 versus $20,156 for females. The per capita income for the village was $15,194. About 10.5% of families and 13.9% of the population were below the poverty line, including 22.0% of those under age 18 and 2.1% of those age 65 or over.

== Notable people ==
- Eric Smith (born 1980), convicted murderer
