= Second Baptist Church of Wayne =

Historic church in New York, United States

- Wayne Village Baptist Church
- U.S. National Register of Historic Places
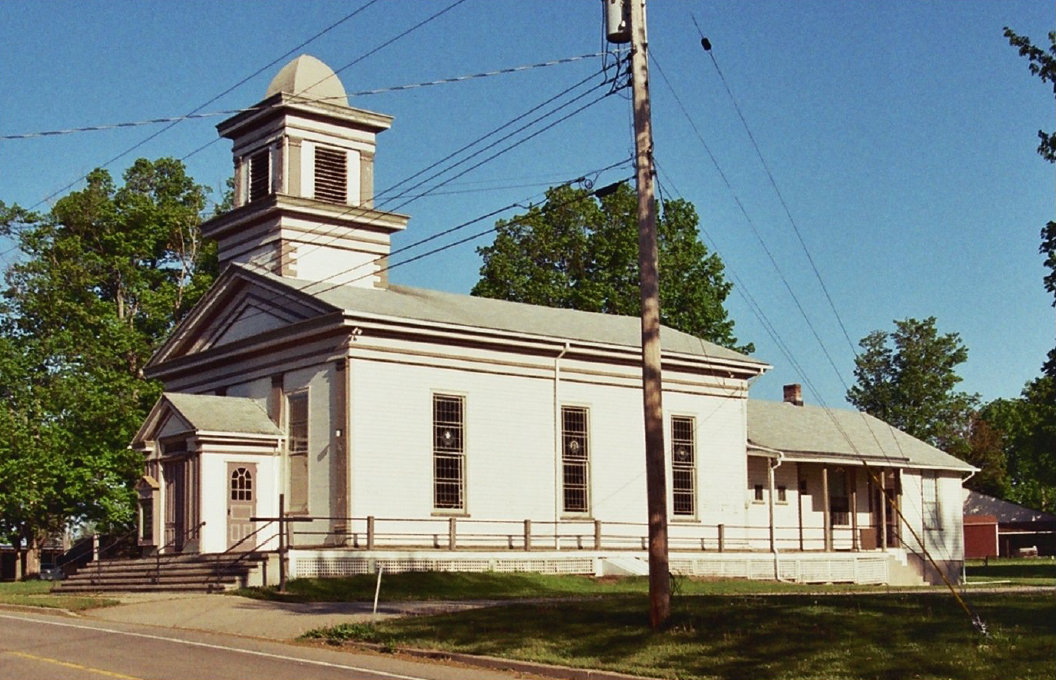

- Location within New York Location within the United States
- Location: 69 NY 230, Wayne, New York
- Coordinates: 42°28′17″N 77°06′10″W
- Area: Less than 1 acre (0.40 ha)
- Built: 1846, 1876, 1921, 1972
- Built by: Sunderlin, Daniel
- Architectural style: Greek Revival
- NRHP reference No.: 14001021
- Added to NRHP: December 10, 2014

Second Baptist Church of Wayne, also known as the Wayne Village Baptist Church, is a historic Baptist church located at Wayne in Schuyler County, New York. It was built in 1846, and is a Greek Revival style frame church. It has a temple front and two single story additions dating from 1876 / 1921 and 1972. It features a projecting vestibule and a two-stage, domed bell tower contains the original bell cast in 1846.

It was listed on the National Register of Historic Places in 2014.
