= Weston Schoolhouse =

- U.S. National Register of Historic Places
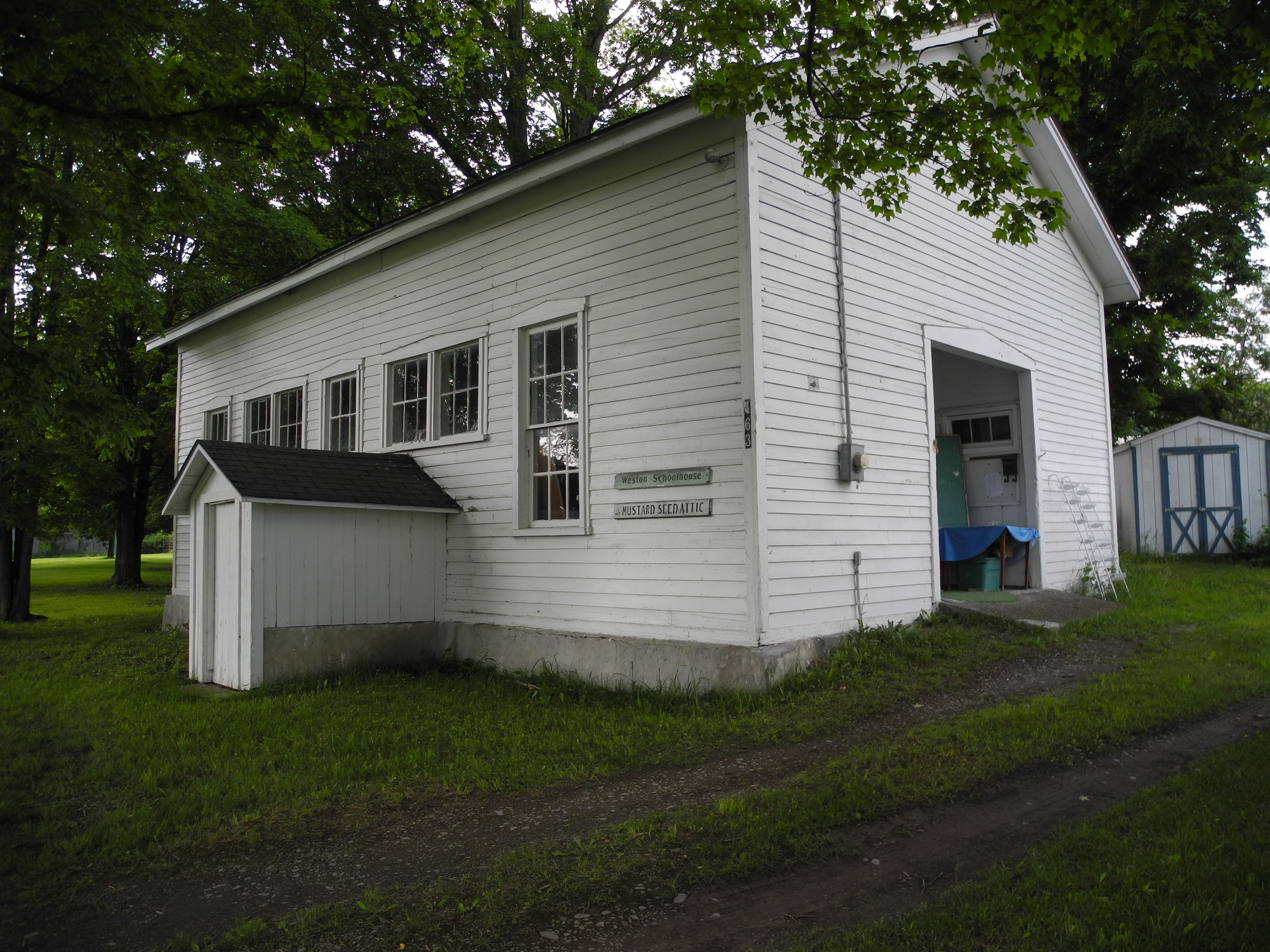

- Location within New York Location within the United States
- Location: 463 Cty Rte 23, Weston, New York
- Coordinates: 42°25′19.3″N 77°4′36.5″W
- Area: less than one acre
- Built: 1870
- Architectural style: Late 19th century vernacular
- NRHP reference No.: 98001241
- Added to NRHP: October 08, 1998

Weston Schoolhouse is a historic one-room school building located at Weston in Schuyler County, New York. It is a one-room, one story, gable roofed frame building built about 1870. It was used as a school until 1940.

It was listed on the National Register of Historic Places in 1998.
