= Montour Falls, New York =

- Village
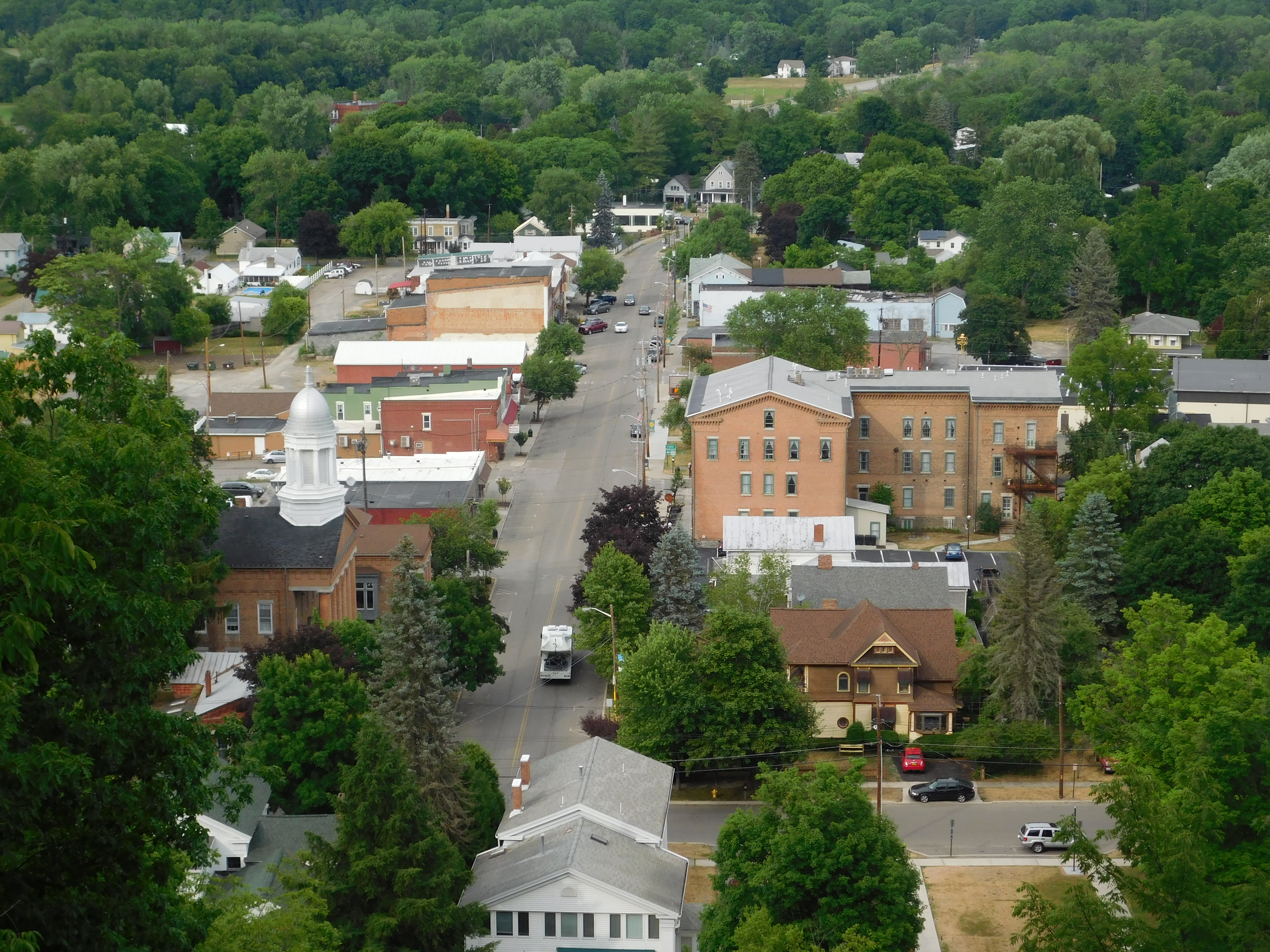
- Downtown Montour Falls as seen from Mill Street above Shequaga Falls.

- Location within the state of New York
- Coordinates: 42°20′57″N 76°50′47″W
- Country: United States
- State: New York
- County: Schuyler

Area
  - Total: 3.03 sq mi (7.85 km^{2})
  - Land: 3.01 sq mi (7.79 km^{2})
  - Water: 0.023 sq mi (0.06 km^{2})
- Elevation: 449 ft (137 m)

Population (2020)
  - Total: 1,635
  - Density: 543.5/sq mi (209.84/km^{2})
- Time zone: UTC-5 (Eastern (EST))
  - Summer (DST): UTC-4 (EDT)
- ZIP code: 14865
- Area code: 607
- FIPS code: 36-48197
- GNIS feature ID: 0974235
- Website: Village website

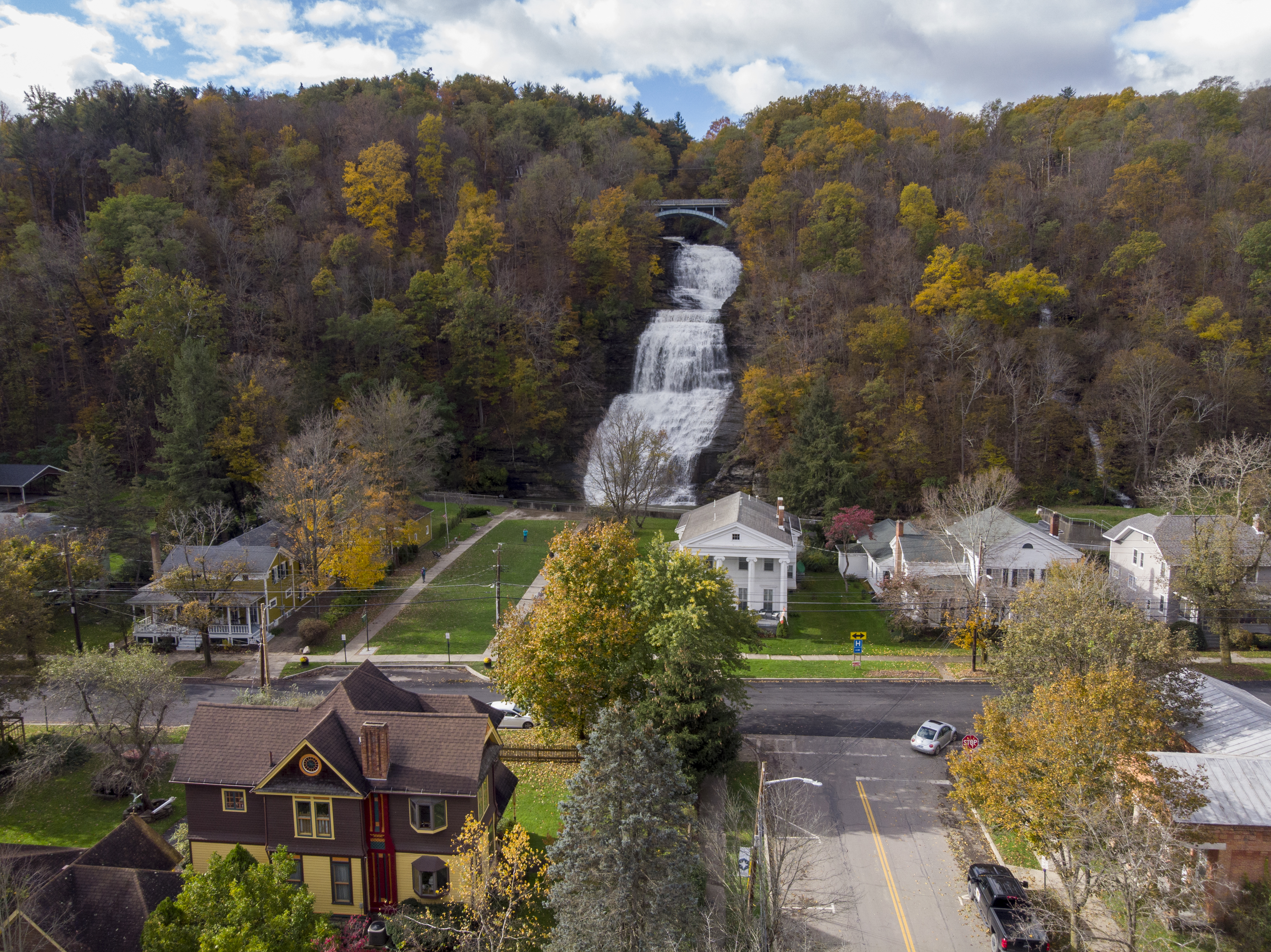
Shequaga Falls in Montour Falls, New York, in November 2021.

Montour Falls is a village located in Schuyler County, New York, United States. The population was 2,714 at the time of the 2020 census. A waterfall at the end of West Main Street gives the village its name. The name "Montour" is derived from Queen Catharine Montour, a prominent Seneca woman who lived at the village site in the 18th century.

The boundaries defining the Village of Montour Falls occur mostly within the Town of Montour, but a small part lies within the Town of Dix. The village is located approximately twenty miles north of Elmira, New York and three miles south of Watkins Glen, New York. The New York State Academy of Fire Science is located in the village.

== History ==
The modern day Village of Montour Falls is developed on the site of a former Seneca village, Queanettquaga, informally known as Catherine's Town after a prominent Seneca resident and leader, Catherine Montour. Montour's father, Peter Quebec, was a Mohawk Chief, and her mother (Margaret Montour Hunter) the daughter of an Oneida Chief. She married Seneca Indian Chief Thomas Htitson. Catherine Montour's Seneca Tribe was a member of the Iroquois Confederacy. During America's War of Independence reprisals were sanctioned against tribes of the Haudenosaunee Confederacy who had allied themselves with Great Britain. The infamous nearby Battle of Newtown (August 1779) and the march that devastated Queanettquaga (and forty other American Indian villages of the Finger Lakes) is known as the Sullivan–Clinton Expedition. In addition to burning Montour's log palace, orchards were cut down, homes destroyed, livestock killed and cropland salted. Residents of Catharine's Town dispersed to areas as far away as Niagara and Canada. Montour (b. 1710, died February 20, 1804) is memorialized by a grave mound located on her namesake Catharine Trail within the Montour Falls village limits.

By 1788 the area began to be settled by European Americans. In 1805 the area was known as Mill's Landing after local resident George Mills. (The nearby village of Millport, to current times, is also named for George Mills). The year 1802 is the earliest date commonly used to mark the beginning of the Montour Falls community, the year George Mills was appointed postmaster. It is estimated the community of 1802 consisted of twenty residents and no stores.

Beginning in 1827 and completed in 1833, the Chemung Canal was built through Mills Landing to connect the Chemung River and its watershed to Seneca Lake. Mills Landing, later Havana, would become commercially significant given its location at the head of navigation on the Seneca Lake inlet. At the north end of the lake, another canal connected to the Erie Canal, leading both to the Great Lakes and to the Hudson River and port of New York City, to increase trade and commerce in the region. The village remained unincorporated until May 13, 1836, when it officially adopted a new name to become Havana, New York. The village of Havana was designated the first county seat of newly formed Schuyler County in 1854. By 1861 the county seat would be moved to Watkins Glen.

The current name was adopted for the village on March 20, 1895. The Town of Montour is also named after Catherine Montour.

From 1850 to 1888 the area's Havana pottery stoneware manufacturing community comprised six firms: Savage, Parsons & Co., Savage & Rogers, Brewer & Halm, S. T. Brewer, H. M. Whitman, J. M. Whitman and A. O. Whittemore.

Charles Cook, businessmen, politician (Canal Commissioner and State Senator), philanthropist and visionary, is credited with the establishment of Schuyler County (1854) and Havana, New York, as its first county seat; the Cook Academy (originally the People's College) began construction in 1858. Today the same facility is home to the New York State Academy of Fire Science. Cook also served as president of the Chemung Canal Trust Bank, the oldest continuously operating bank in the region dating to 1835. On November 20, 1886, a tribute service held at Cook Academy was attended by Governor David Hill and more than 1,000 citizens, associates and admirers of Cook. A bust of Charles Cook was dedicated at the tribute service. Charles Cook never married.

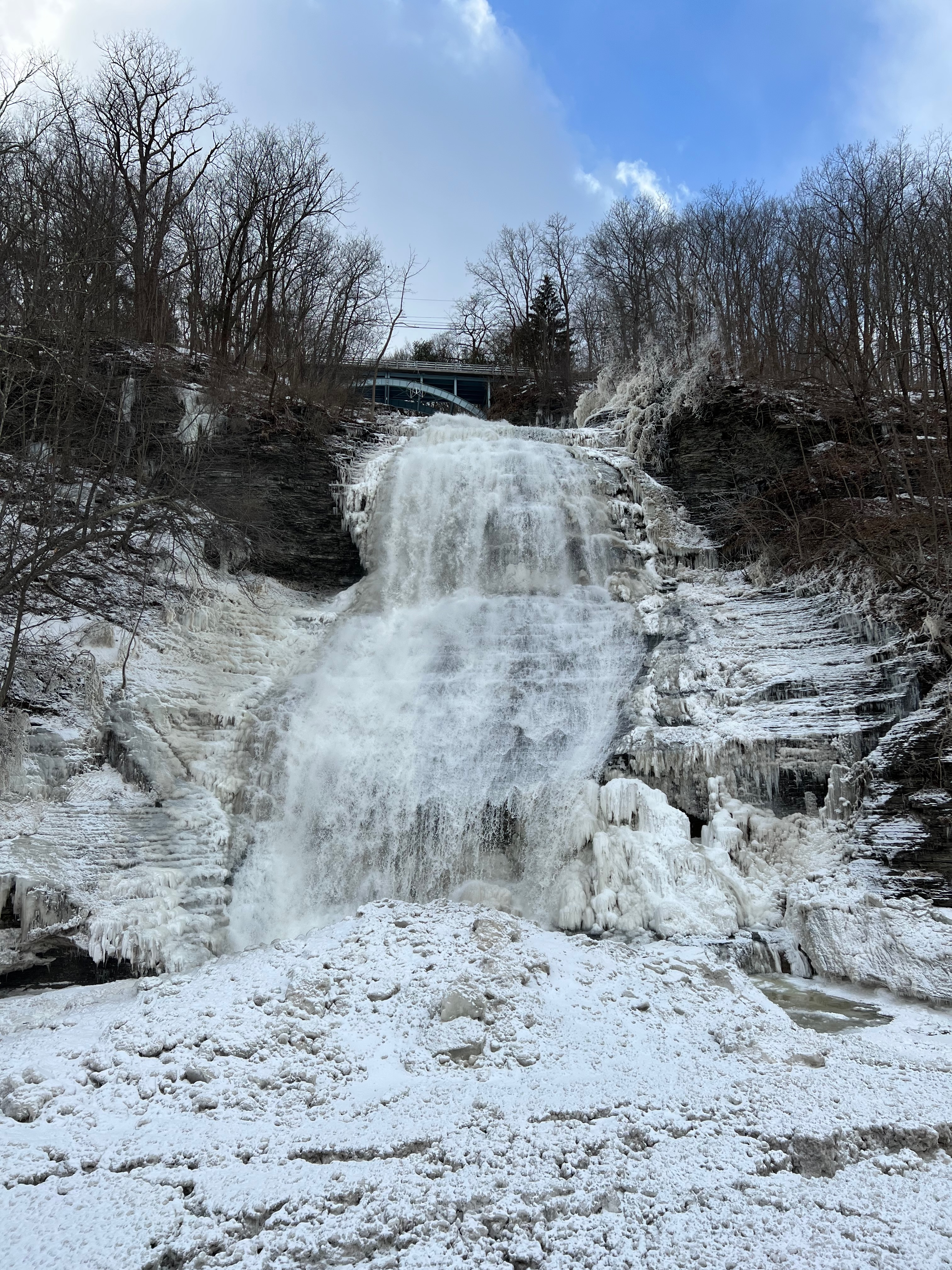
Shequaga Falls in the winter

In 1872, two local engineers from Havana formed a materials handling company they called Shepard Niles. In 1902, they built their first heavy duty crane and sold it around the world. The company is still in business today. From their website: "Workhorse cranes and hoists that last virtually forever—this is what industry expects from Shepard Niles. Our custom hand-built, heavy-duty Class D and E cranes and hoists helped America become the world's leading industrial nation, and powered our country through two World Wars." While the company is ongoing, since its acquisition in 1989, its primary operations are no longer domiciled in Montour Falls.

In 1934, the National Bank of Montour Falls is listed in the Federal Reserve Bank roster Second District. The National Bank of Montour Falls (also 1934) is the issuing bank on a US $10.00 (ten-dollar) Federal Reserve note.

Montour Falls is well-known for the natural attraction of a 165-foot (50 m) waterfall located on the west side of the village. At the base of the falls is a sign labeled "She-qua-ga", a transliteration of its Seneca name. A bridge above the waterfall spells the name as "Che-qua-ga". Many historic names have been recorded under a wide variety of spellings, especially as various peoples tried to transliterate them from one language to another. This attraction is also known as "Montour Falls".

The Brick Tavern Stand, Montour Falls Historic District, and Montour Falls Union Grammar School are listed on the National Register of Historic Places.

== Geography ==
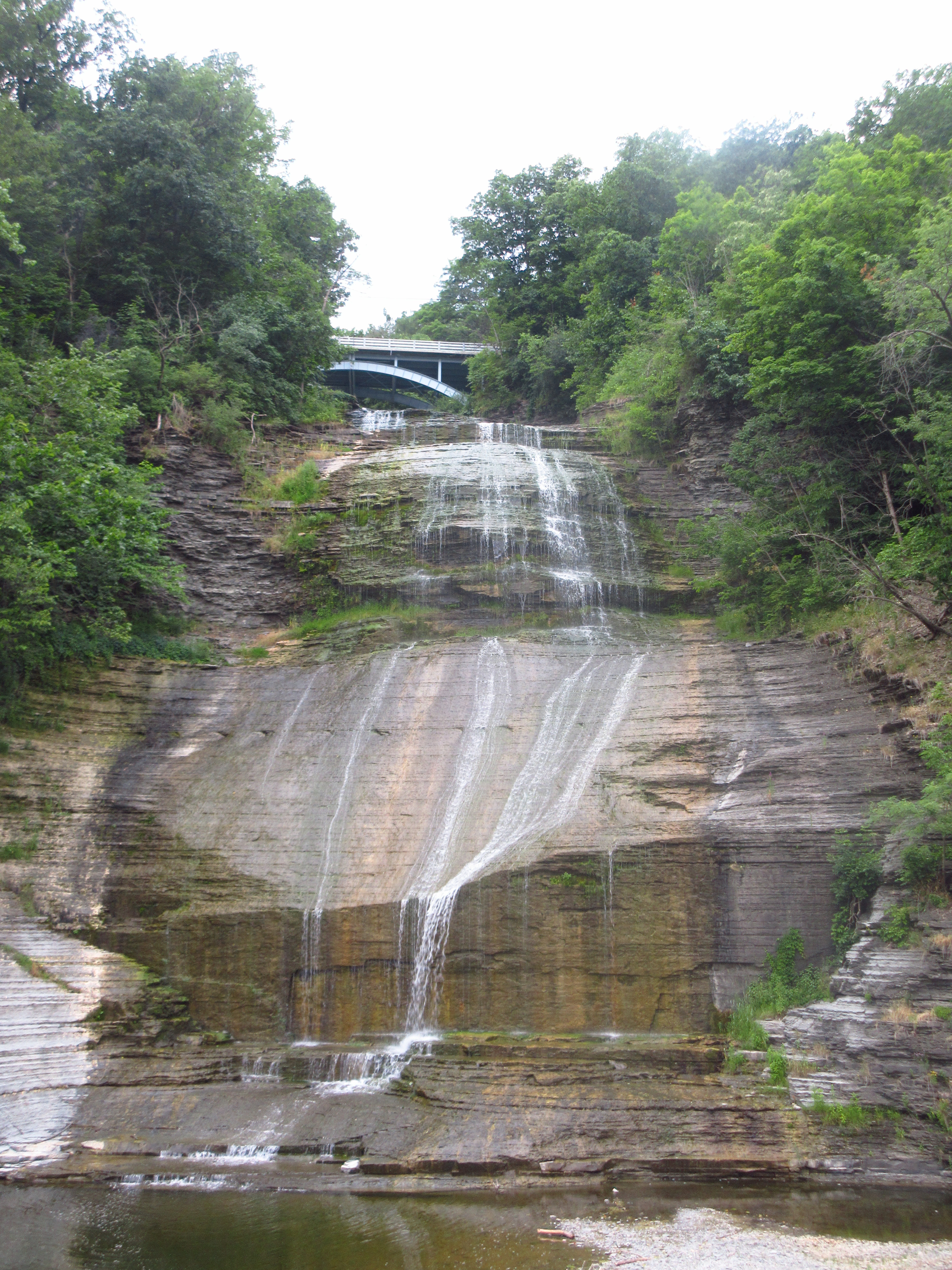
Shequaga Falls, which is located in a park in a residential portion of the community, during the dry season.

Montour Falls is located at 42°20′57″N 76°50′47″W (42.349209, -76.846450).

According to the United States Census Bureau, the village has a total area of 3.0 square miles (7.8 km^{2}), of which 3.0 square miles (7.8 km^{2}) is land and 0.04 square miles (0.10 km^{2}) (0.66%) is water. Catharine Creek flows northward through the Catharine Creek Valley toward Seneca Lake.

New York State Route 14 intersects New York State Route 224 in Montour Falls.

== Demographics ==
Historical population
Census	Pop.	Note	%±
1870	1,273		—
1880	1,274		0.1%
1890	1,751		37.4%
1900	1,193		−31.9%
1910	1,208		1.3%
1920	1,560		29.1%
1930	1,489		−4.6%
1940	1,345		−9.7%
1950	1,457		8.3%
1960	1,533		5.2%
1970	1,534		0.1%
1980	1,791		16.8%
1990	1,845		3.0%
2000	1,797		−2.6%
2010	1,711		−4.8%
2020	1,635		−4.4%
U.S. Decennial Census

As of the census of 2000, there were 1,797 people, 701 households, and 419 families residing in the village. The population density was 597.7 inhabitants per square mile (230.8/km^{2}). There were 755 housing units at an average density of 251.1 per square mile (97.0/km^{2}). The racial makeup of the village was 97.61% White, 1.00% African American, 0.33% Native American, 0.22% Asian, 0.17% Pacific Islander, and 0.67% from two or more races. Hispanic or Latino of any race were 0.39% of the population.

There were 701 households, out of which 26.1% had children under the age of 18 living with them, 42.2% were married couples living together, 12.7% had a female householder with no husband present, and 40.1% were non-families. 33.0% of all households were made up of individuals, and 20.7% had someone living alone who was 65 years of age or older. The average household size was 2.22 and the average family size was 2.79.

In the village, the population was spread out, with 19.1% under the age of 18, 7.6% from 18 to 24, 23.9% from 25 to 44, 21.6% from 45 to 64, and 27.7% who were 65 years of age or older. The median age was 44 years. For every 100 females, there were 77.9 males. For every 100 females age 18 and over, there were 70.1 males.

The median income for a household in the village was $29,018, and the median income for a family was $36,307. Males had a median income of $31,064 versus $21,813 for females. The per capita income for the village was $15,671. About 11.5% of families and 15.3% of the population were below the poverty line, including 24.0% of those under age 18 and 7.4% of those age 65 or over.

== Notable people ==
- William Terry Jackson, former US Congressman (1849-1851); died in Havana, New York on September 15, 1882, age 87.
- David Bennett Hill, born in Havana, New York on August 29, 1843. 29th Governor of New York (1885-1891); capital punishment by electrocution signed into New Law by Governor David Hill on June 4, 1888.
- Charles Cook, State Senator (District 27, 1862-3), advocated for formation of Schuyler County (1854), Founded Cook Academy in 1858 Havana, New York; currently, the Cook Academy building houses the Academy of Fire Science for New York.
- Jane Arminda Delano, born in Havana, New York on March 12, 1862, founder of the American Red Cross Nursing Service, died in Savenay Loire-Atlantique, France (April 15, 1919). Was interred at Arlington National Cemetery.

== See also ==
- History of Cornell University - including excerpts on the history of People's College in Havana (now Montour Falls), New York's first land-grant college under the Morrill Acts.
- David B. Hill born (1843) in Havana, New York, 29th Governor of New York
