= Tyrone, New York =

- Town
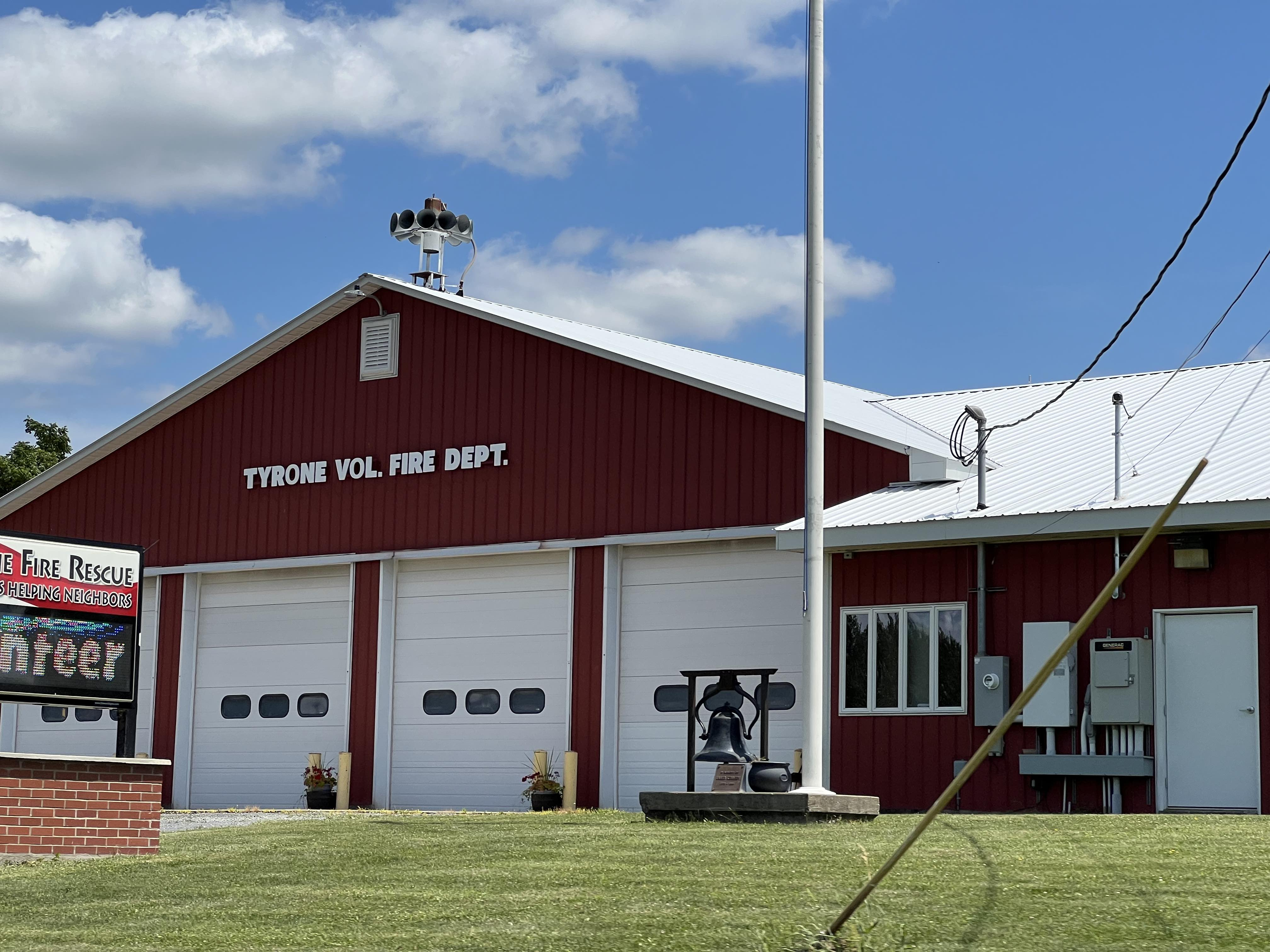
- Volunteer fire department in Tyrone, New York.
- Nickname: http://www.townoftyrone.org/
- Location within the state of New York
- Coordinates: 42°25′N 77°4′W
- Country: United States
- State: New York
- County: Schuyler

Area
  - Total: 39.63 sq mi (102.64 km^{2})
  - Land: 37.30 sq mi (96.60 km^{2})
  - Water: 2.33 sq mi (6.04 km^{2})
- Elevation: 1,690 ft (515 m)

Population (2020)
  - Total: 1,650 ▲
  - Estimate (2021): 1,635
  - Density: 42.5/sq mi (16.41/km^{2})
- Time zone: UTC-5 (Eastern (EST))
  - Summer (DST): UTC-4 (EDT)
- ZIP code: 14887
- Area code: 607
- FIPS code: 36-75924
- GNIS feature ID: 0979568
- Website: http://www.townoftyrone.org/

Tyrone is a town in Schuyler County, New York, United States. The population was 1,650 at the 2020 census.

The town of Tyrone is in the northwest part of the county and is east of Bath.

== History ==
The "Lamoka Culture" people lived in the area up to about 1300 BCE. The Lamoka site is a National Historic Landmark.

The town was first settled around 1800. The town was formed from the Town of Wayne while still part of Steuben County in 1822. The town of Tyrone was named for County Tyrone, Ireland by Gen. William Kernan, one of the original settlers and the father of United States Senator Francis Kernan. Tyrone became part of the newly created Schuyler County in 1845.

== Geography ==
According to the United States Census Bureau, the town has a total area of 39.6 square miles (103 km^{2}), of which, 37.5 square miles (97 km^{2}) is land and 2.1 square miles (5.4 km^{2}) (5.36%) is water.

The northern town line (and part of the eastern town boundary) is the border of Yates County, the eastern border running along the old Preemption Line, and the western town line is border of Steuben County.

New York State Route 226 runs northeast to southwest through the town. New York State Route 230 crosses the northwest corner of Tyrone.

Lamoka Lake is mostly within the town at its western town line.

== Demographics ==
Historical population
Census	Pop.	Note	%±
1830	1,880		—
1840	2,122		12.9%
1850	1,894		−10.7%
1860	2,096		10.7%
1870	1,993		−4.9%
1880	2,059		3.3%
1890	1,680		−18.4%
1900	1,586		−5.6%
1910	1,285		−19.0%
1920	1,100		−14.4%
1930	1,050		−4.5%
1940	1,024		−2.5%
1950	1,076		5.1%
1960	1,137		5.7%
1970	1,254		10.3%
1980	1,479		17.9%
1990	1,620		9.5%
2000	1,714		5.8%
2010	1,597		−6.8%
2020	1,650		3.3%
2021 (est.)	1,635		−0.9%
U.S. Decennial Census

As of the census of 2000, there were 1,714 people, 664 households, and 492 families residing in the town. The population density was 45.7 inhabitants per square mile (17.6/km^{2}). There were 1,296 housing units at an average density of 34.6 per square mile (13.4/km^{2}). The racial makeup of the town was 96.32% White, 1.23% African American, 0.35% Native American, 0.06% Asian, 0.41% from other races, and 1.63% from two or more races. Hispanic or Latino of any race were 0.82% of the population.

There were 664 households, out of which 31.0% had children under the age of 18 living with them, 60.8% were married couples living together, 8.6% had a female householder with no husband present, and 25.9% were non-families. 20.5% of all households were made up of individuals, and 10.2% had someone living alone who was 65 years of age or older. The average household size was 2.58 and the average family size was 2.94.

In the town, the population was spread out, with 27.0% under the age of 18, 5.5% from 18 to 24, 24.4% from 25 to 44, 25.8% from 45 to 64, and 17.4% who were 65 years of age or older. The median age was 41 years. For every 100 females, there were 106.0 males. For every 100 females age 18 and over, there were 100.5 males.

The median income for a household in the town was $31,597, and the median income for a family was $34,444. Males had a median income of $30,250 versus $22,404 for females. The per capita income for the town was $14,842. About 10.5% of families and 13.5% of the population were below the poverty line, including 17.7% of those under age 18 and 6.5% of those age 65 or over.

== Communities and locations in the Town of Tyrone ==
- Altay (formerly "Kendall Hollow") – A hamlet northeast of Tyrone village on NY-226.
- Camp Gorton – A location on the eastern side of Waneta Lake on County Road 25.
- Gingerbread Corners – A location in the eastern part of the town.
- Halls Corners – A location on the eastern town line.
- Lamoka Lake (previously "Mud Lake") – A lake in the western part of the town. It is approximately 1.5 miles (2.4 km) long. An archaeological excavation here found remains of prehistoric natives, sometimes called the "Lamoka Culture."
- Pine Grove – A former community in the town.
- Shorewood – A hamlet on the western side of Waneta Lake by the west town line.
- Six Corners – A location on the northern town line.
- Tobehanna Creek – A stream flowing past Tyrone village into Lamoka Lake.
- Tyrone – The hamlet of Tyrone is east of Lamoka Lake on County Road 23.
- Waneta Lake (previously "Little Lake") – A lake in the northwestern part of the town, about 2.8 miles (4.5 km) long, north of and connected to Lamoka Lake. A small, western part of the lake is in Steuben County.
- Waneta-Lamoka Wildlife Management Area – A conservation area between the two lakes.
- Wayne Village – A hamlet in the northwest corner of the town on NY-230, partly in the town of Wayne in Steuben County. The Second Baptist Church of Wayne was listed on the National Register of Historic Places in 2014.
- Weston – A hamlet northwest of Tyrone village on County Road 23 and north of Lamoka Lake. The Weston Schoolhouse was listed on the National Register of Historic Places in 1998.
