= Orange, New York =

Town in Schuyler County, New York, US

- Town
- Location within the state of New York
- Coordinates: 42°19′59″N 77°2′7″W
- Country: United States
- State: New York
- County: Schuyler

Area
  - Total: 54.45 sq mi (141.03 km^{2})
  - Land: 54.07 sq mi (140.04 km^{2})
  - Water: 0.39 sq mi (1.00 km^{2})
- Elevation: 1,713 ft (522 m)

Population (2020)
  - Total: 1,408
  - Estimate (2022): 1,401
  - Density: 26.0/sq mi (10.05/km^{2})
- Time zone: UTC-5 (Eastern (EST))
  - Summer (DST): UTC-4 (EDT)
- FIPS code: 36-55156
- GNIS feature ID: 0979315
- Website: http://www.townoforangeny.us/

Orange is a town in Schuyler County, New York, United States. The population was 1,408 at the 2020 census.

The Town of Orange is in the southwestern part of the county and is east of Bath.

== History ==
The first settlements took place circa 1798.

The town was formed from Town of Wayne in 1813 as the "Town of Jersey" while still part of Steuben County. The current name was adopted in 1836. Orange was increased by parts of Hornby (1842) and Bradford (1854).

The town was made part of the new Schuyler County in 1854.

== Geography ==
According to the United States Census Bureau, the town has a total area of 54.5 square miles (141 km^{2}), of which 54.1 square miles (140 km^{2}) is land and 0.4 square miles (1.0 km^{2}) (0.71%) is water.

The south and west town lines are the border of Steuben County.

New York State Route 226 crosses the northwestern corner of Orange.

== Demographics ==
Historical population
Census	Pop.	Note	%±
1820	912		—
1830	2,391		162.2%
1840	1,824		−23.7%
1850	2,055		12.7%
1860	2,364		15.0%
1870	1,960		−17.1%
1880	3,020		54.1%
1890	1,557		−48.4%
1900	1,891		21.5%
1910	1,087		−42.5%
1920	889		−18.2%
1930	812		−8.7%
1940	693		−14.7%
1950	890		28.4%
1960	1,047		17.6%
1970	1,076		2.8%
1980	1,358		26.2%
1990	1,561		14.9%
2000	1,752		12.2%
2010	1,609		−8.2%
2020	1,408		−12.5%
2022 (est.)	1,401		−0.5%
U.S. Decennial Census

As of the census of 2000, there were 1,752 people, 523 households, and 408 families residing in the town. The population density was 32.4 inhabitants per square mile (12.5/km^{2}). There were 666 housing units at an average density of 12.3 per square mile (4.7/km^{2}). The racial makeup of the town was 87.90% White, 9.02% African American, 0.11% Native American, 0.34% Asian, 1.54% from other races, and 1.08% from two or more races. Hispanic or Latino of any race were 5.08% of the population.

There were 523 households, out of which 39.4% had children under the age of 18 living with them, 64.1% were married couples living together, 8.8% had a female householder with no husband present, and 21.8% were non-families. 17.8% of all households were made up of individuals, and 7.6% had someone living alone who was 65 years of age or older. The average household size was 2.76 and the average family size was 3.11.

In the town, the population was spread out, with 25.9% under the age of 18, 19.7% from 18 to 24, 24.8% from 25 to 44, 20.9% from 45 to 64, and 8.7% who were 65 years of age or older. The median age was 30 years. For every 100 females, there were 142.3 males. For every 100 females age 18 and over, there were 148.7 males.

The median income for a household in the town was $37,167, and the median income for a family was $42,500. Males had a median income of $31,940 versus $23,854 for females. The per capita income for the town was $12,409. About 13.3% of families and 16.0% of the population were below the poverty line, including 23.2% of those under age 18 and 8.0% of those age 65 or over.

== Politics ==
Orange town vote by party in presidential elections
Year	Democratic	Republican	Third Parties
2016	19.26% 125	74.88% 486	5.86% 38
2012	36.93% 209	60.60% 343	2.47% 14

== Communities and locations in the Town of Orange ==
- Lamoka Lake – A lake partly in the northwestern part of the town.
- Meads Creek – This stream, flowing southwesterly through the town, is a tributary of the Cohocton River.
- Monterey – A hamlet in the south-central part of the town.
- Pine Creek – A hamlet in the northern part of the town on County Road 22.
