= Lamoka site =

- Lamoka
- U.S. National Register of Historic Places
- U.S. National Historic Landmark
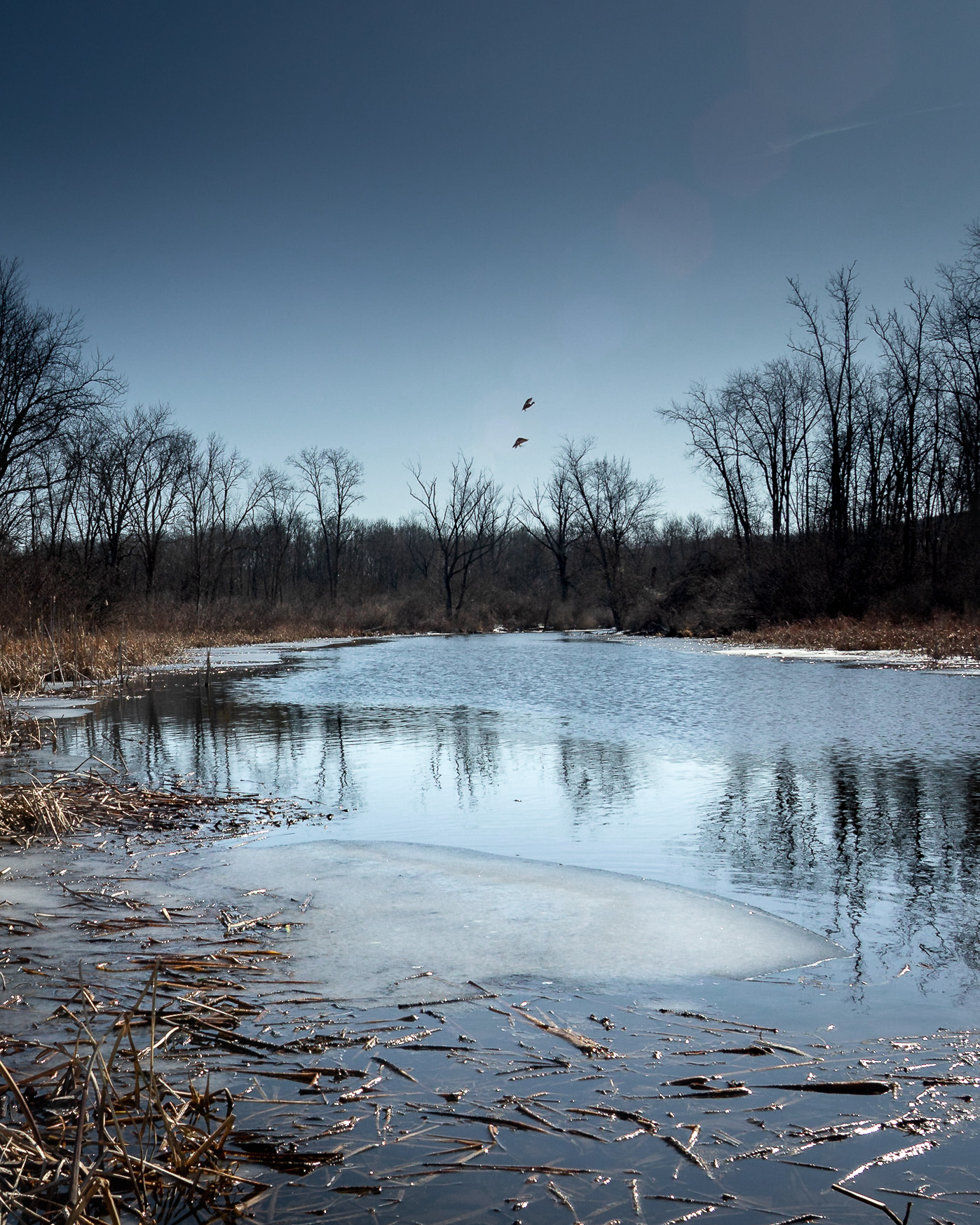
- A portion of the Lamoka site which overlooks the channel that connects Lamoka Lake and Waneta Lake.
- Location: Address restricted
- Nearest city: Tyrone, New York
- NRHP reference No.: 66000571

Significant dates
- Added to NRHP: October 15, 1966
- Designated NHL: January 20, 1961

The Lamoka site, or simply Lamoka, is an archaeological site near Tyrone, in Schuyler County, New York that was named a National Historic Landmark in 1961. According to the National Park Service, "This site provided the first clear evidence of an Archaic hunting and gathering culture in the Northeastern United States (c.3500 BC)".

More properly known as the Lamoka Lake Site, after the lake of the same name located nearby, this archaeological site, occupied by Late Archaic hunter-gatherers approximately 4,500 years before present, is one of the most important Archaic Period sites in North America due to its seminal role in the identification and naming of a hunting and gathering culture subsequent to Paleo-Indian culture and preceding pottery-using Woodland cultures. As such, the Lamoka Lake site is often considered the type site of the Archaic Period of North American prehistory.

The first professional excavations at the site were conducted between 1925 and 1928 by the Rochester Museum of Arts and Sciences, now the Rochester Museum and Science Center. Additional excavations at the Lamoka Lake site were conducted by the New York State Museum in 1958 and 1962, by the Buffalo Museum of Science in the 1980s, by Utica College in the 1990s, and by Rutgers University in 2000. Part of the archaeological site is protected in the Waneta-Lamoka Wildlife Management Area. In 2006, the remaining portion of the site was purchased for preservation by The Archaeological Conservancy.

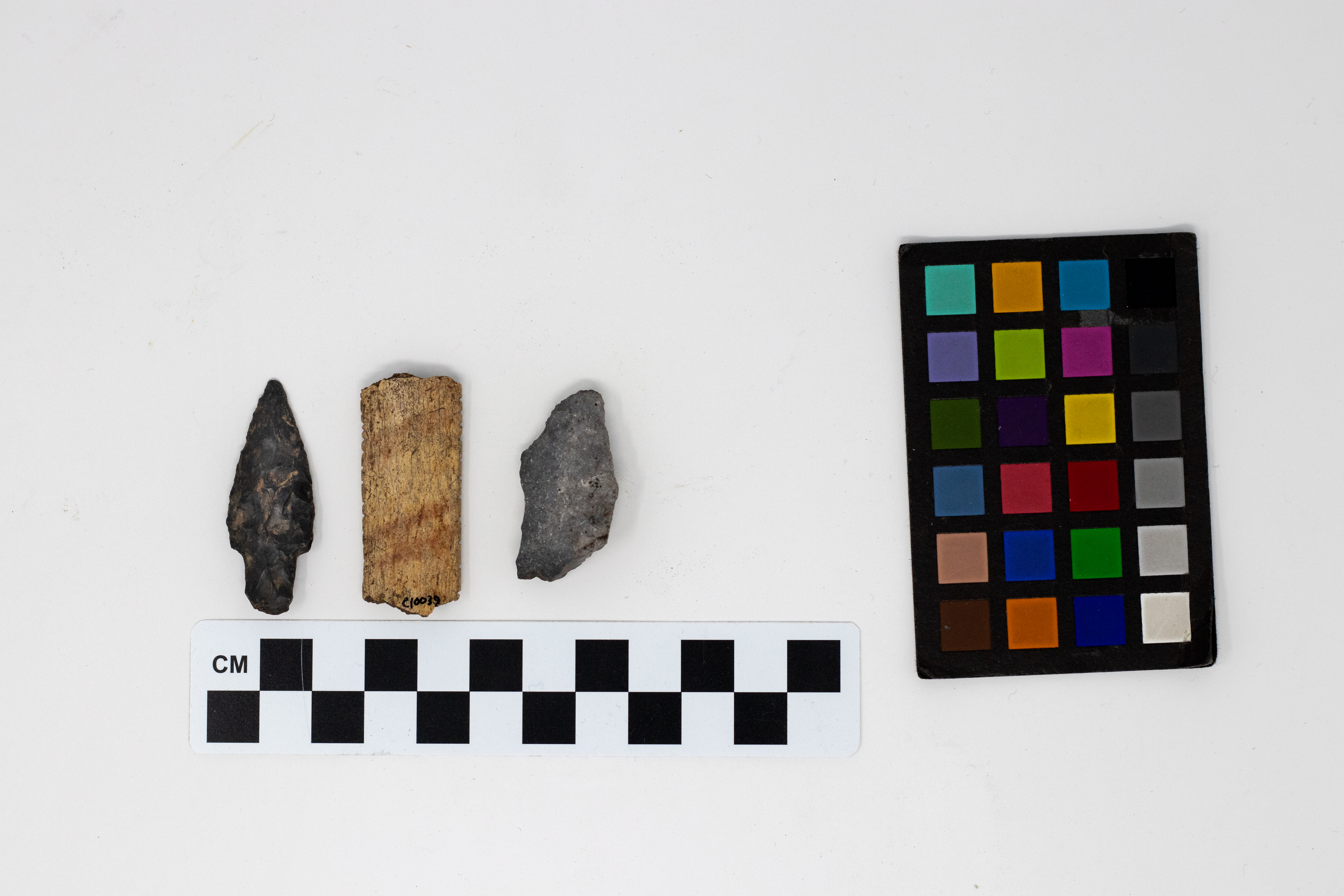
These artifacts were recovered from the Lamoka site, during digs conducted by the Buffalo Museum of Science. In this photograph are projectile points and a deer bone talisman.

Archaeological excavations at the Lamoka Lake site have recovered large numbers of projectile points – primarily Lamoka points; stone netsinkers, groundstone and polished stone tools – including beveled adzes, hammerstones, pestles, mullers, mortars, and metates; bone tools – including awls, knives, and fish hooks; lithic debitage; and animal bones – primarily white-tailed deer, tree squirrel, and passenger pigeon; and human burials. Numerous archaeological features, including pits, postmolds, hearths, firebeds and ash layers, have also been identified. The majority of artifacts and features date to the Late Archaic Period, although later Woodland Period artifacts have also been recovered from the site.
