= List of New York State Historic Markers in Steuben County, New York =

This is a complete list of New York State Historic Markers in Steuben County, New York.

== Listings county-wide ==
	Marker name	Image	Date designated	Location	City or Town	Marker text
1	Pulteney Square			On Morris St., Bath	Bath, New York	here in 1793 was made the first clearing in Steuben County by Col. Charles Williamson.
2	Site of Bath Soldiers' and Sailors' Home			On US 15 north of Bath.	Bath, New York	U.S. Veterans Administration Facility, site of Bath Soldiers' and Sailors' Home, built in 1877.
3	Averell Hill			Civon Co. Rd. at W. Ameronil	Cameron, New York	Birthplace of William Woods Averell, Major General, U.S.A. Noted cavalry leader of the War.
4	French Occupation			On NYS 36 near Junction with NYS 248.	Canisteo, New York	Here in 1690 Sieur de Villiers and Abbe Fenelon discovered a settlement, erected a cross, and...
5	Kanestio Castle			On NYS 36 near Junction with NYS 248.	Canisteo, New York	Indian village burned 1764 by Capt. Andrew Montour and a provincial force.
6	Kanestio Castle			On NYS 36 near Junction with NYS 248.	Canisteo, New York	Indian village burned 1764 by Capt. Andrew Montour and a provincial force.
7	Wyoming Massacre			On Co. Rd. about 1/2 mile north of Hornell.	Hornellsville, New York	Here Indians & Tories used pine trees to build canoes for transport to Wyoming - Wyoming Massacre, July 3, 1778.
8	Oldest House			On NYS 21 at Canisteo-Hornellsville Town Line.	Hornellsville, New York	Oldest House in Steuben County erected 1797 by Col. James McBurney a probable station of...
9	Old Inn Site			On NYS 70 at Howard.	Howard, New York	Dr. Marcus Whitman, Rev. and Mrs. H.H. Spalding met here Feb. 14, 1836 and decided to go...
10	Marcus Whitman			On NYS 53 at Wheeler	Wheeler, New York	150 feet (Arrow) formerly the office of Marcus Whitman, Missionary & physician. lived at Wheeler 1828–35.
11	Henry Harmon Spalding			On NYS 53 2 miles south of Wheeler.	Wheeler, New York	Missionary to Indians of North-West Territory and pioneer to State of Idaho born here, Nov. 26, 1803.

== See also ==
- List of New York State Historic Markers
- National Register of Historic Places listings in New York
- List of National Historic Landmarks in New York
