= Cohocton =

Cohocton may refer to:

- Cohocton (town), New York
- Cohocton (village), New York
- Cohocton River, a tributary of the Chemung River
