= Avoca, New York (disambiguation) =

Avoca, New York is the name of a town and a village in Steuben County, New York:

- Avoca (village), New York
- Avoca (town), New York
