= Fremont, New York =

Fremont is the name of more than one location in the U.S. state of New York:

- Fremont, Steuben County, New York
- Fremont, Sullivan County, New York
