= Dansville, Steuben County, New York =

Dansville
- Town
- Location of Dansville in New York
- Coordinates: 42°28′37″N 77°39′56″W
- Country: United States
- State: New York
- County: Steuben

Area
  - Total: 48 sq mi (125 km^{2})
  - Land: 48 sq mi (124 km^{2})
  - Water: 0.10 sq mi (0.26 km^{2})

Population (2010)
  - Total: 1,842
  - Estimate (2014): 1,825
  - Density: 38.5/sq mi (14.9/km^{2})
- Website: Town website

Dansville is a town in Steuben County, New York, United States, not to be confused with the nearby village of Dansville in Livingston County. The population was 1,842 at the 2010 census. The town was named after Daniel Faulkner.

The Town of Dansville is in the northwest corner of the county, north of Hornell.

== History ==
The town was formed, along with the county, in 1796 as one of the original towns in the county, but was not settled until circa 1804. Daniel P. Faulkner, a prominent citizen, was popularly called "Captain Dan".

The Town of Dansville was used to form, in whole or part, the Towns of Cohocton, Howard (both in 1812), Wayland (1848), and Fremont (1854). In 1822, part of the town, including the Village of Dansville, was annexed to the Town of Sparta in Livingston County.

== Geography ==
According to the United States Census Bureau, the town has a total area of 48.1 square miles (125 km^{2}), of which 48.0 square miles (124 km^{2}) is land and 0.1 square miles (0.26 km^{2}) (0.15%) is water.

The Village of Dansville is located north of this town, but is in Livingston County. Livingston County also forms the north and part of the western border of Dansville. Allegany County forms the remainder of the western town line.

New York State Route 36 is an important north-south highway in Dansville. Interstate 390 passes through the northeast corner of the town.

== Demographics ==
Historical population
Census	Pop.	Note	%±
1820	1,565		—
1830	1,728		10.4%
1840	2,725		57.7%
1850	2,545		−6.6%
1860	2,187		−14.1%
1870	1,981		−9.4%
1880	1,788		−9.7%
1890	1,559		−12.8%
1900	1,417		−9.1%
1910	1,303		−8.0%
1920	1,031		−20.9%
1930	995		−3.5%
1940	794		−20.2%
1950	1,113		40.2%
1960	1,125		1.1%
1970	1,453		29.2%
1980	1,455		0.1%
1990	1,811		24.5%
2000	1,978		9.2%
2010	1,842		−6.9%
2014 (est.)	1,825		−0.9%
U.S. Decennial Census

As of the census of 2000, there were 1,977 people, 735 households, and 554 families residing in the town. The population density was 41.2 inhabitants per square mile (15.9/km^{2}). There were 833 housing units at an average density of 17.4 per square mile (6.7/km^{2}). The racial makeup of the town was 96.71% White, 0.76% African American, 0.86% Native American, 0.15% Asian, 0.05% Pacific Islander, 0.30% from other races, and 1.16% from two or more races. Hispanic or Latino of any race were 1.47% of the population.

There were 735 households, out of which 38.0% had children under the age of 18 living with them, 60.1% were married couples living together, 9.7% had a female householder with no husband present, and 24.6% were non-families. 18.5% of all households were made up of individuals, and 6.7% had someone living alone who was 65 years of age or older. The average household size was 2.69 and the average family size was 3.06.

In the town, the population was spread out, with 29.0% under the age of 18, 6.6% from 18 to 24, 28.8% from 25 to 44, 24.3% from 45 to 64, and 11.3% who were 65 years of age or older. The median age was 37 years. For every 100 females, there were 102.1 males. For every 100 females age 18 and over, there were 98.9 males.

The median income for a household in the town was $35,875, and the median income for a family was $40,909. Males had a median income of $30,274 versus $24,118 for females. The per capita income for the town was $15,094. About 7.6% of families and 10.0% of the population were below the poverty line, including 11.1% of those under age 18 and 6.8% of those age 65 or over.

== Communities and locations in the Town of Dansville ==
- Beachville – A hamlet in the eastern part of the town, southeast of South Dansville at County Roads 46 and 50.
- Dotys Corners – A location by the west town line on NY Route 36.
- Rogersville – A location of a railroad station on the Shawmut Line.
- South Dansville – A hamlet on County Road 46 and Mill Creek. It is the primary community in the town.
- Stony Brook – A stream that flows northward from the town.
- Stony Brook Glen – A scenic location in the northern part of the town.
- Stony Brook State Park – A state park in the northeast part of the town, located on NY-36.

== Notable native ==
- Andrew J. Lorish (November 8, 1832–August 11, 1897), a Commissary Sergeant in the Union Army and a Medal of Honor recipient for his actions in the American Civil War.
