= Cohocton, New York =

Cohocton
- Town
- Location of Cohocton in New York
- Coordinates: 42°30′02″N 77°30′01″W
- Country: United States
- State: New York
- County: Steuben
- Established: 1812

Area
  - Total: 56.09 sq mi (145.27 km^{2})
  - Land: 56.08 sq mi (145.25 km^{2})
  - Water: 0.0077 sq mi (0.02 km^{2})

Population (2020)
  - Total: 2,268 ▼
  - Estimate (2021): 2,239
  - Density: 44.5/sq mi (17.18/km^{2})
- Time zone: UTC-5 (Eastern (EST))
  - Summer (DST): UTC-4 (EDT)
- FIPS code: 36-101-16738
- Website: https://townofcohoctonny.gov/

Cohocton is a town in Steuben County, New York, United States. The population was 2,268 at the 2020 census. The town contains a village, also called Cohocton and is located in the northwestern part of the county.

== History ==
The town was first settled around 1794. The town was formed from the towns of Bath and Dansville in 1812. It was originally known as the town of Liberty. Part of the town was later used to form new towns in the county: Avoca (1843) and Wayland (1848). In 1874, the town was enlarged by the addition of a part of the town of Prattsburgh. The Larrowe House, also known as The Cohocton Town and Village Hall and located at the village of Cohocton, was listed on the National Register of Historic Places in 1989. At least as late as 1836 the spellings Cohocton and Conhocton were used, even in the same text, but by 1860 the shorter spelling was consistent.

== Geography ==
According to the United States Census Bureau, the town has a total area of 56.1 square miles (145.2 km^{2}), all land.

The northern town line is the border of Livingston and Ontario counties.

Interstate 390, New York State Route 21, New York State Route 371 and New York State Route 415 pass through the town. The Interstate and NY-415 partly follow the course of the Cohocton River.

== Demographics ==
Historical population
Census	Pop.	Note	%±
1820	1,560		—
1830	2,711		73.8%
1840	2,965		9.4%
1850	1,993		−32.8%
1860	2,535		27.2%
1870	2,710		6.9%
1880	3,346		23.5%
1890	3,444		2.9%
1900	3,197		−7.2%
1910	2,926		−8.5%
1920	2,585		−11.7%
1930	2,516		−2.7%
1940	2,474		−1.7%
1950	2,418		−2.3%
1960	2,451		1.4%
1970	2,379		−2.9%
1980	2,466		3.7%
1990	2,520		2.2%
2000	2,626		4.2%
2010	2,561		−2.5%
2020	2,268		−11.4%
2021 (est.)	2,239	▼	−1.3%
U.S. Decennial Census

As of the census of 2000, there were 2,626 people, 972 households, and 704 families residing in the town. The population density was 46.8 inhabitants per square mile (18.1/km^{2}). There were 1,144 housing units at an average density of 20.4 per square mile (7.9/km^{2}). The racial makeup of the town was 97.49% White, 0.46% Black or African American, 0.61% Native American, 0.27% Asian, 0.19% from other races, and 0.99% from two or more races. Hispanic or Latino of any race were 0.27% of the population.

There were 972 households, out of which 38.7% had children under the age of 18 living with them, 57.5% were married couples living together, 9.1% had a female householder with no husband present, and 27.5% were non-families. 21.3% of all households were made up of individuals, and 9.5% had someone living alone who was 65 years of age or older. The average household size was 2.69 and the average family size was 3.10.

In the town, the population was spread out, with 28.8% under the age of 18, 7.0% from 18 to 24, 29.4% from 25 to 44, 22.4% from 45 to 64, and 12.4% who were 65 years of age or older. The median age was 36 years. For every 100 females, there were 98.9 males. For every 100 females age 18 and over, there were 98.5 males.

The median income for a household in the town was $35,559, and the median income for a family was $39,583. Males had a median income of $28,333 versus $25,208 for females. The per capita income for the town was $15,243. About 12.9% of families and 17.6% of the population were below the poverty line, including 25.1% of those under age 18 and 9.3% of those age 65 or over.

The 1890 population was 3,475.

== Communities and locations in the Town of Cohocton ==
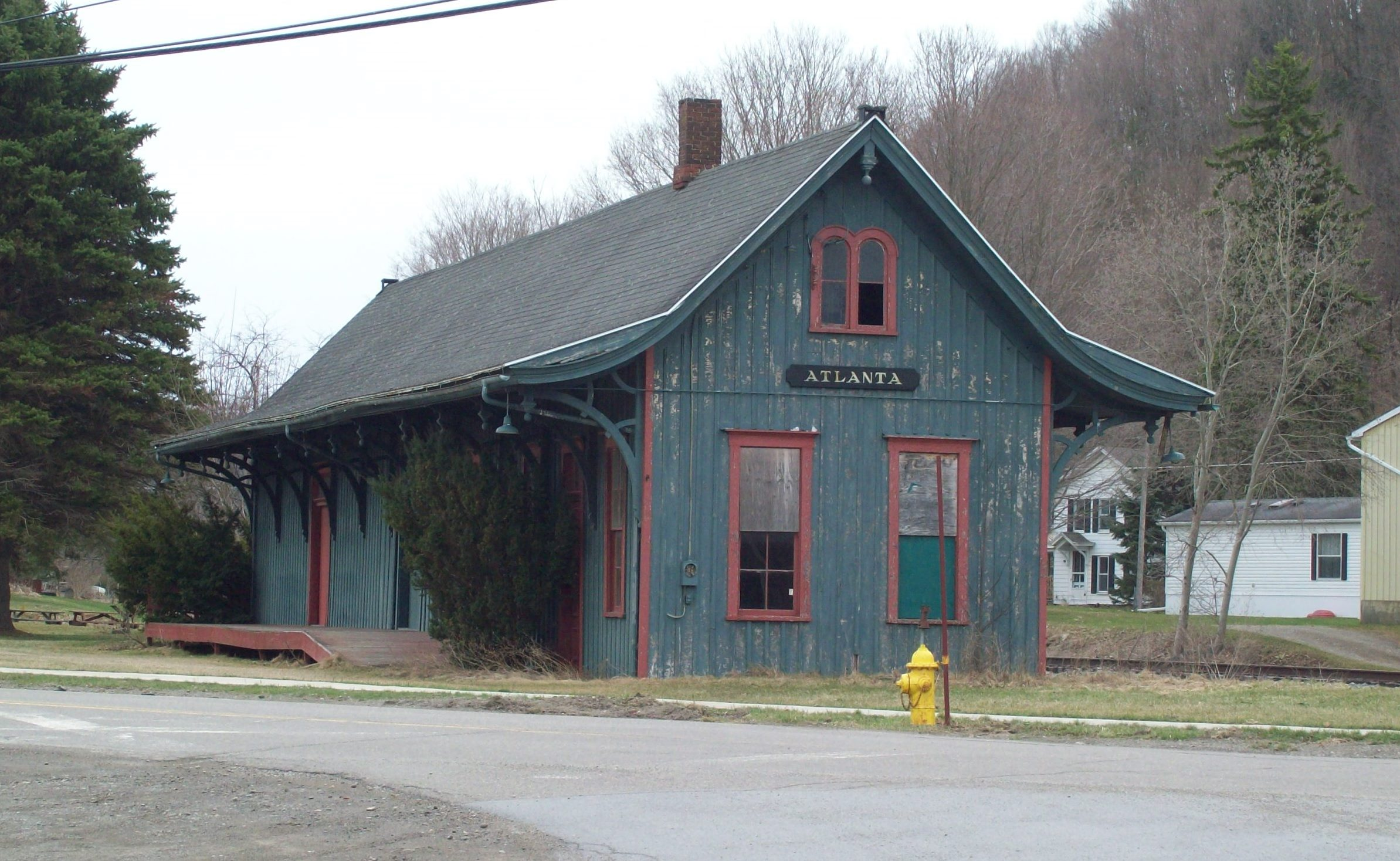
Railroad station at Atlanta, NY, in April 2011

- Atlanta – A hamlet in the northeast part of the town at the junction of County Roads 36 (East Main Street) and 39 (University Avenue) was formerly known as "Bloods." It was founded around 1840. The Cohocton River changes from east-flowing to south-flowing at Atlanta. The Presbyterian Church of Atlanta was listed on the National Register of Historic Places in 2010. An 1893 railway travel guide describes it as follows: "320 miles from New York; Single ticket, $7.68; Special ticket, $6.95.

This village is also in the Cohocton Valley. Formerly called Bloods, it was thought that it might prove more prosperous, and grow fully as well, if given a more pleasing name. Atlanta is a shipping point for an abundant supply of grapes which are grown around the village of Naples."

- Bowles Corners – A location in the northwest corner of the town on NY-21 and County Road 37.
- Cohocton – A village adjacent to Interstate 390 in the south part of the town. For a period in the 19th century, it was called "Liberty."
- Kirkwood – A hamlet northeast of Cohocton village on NY-371.
- North Cohocton – A hamlet in the northeast part of the town at the junction of NY-21 and NY-371. The community dates from before 1850.

== Notable person ==
- Charlotte Fowler Wells, phrenologist, publisher
