= Silas Wheeler =

Silas Wheeler (March 7, 1752 or 1753 at Concord, Massachusetts – November 28, 1828 at Wheeler, New York) called "Captain", was a soldier in the army of the American Revolution, and the founder of the town of Wheeler, Steuben County, New York.

== Revolutionary War ==
He was fought at the Battle of Bunker Hill, with the Rhode Island Brigade, and marched with Benedict Arnold from Cambridge to Quebec in 1775. Many starved to death along the way, and others deserted. After several days with no food, a group of Indians brought the small army a dog - he said it was the sweetest food he had ever eaten. In the Battle of Quebec he was captured by the British, and in prison he contracted smallpox. Wheeler became bald from the illness and remained permanently so. After his exchange, he returned to Rhode Island, and re-enlisted on a privateer. He was later captured on the high seas by the British and was sent to a prison at the naval base at Kinsale, Ireland. He was treated particularly harshly, for his participation in the Gaspee Affair in 1772. After a year and a half he was offered help from the Irish orator and patriot Henry Grattan, if he could escape. This he and two others did, and Grattan gave them passports, protection from impressment, and passage to Dunkirk, France, and thence to America.

After the war he moved his family to Albany County, New York, where he appears in the first U.S. Census, in 1790. He went ahead of his family in 1798 to Steuben County, where he founded the town of Wheeler, NY and resettled his family there in 1800.

== Family life ==
Silas married Sarah Gardner (born in Rhode Island) and they had two daughters: Ruth, who married Nathan Rose, and Sarah, who married William Holmes. His son, Grattan Henry Wheeler, named for Silas' rescuer Henry Grattan, served as a U.S. Representative from New York.
