= New York State Route 390 =

State highway in Monroe County, New York, US

New York State Route 390
- Rochester Outer Loop
- Map of Rochester with NY 390 highlighted in red

Route information
- Maintained by NYSDOT
- Length: 8.00 mi (12.87 km)
- Existed: March 18, 1980–present
- Restrictions: No commercial vehicles north of exit 26

Major junctions
- South end: I-390 / I-490 in Gates
- NY 104 in Greece
- North end: Lake Ontario State Parkway in Greece

Location
- Country: United States
- State: New York
- Counties: Monroe

Highway system
- New York Highways; Interstate; US; State; Reference; Parkways
| ← I-390 | → NY 390A |

New York State Route 390 (NY 390) is a north–south freeway located along the western edge of the city of Rochester, New York, in the United States. The route, a northward continuation of Interstate 390 (I-390), extends for 8.00 miles (12.87 km) from I-490 in Gates to the Lake Ontario State Parkway in Greece, less than 1 mile (1.6 km) from the Lake Ontario shoreline. Between I-490 and NY 104, NY 390 makes up the north–south segment of the northwest quadrant of the Rochester Outer Loop, a series of freeways encircling Rochester. At NY 104, the Outer Loop departs NY 390 and follows NY 104 east into the city.

The freeway was constructed in stages from the 1960s to the 1980s, with the first segment—between I-490 and NY 31—opening to traffic c. 1963. At the time, it was part of NY 47, which followed the completed portions of the Outer Loop from Gates to Irondequoit. An extension of the freeway north to U.S. Route 104 (US 104; now NY 104) was opened to traffic in the early 1970s. NY 47 was eliminated in 1980, giving way to NY 390 from I-490 to NY 104. NY 390 was extended to its current length in the early 1980s.

== Route description ==
NY 390 begins at the point where I-390 northbound crosses over I-490 eastbound in the center of a complex interchange between the two in Gates. Due to the setup of the junction, the northbound and southbound roadways, both two lanes wide, are initially set about 250 yards (229 m) apart. The highway heads through the remainder of the exit, passing over the left exit ramp from I-490 west to I-390 south heading northbound and under the ramp linking I-490 east to NY 390 north southbound and crossing over I-490 westbound. North of the junction, the median narrows to a more standard width as NY 390 widens to six lanes and connects to NY 31 (Lyell Avenue). The expressway proceeds north through neighborhoods equally residential and industrial, crossing over both the former right-of-way of the CSX Transportation-owned Falls Road Secondary Track and the Erie Canal prior to meeting Lexington Avenue via a modified trumpet interchange.

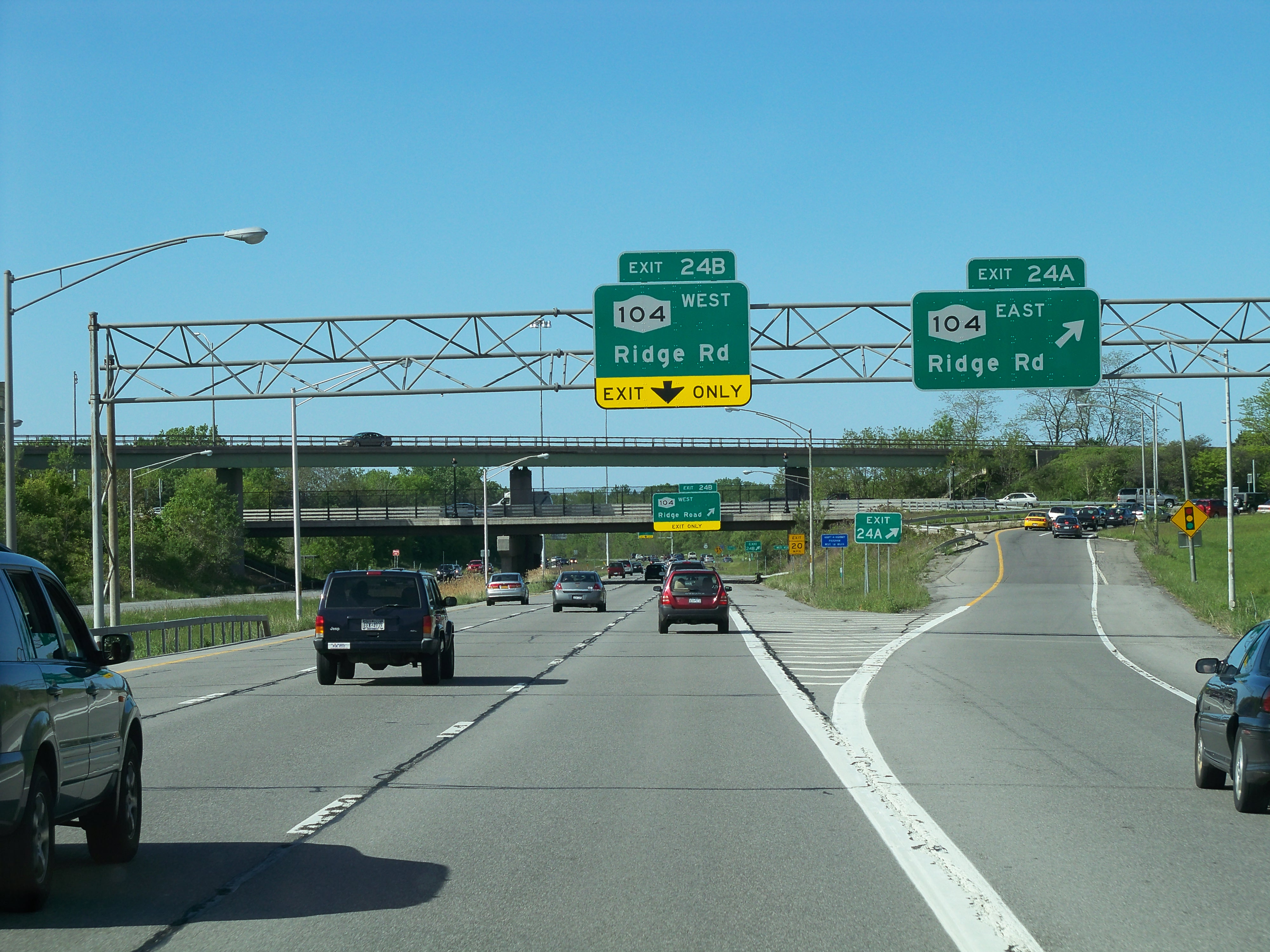
The junction of NY 390 and NY 104 (West Ridge Road) in Greece

From Lexington Avenue, where NY 390 passes into the town of Greece, north to NY 104, NY 390 runs parallel to the western edge of Eastman Business Park, the large production and distribution complex owned and maintained by Eastman Kodak. Midway between the Lexington Avenue and West Ridge Road exits, NY 390 encounters Ridgeway Avenue via a partial diamond interchange. Just north of Ridgeway Avenue, the expressway crosses a small, narrow strip of land that lies within the Rochester city limits, a carryover from when the Erie Canal occupied this tract and entered the city decades before. North of the strip, NY 390 curves to the northeast, passing along the west side of the industrial park and the eastern edge of a residential yet wooded area to reach NY 104. Heading northbound, it splits into two halves, with exit 24A connecting to NY 104 east and exit 24B linking to NY 104 west.

Past NY 104, the roadway surface shifts from pavement to concrete as the freeway heads generally northward through primarily residential neighborhoods. This section northwards to the Lake Ontario State Parkway is designated the "Assemblyman Roger J. Robach Memorial Lakeway" by state law. The next exit, with Vintage Lane 1.5 miles (2.4 km) to the north-northeast of NY 104, is the highway's last as a six-lane freeway. Here, it narrows to four lanes—two in both directions—before continuing onward to meet NY 18 (Latta Road) at a conventional diamond interchange. At this point, all commercial vehicles are forced to exit NY 390 due to a similar restriction on the Lake Ontario State Parkway 1 mile (1.6 km) to the north. Outside of a small pocket of development near Greece Arcadia High and Middle Schools, the remainder of the freeway crosses open, sparsely developed areas of Greece. NY 390 curves to the northeast for its final 0.5 miles (0.8 km) before ending at a trumpet interchange with the parkway 1 mile (1.6 km) from the shore of Lake Ontario.

== History ==
The 2-mile (3.2 km) segment of the Rochester Outer Loop between NY 33A and NY 31 was completed c. 1963. It was originally designated as part of NY 47, which had followed the parallel Howard Road to the west prior to the freeway's construction. Work on an extension north to US 104 (now NY 104) began in the mid-1960s and was completed in the early 1970s. The freeway officially became part of NY 47 on January 1, 1970, when the route was extended northward over the then-proposed Outer Loop to a new terminus at the Lake Ontario State Parkway. In actuality, however, NY 47 never extended any farther north than NY 104, which served as the freeway's northern terminus throughout the 1970s.

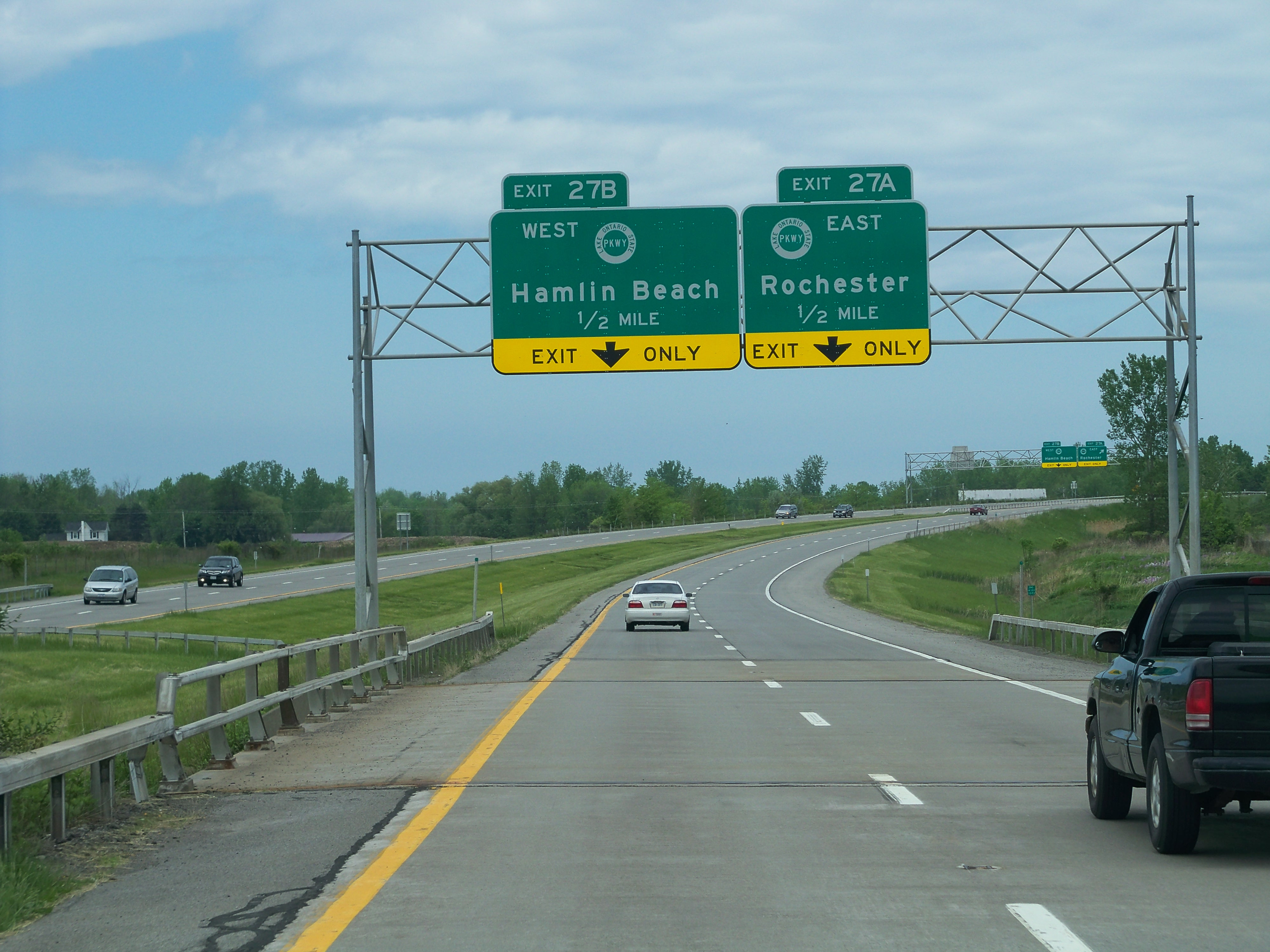
Approaching the Lake Ontario Parkway on NY 390 north

In the late 1970s, the state of New York submitted a proposal to the American Association of State Highway and Transportation Officials that would substantially alter how the Outer Loop was numbered. As part of the plan, the NY 47 designation would be eliminated while the northwestern section of the Outer Loop—from I-490 in Gates to the proposed northern terminus at the Lake Ontario Parkway in Greece—would become the northernmost part of I-390. Most of the proposed changes took effect on March 18, 1980, when NY 47 was eliminated; however, I-390 was modified to end at its junction with I-490. In its place, the Gates–Greece leg of the Outer Loop was assigned NY 390. The NY 390 designation was extended northward to its current terminus in the early 1980s when the segment of the Outer Loop between NY 104 and the Lake Ontario State Parkway was completed.

The highway began experiencing dramatic increases in traffic, especially after the highway was extended to the Lake Ontario State Parkway post 1980's. As Greece and towns on the northwest side of Rochester have expanded, NY-390 emerged as the primary highway link southward. The interchange of NY/I-390 and I-490 currently serves over 200,000 cars daily — compared to 25,000 when it was designed and opened in the 1960s — and regularly has heavy congestion during the morning and evening rush hours. Major slowdowns on 390 are often influenced by the interchange at 490 and Lyell Avenue.

Starting in 2010, the New York State Department of Transportation began soliciting ideas on how to improve the junction. The overall project includes four phases, with $150 million in state and federal funding. The project launched in May 2017, with the replacement of the (NY-31) Lyell Avenue Bridge (which was completed in July 2018).

== Exit list ==
Exit numbers continue sequentially from those of Interstate 390. The entire route is in Monroe County.

| Location | mi | km | Exit | Destinations | Notes |
|---|---|---|---|---|---|
| Gates | 0.00 | 0.00 | – | I-390 south – Rochester Airport | Continuation south |
| Gates | 0.00 | 0.00 | 20 | I-490 – Rochester, Buffalo | Signed as exits 20A (east) and 20B (west); exit 9A on I-490 |
| Gates | 0.48 | 0.77 | 21 | NY 31 (Lyell Avenue) | |
| Gates | 1.56 | 2.51 | 22 | Lexington Avenue | |
| Town of Greece | 2.43 | 3.91 | 23 | Ridgeway Avenue | |
| Town of Greece | 3.57 | 5.75 | 24 | NY 104 (West Ridge Road) – Greece | Signed as exits 24A (east) and 24B (west) northbound; former US 104 |
| Town of Greece | 5.29 | 8.51 | 25 | Vintage Lane | |
| Town of Greece | 6.81 | 10.96 | 26 | NY 18 (Latta Road) | All trucks must exit |
| Town of Greece | 8.00 | 12.87 | 27 | Lake Ontario State Parkway – Rochester, Hamlin Beach State Park | Northern terminus; signed as exits 27A (east) and 27B (west) |
1.000 mi = 1.609 km; 1.000 km = 0.621 mi: Incomplete access

== See also ==
- See Interstate 390 for exits 1–19
