= Presbyterian Church of Atlanta =

Historic church in New York, United States

- U.S. National Register of Historic Places
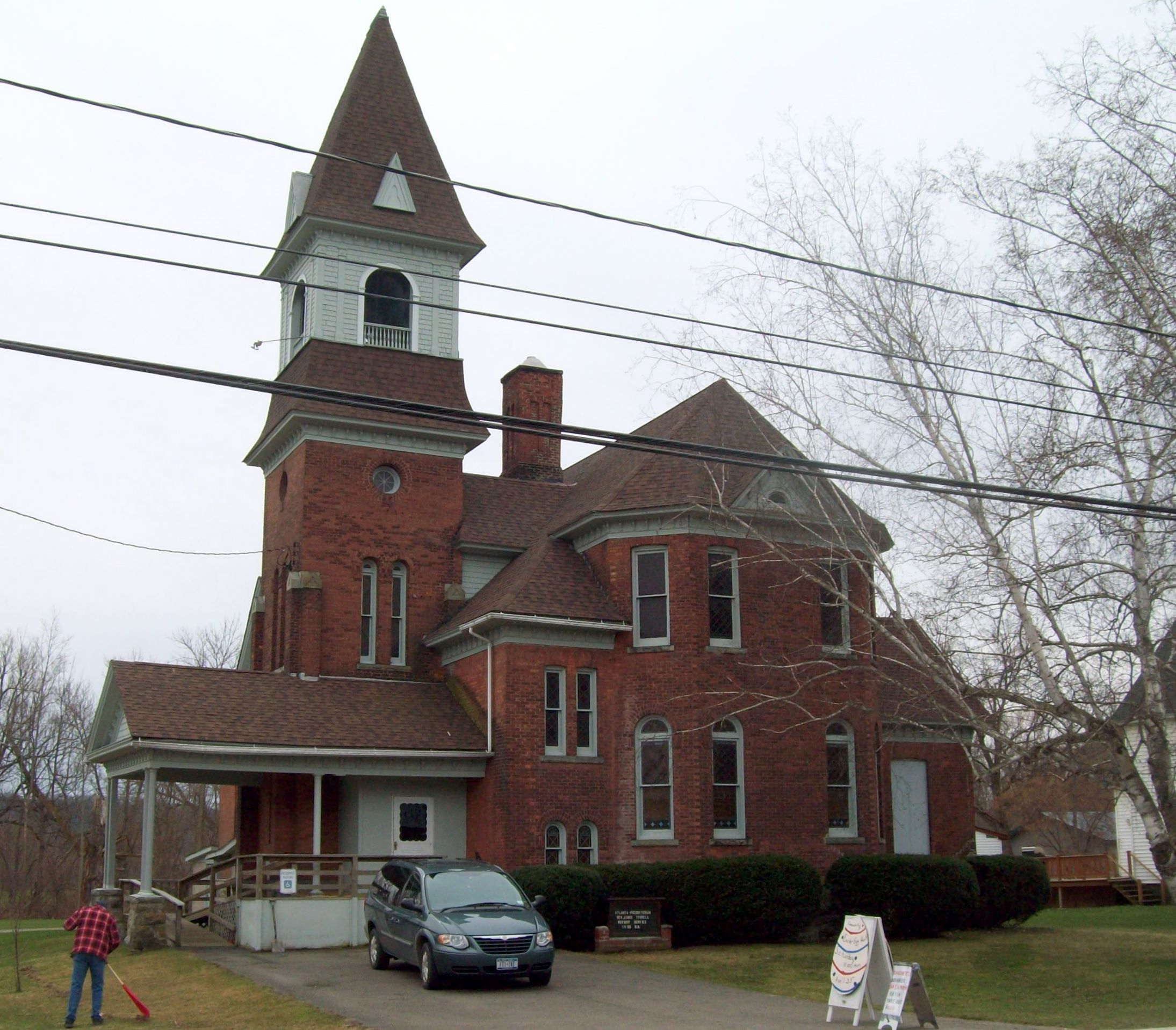
- Presbyterian Church of Atlanta, April 2011

- Location within New York Location within the United States
- Location: 2 Main Street, Atlanta, New York
- Coordinates: 42°33′13.79″N 77°28′23.33″W
- Area: 1.4 acres (0.57 ha)
- Built: 1895
- Architect: Otis Dockstader
- Architectural style: Queen Anne, Gothic Revival
- NRHP reference No.: 10000030
- Added to NRHP: February 17, 2010

Presbyterian Church of Atlanta is a historic Presbyterian church located at Atlanta in Steuben County, New York, United States. It was built in 1895 and is a Queen Anne style building constructed of red pressed brick over a limestone basement. The architect was Otis Dockstader of Elmira. The interior is designed on the Akron Plan. Also on the property is a former horse shed that was converted in the 1920s for use as a Sunday School and Boy Scout facility. Founded after a devastating fire destroyed most of the downtown area of the village, the church has always served a broad cross section of the community. Having nearly closed the church is now experiencing a period of renewal. Services are at 11:00 AM on Sundays.

It was listed on the National Register of Historic Places in 2010.
