= Fremont, Steuben County, New York =

Fremont, New York
- Town
- Location within the state of New York
- Coordinates: 42°23′39″N 77°36′33″W
- Country: United States
- State: New York
- County: Steuben

Area
  - Total: 32.4 sq mi (83.8 km^{2})
  - Land: 32.2 sq mi (83.5 km^{2})
  - Water: 0.12 sq mi (0.3 km^{2})
- Elevation: 1,745 ft (532 m)

Population (2020)
  - Total: 898 ▼
  - Density: 30/sq mi (11.5/km^{2})
- Time zone: UTC-5 (Eastern (EST))
  - Summer (DST): UTC-4 (EDT)
- FIPS code: 36-27551
- GNIS feature ID: 0978975
- Website: www.townoffremontny.com

Fremont is a town in Steuben County, New York, United States. The population was 898 at the 2020 census. The town is named after General John Fremont.

The Town of Fremont is in the western part of Steuben County, northeast of the city of Hornell.

== History ==
The town was formed in 1854 from parts of four other towns: Dansville, Hornellsville, Howard and Wayland.

== Geography ==
According to the United States Census Bureau, the town has a total area of 32.4 square miles (84 km^{2}), of which 32.2 square miles (83 km^{2}) is land and 0.1 square miles (0.26 km^{2}) (0.40%) is water.

The Southern Tier Expressway (Interstate 86 and New York State Highway 17) and New York State Route 21 pass through the south part of the town.

== Demographics ==
Historical population
Census	Pop.	Note	%±
1860	1,117		—
1870	1,119		0.2%
1880	1,277		14.1%
1890	1,047		−18.0%
1900	1,033		−1.3%
1910	860		−16.7%
1920	645		−25.0%
1930	697		8.1%
1940	739		6.0%
1950	782		5.8%
1960	779		−0.4%
1970	884		13.5%
1980	865		−2.1%
1990	912		5.4%
2000	964		5.7%
2010	1,008		4.6%
2020	898		−10.9%
2021 (est.)	887		−1.2%
U.S. Decennial Census

As of the census of 2000, there were 964 people, 395 households, and 278 families residing in the town. The population density was 29.9 inhabitants per square mile (11.5/km^{2}). There were 458 housing units at an average density of 14.2 per square mile (5.5/km^{2}). The racial makeup of the town was 99.27% White, 0.21% Native American, 0.10% Asian, 0.10% from other races, and 0.31% from two or more races.

There were 395 households, out of which 29.4% had children under the age of 18 living with them, 58.7% were married couples living together, 7.3% had a female householder with no husband present, and 29.6% were non-families. 24.8% of all households were made up of individuals, and 10.9% had someone living alone who was 65 years of age or older. The average household size was 2.44 and the average family size was 2.87.

In the town, the population was spread out, with 24.1% under the age of 18, 6.7% from 18 to 24, 28.3% from 25 to 44, 26.9% from 45 to 64, and 14.0% who were 65 years of age or older. The median age was 39 years. For every 100 females, there were 101.7 males. For every 100 females age 18 and over, there were 101.7 males.

The median income for a household in the town was $33,750, and the median income for a family was $40,714. Males had a median income of $31,250 versus $24,688 for females. The per capita income for the town was $18,584. About 10.2% of families and 13.3% of the population were below the poverty line, including 20.8% of those under age 18 and 11.9% of those age 65 or over.

== Communities and locations in the Town of Fremont ==
- Big Creek – A hamlet in the southeast part of the town, south of the Interstate.
- Fremont – The hamlet of Fremont is on NY-21 in the southwest of the town.
- Haskinsville – A hamlet in the northeastern part of the town on NY-21.
- Jobs Corner – A hamlet in the eastern part of the town by the junction of County Roads 54 and 55. Jobs Corner is the location of the first pioneer settlement in the town.
- Seeley Creek – A tributary of the Canisteo River in the south part of the town.
- Stephens Mills
