= Wheeler, New York =

Wheeler
- Town
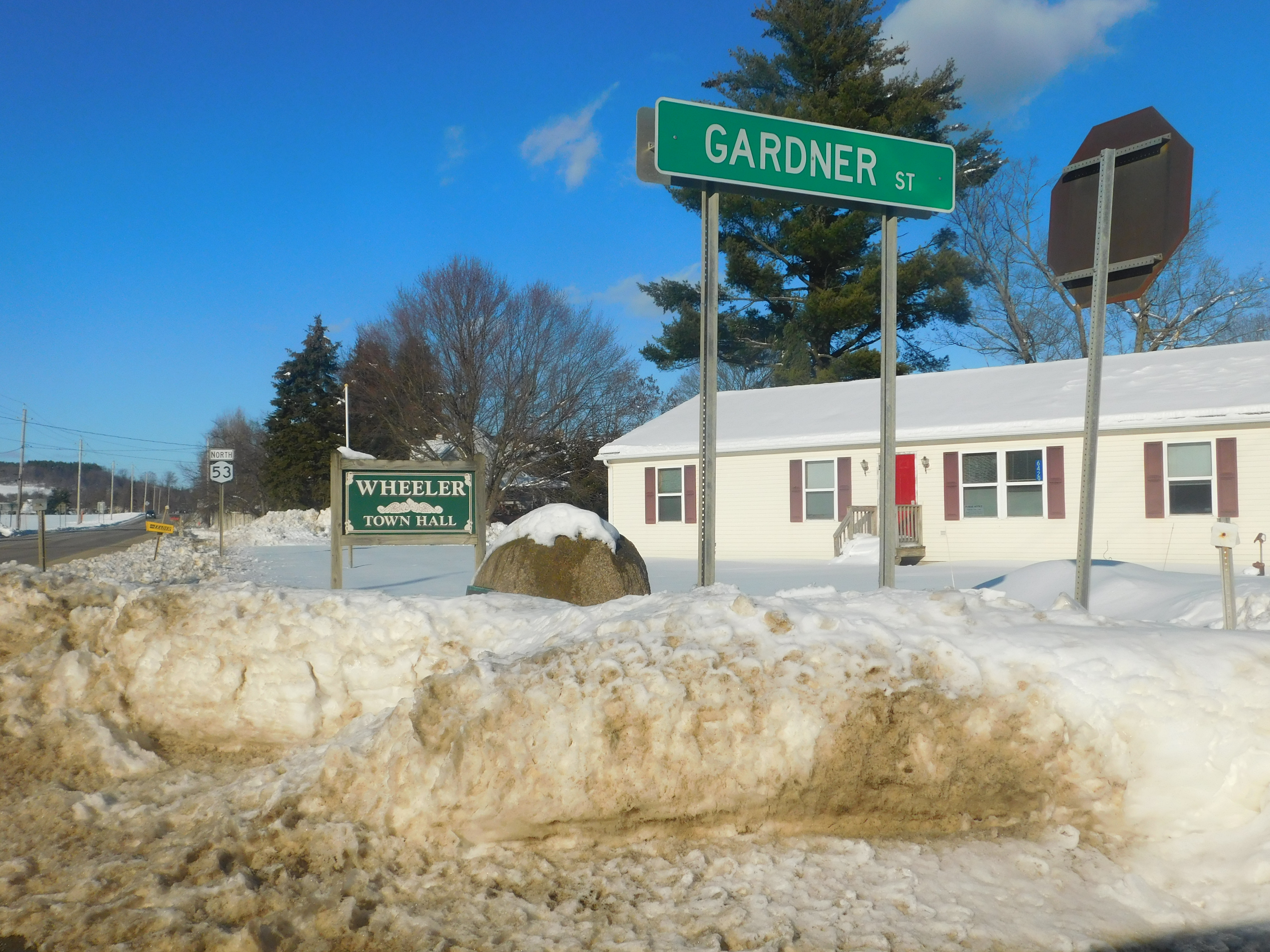
- The Wheeler town hall on NY 53.

- Location within the state of New York
- Coordinates: 42°26′39″N 77°20′10″W
- Country: United States
- State: New York
- County: Steuben

Area
  - Total: 46.13 sq mi (119.47 km^{2})
  - Land: 46.07 sq mi (119.31 km^{2})
  - Water: 0.062 sq mi (0.16 km^{2})
- Elevation: 1,627 ft (496 m)

Population (2020)
  - Total: 1,136 ▼
  - Estimate (2021): 1,134
  - Density: 27.2/sq mi (10.49/km^{2})
- Time zone: UTC-5 (Eastern (EST))
  - Summer (DST): UTC-4 (EDT)
- FIPS code: 36-81457
- GNIS feature ID: 0979634

Wheeler is a town in Steuben County, New York, United States. The population was 1,136 at the 2020 census. The town is named after Captain Silas Wheeler, an early settler.

The Town of Wheeler is in the northern part of the county, north of Bath.

== History ==
The town was organized in 1820 from the Towns of Bath and Prattsburgh. Wheeler lost some of its territory to Avoca (1843) and Urbana (1839).

The town was at its peak population in 1850: 1,471.

== Geography ==
According to the United States Census Bureau, the town has a total area of 46.1 square miles (119 km^{2}), of which 46.1 square miles (119 km^{2}) is land and 0.04 square miles (0.10 km^{2}) (0.09%) is water.

New York State Route 53 is a north–south highway through the town.

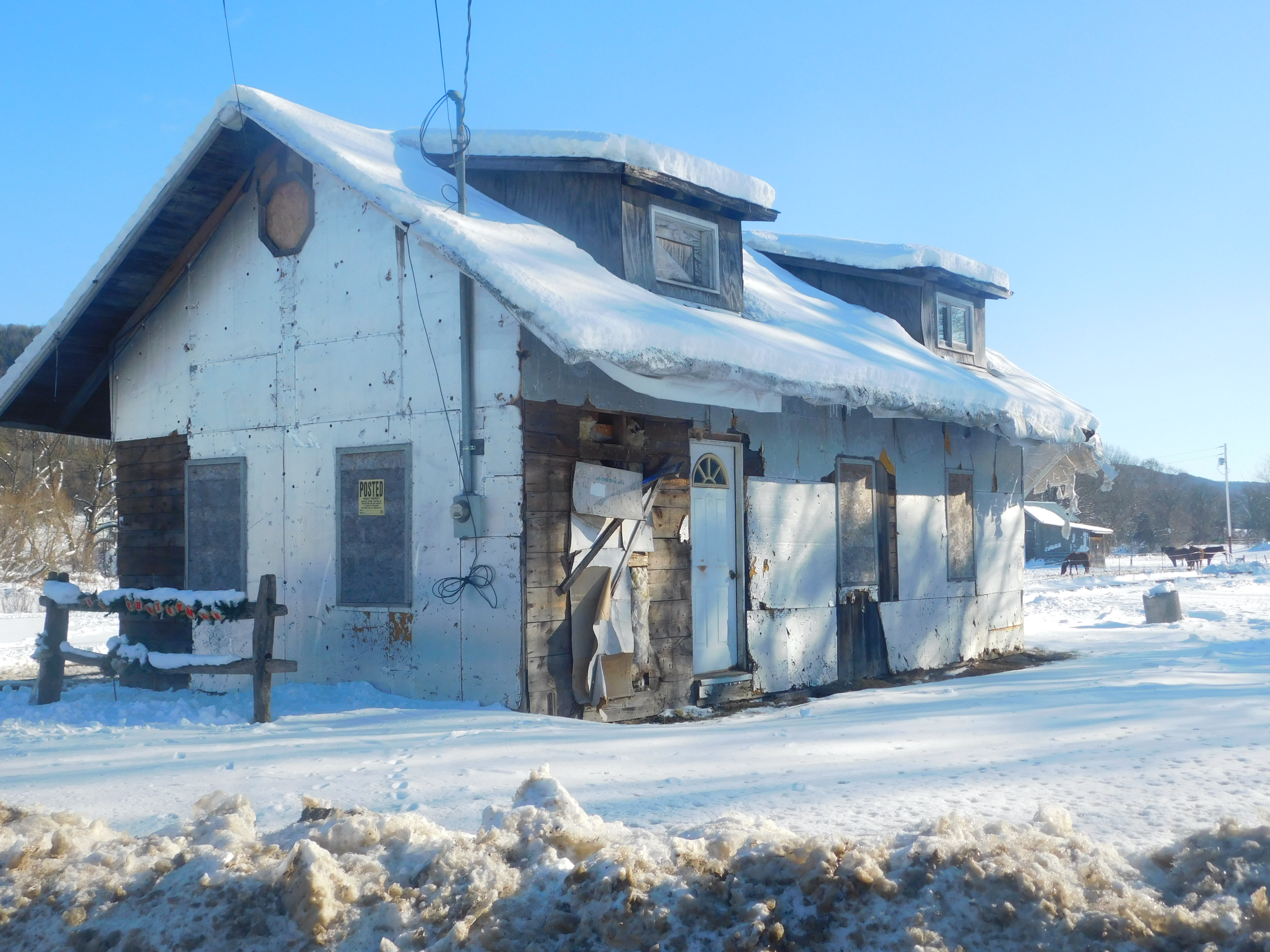
The former Kanona & Prattsburgh station in Wheeler

From c. 1889–1961, Wheeler was located on a railroad. The Kanona & Prattsburgh Railroad Company, the Kanona & Prattsburgh Railway Company, and the Prattsburgh Railway Corporation during the period operated an 11.44 single-track standard-gauge railroad from a connection with the Erie Railroad at Kanona to Prattsburgh. Intermediate stations included Wheeler, Beans, and Stickneys, though Wheeler was the only one with a full-time agent (until c.1930).

== Demographics ==
Historical population
Census	Pop.	Note	%±
1820	798		—
1830	1,389		74.1%
1840	1,294		−6.8%
1850	1,471		13.7%
1860	1,376		−6.5%
1870	1,330		−3.3%
1880	1,424		7.1%
1890	1,285		−9.8%
1900	1,188		−7.5%
1910	959		−19.3%
1920	808		−15.7%
1930	677		−16.2%
1940	690		1.9%
1950	653		−5.4%
1960	766		17.3%
1970	858		12.0%
1980	1,014		18.2%
1990	1,084		6.9%
2000	1,261		16.3%
2010	1,260		−0.1%
2020	1,136		−9.8%
2021 (est.)	1,134		−0.2%
U.S. Decennial Census

As of the census of 2000, there were 1,263 people, 437 households, and 335 families residing in the town. The population density was 27.4 people per square mile (10.6 people/km^{2}). There were 586 housing units at an average density of 12.7 per square mile (4.9/km^{2}). The racial makeup of the town was 96.36% White, 1.27% African American, 0.32% Native American, 0.40% Asian, 0.79% from other races, and 0.87% from two or more races. Hispanic or Latino of any race were 1.66% of the population.

There were 437 households, out of which 37.5% had children under the age of 18 living with them, 61.8% were married couples living together, 9.4% had a female householder with no husband present, and 23.3% were non-families. 19.2% of all households were made up of individuals, and 7.1% had someone living alone who was 65 years of age or older. The average household size was 2.87 and the average family size was 3.21.

In the town, the population was spread out, with 30.0% under the age of 18, 7.4% from 18 to 24, 27.6% from 25 to 44, 25.5% from 45 to 64, and 9.5% who were 65 years of age or older. The median age was 36 years. For every 100 females, there were 103.4 males. For every 100 females age 18 and over, there were 101.4 males.

The median income for a household in the town was $35,806, and the median income for a family was $37,632. Males had a median income of $27,137 versus $21,750 for females. The per capita income for the town was $14,555. About 13.6% of families and 17.9% of the population were below the poverty line, including 28.4% of those under age 18 and 8.3% of those age 65 or over.

The 1890 population was 1,084.

== Notable person ==
- Grattan H. Wheeler, former US Representative

== Communities and locations in the Town of Wheeler ==
- Bean Station – A hamlet at the north town line on NY-53.
- Dinehart – A hamlet northeast of Wheeler hamlet on NY-53.
- Five-Mile Creek – A stream that partly parallels NY-53.
- Marshalls – A hamlet southwest of Wheeler hamlet on NY-53.
- Mitchellsville – A hamlet in the southeast part of the town on County Road 13.
- Renchans – A hamlet northeast of Wheeler hamlet on NY-53 at County Road 13.
- Stickneys – A hamlet in the northeast part of the town on NY-53.
- Wheeler – The hamlet of Wheeler on NY-53.
