= Avoca, New York =

Avoca
- Town
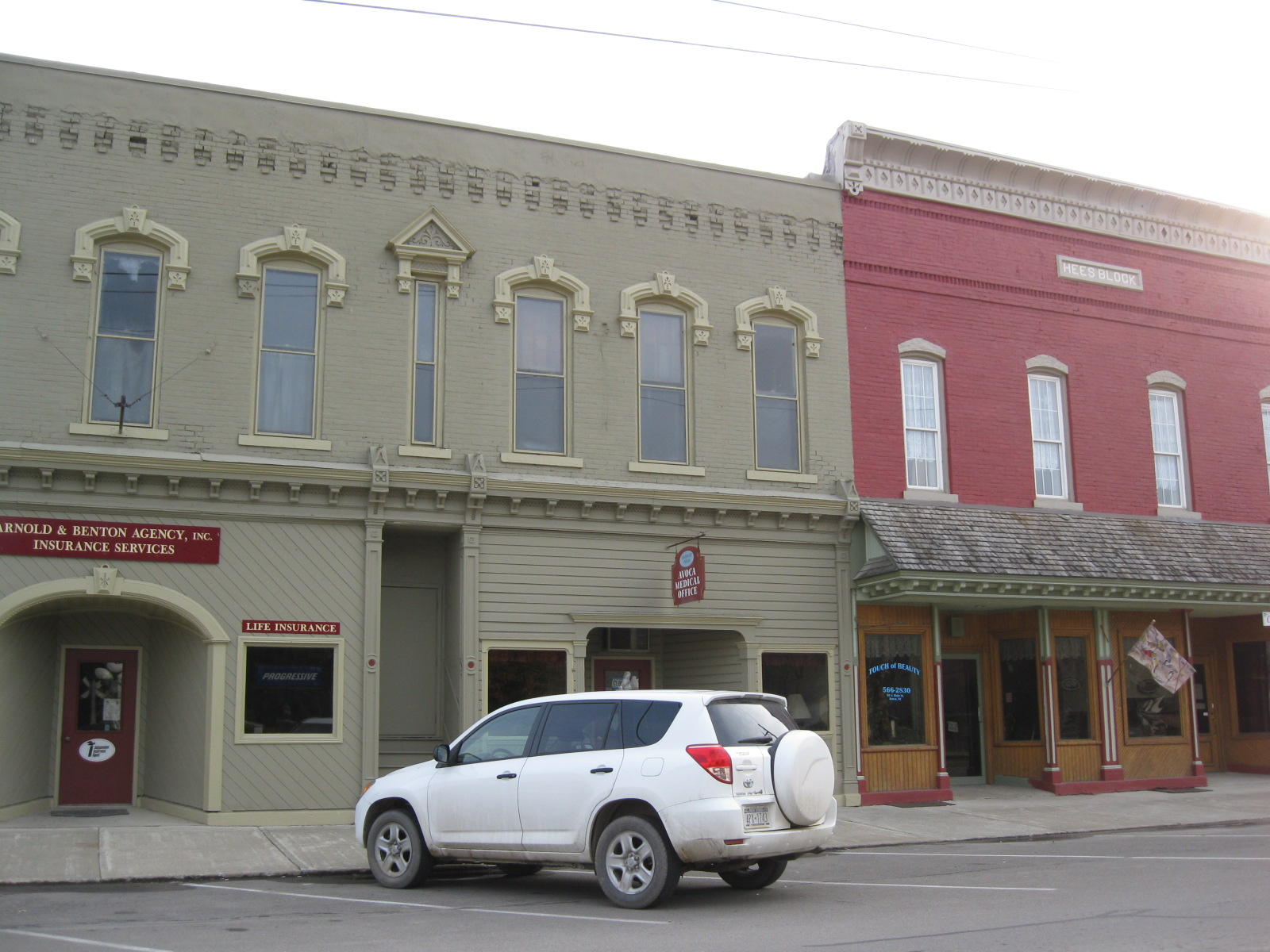

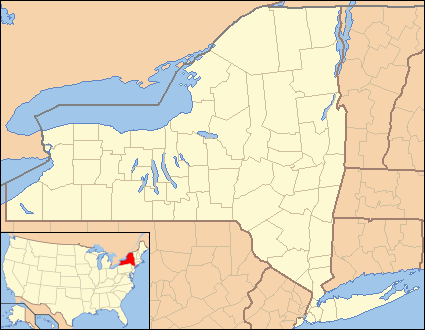
- Location of Avoca in New York
- Coordinates: 42°24′37″N 77°25′32″W
- Country: United States
- State: New York
- County: Steuben County

Area
  - Total: 36.29 sq mi (93.99 km^{2})
  - Land: 36.25 sq mi (93.88 km^{2})
  - Water: 0.042 sq mi (0.11 km^{2})

Population (2020)
  - Total: 1,996 ▼
  - Estimate (2021): 1,972
  - Density: 60.3/sq mi (23.29/km^{2})
- Time zone: UTC-5 (Eastern (EST))
  - Summer (DST): UTC-4 (EDT)
- FIPS code: 36-101-03342

Avoca is a town in Steuben County, New York, United States. The population was 1,996 at the 2020 census.

The Town of Avoca has a village named Avoca. The town is in the northern part of the county, northwest of Bath, New York.

== History ==
The first settler arrived around 1794. At that time, the area was home to the Seneca Indians. The town is named for the Thomas Moore poem about Avoca in Ireland. The town was formed from parts of four other towns in 1843. Those towns contributing to the new town were: Bath, Cohocton, Howard, and Wheeler.

== Geography ==
According to the United States Census Bureau, the town has a total area of 36.3 square miles (94.0 km^{2}), of which 36.3 square miles (94.0 km^{2}) is land and 0.04 square mile (0.1 km^{2}) (0.06%) is water.

Interstate 86, Interstate 390 and New York State Route 415 pass through the town.

The Gang Mills (Painted Post) to Wayland Line of the B&H Rail Corp. passes through the Village of Avoca and hamlet of Wallace in Town of Avoca. From c. 1853 to 1956, the Corning-Rochester line of the Erie Railroad passed through Avoca and Wallace. This line, as far as Livonia, NY, was removed in 1956 by order of the ICC, at Erie's request. From 1882 to 1963, Avoca and Wallace were also served by the New York (Hoboken) to Buffalo Main Line of the Delaware, Lackawanna & Western Railroad (and its Erie Lackawanna successor). This through route was also severed in 1963 by order of the ICC, at EL's request. The former DL&W route in the Town of Avoca is now operated by the B&H Rail Corp.

The Conhocton River flows through the town past Wallace, Bloomerville, and Avoca village.

=== Climate ===
Avoca has a hot-summer humid continental climate (Dfa), as mean July temperatures are just above the 71.6 °F (22.0 °C) threshold needed for a hot-summer climate.

Climate data for Avoca, New York (1991–2020 normals, extremes 1901-present, snow totals missing 1996-2007 data, 1971-1990 snow depth)
Month	Jan	Feb	Mar	Apr	May	Jun	Jul	Aug	Sep	Oct	Nov	Dec	Year
Record high °F (°C)	69 (21)	76 (24)	85 (29)	93 (34)	93 (34)	99 (37)	103 (39)	102 (39)	100 (38)	91 (33)	81 (27)	71 (22)	103 (39)
Mean maximum °F (°C)	57.7 (14.3)	57.0 (13.9)	68.0 (20.0)	81.3 (27.4)	88.0 (31.1)	90.5 (32.5)	92.8 (33.8)	90.5 (32.5)	87.6 (30.9)	78.6 (25.9)	69.1 (20.6)	59.6 (15.3)	94.3 (34.6)
Mean daily maximum °F (°C)	34.5 (1.4)	37.6 (3.1)	46.5 (8.1)	59.9 (15.5)	71.1 (21.7)	78.7 (25.9)	83.5 (28.6)	81.3 (27.4)	74.0 (23.3)	61.9 (16.6)	50.0 (10.0)	39.2 (4.0)	59.9 (15.5)
Daily mean °F (°C)	27.1 (−2.7)	29.5 (−1.4)	37.4 (3.0)	49.3 (9.6)	60.1 (15.6)	68.1 (20.1)	72.8 (22.7)	71.0 (21.7)	63.7 (17.6)	52.3 (11.3)	41.9 (5.5)	32.4 (0.2)	50.5 (10.3)
Mean daily minimum °F (°C)	19.8 (−6.8)	21.4 (−5.9)	28.4 (−2.0)	38.8 (3.8)	49.1 (9.5)	57.5 (14.2)	62.2 (16.8)	60.6 (15.9)	53.5 (11.9)	42.7 (5.9)	33.7 (0.9)	25.7 (−3.5)	41.1 (5.1)
Mean minimum °F (°C)	0.6 (−17.4)	3.6 (−15.8)	11.0 (−11.7)	24.7 (−4.1)	34.7 (1.5)	44.1 (6.7)	50.9 (10.5)	48.8 (9.3)	38.7 (3.7)	28.7 (−1.8)	18.0 (−7.8)	9.1 (−12.7)	−1.6 (−18.7)
Record low °F (°C)	−21 (−29)	−19 (−28)	−4 (−20)	8 (−13)	27 (−3)	34 (1)	43 (6)	38 (3)	29 (−2)	19 (−7)	5 (−15)	−13 (−25)	−21 (−29)
Average precipitation inches (mm)	2.59 (66)	2.07 (53)	2.76 (70)	3.25 (83)	3.26 (83)	3.80 (97)	3.60 (91)	3.86 (98)	4.14 (105)	3.71 (94)	2.85 (72)	2.79 (71)	38.91 (988)
Average snowfall inches (cm)	11.6 (29)	10.9 (28)	9.6 (24)	0.8 (2.0)	0 (0)	0 (0)	0 (0)	0 (0)	0 (0)	0.6 (1.5)	3.0 (7.6)	7.7 (20)	42.7 (108)
Average extreme snow depth inches (cm)	6 (15)	6 (15)	3 (7.6)	2 (5.1)	0 (0)	0 (0)	0 (0)	0 (0)	0 (0)	0 (0)	2 (5.1)	4 (10)	9 (23)
Average precipitation days (≥ 0.01 in)	13	11	12	12	13	13	11	11	10	11	10	12	139
Average snowy days (≥ 0.1 in)	9	8	5	1	0	0	0	0	0	0	2	6	31
Source: NOAA

== Demographics ==
Historical population
Census	Pop.	Note	%±
1850	1,574		—
1860	1,835		16.6%
1870	1,740		−5.2%
1880	1,843		5.9%
1890	2,242		21.6%
1900	2,125		−5.2%
1910	2,140		0.7%
1920	1,888		−11.8%
1930	1,788		−5.3%
1940	1,789		0.1%
1950	1,755		−1.9%
1960	2,041		16.3%
1970	2,059		0.9%
1980	2,225		8.1%
1990	2,269		2.0%
2000	2,314		2.0%
2010	2,264		−2.2%
2020	1,996		−11.8%
2021 (est.)	1,972	▼	−1.2%
U.S. Decennial Census

As of the census of 2000, there were 2,314 people, 873 households, and 607 families residing in the town. The population density was 63.8 inhabitants per square mile (24.6/km^{2}). There were 1,001 housing units at an average density of 27.6 per square mile (10.7/km^{2}). The racial makeup of the town was 97.45% White, 1.04% Black or African American, 0.39% Native American, 0.30% Asian, 0.30% from other races, and 0.52% from two or more races. Hispanic or Latino of any race were 0.82% of the population.

There were 873 households, out of which 36.0% had children under the age of 18 living with them, 51.4% were married couples living together, 12.1% had a female householder with no husband present, and 30.4% were non-families. 25.3% of all households were made up of individuals, and 9.3% had someone living alone who was 65 years of age or older. The average household size was 2.62 and the average family size was 3.10.

In the town, the population was spread out, with 29.8% under the age of 18, 6.6% from 18 to 24, 26.7% from 25 to 44, 23.4% from 45 to 64, and 13.5% who were 65 years of age or older. The median age was 36 years. For every 100 females, there were 103.9 males. For every 100 females age 18 and over, there were 103.1 males.

The median income for a household in the town was $31,333, and the median income for a family was $33,566. Males had a median income of $27,194 versus $25,500 for females. The per capita income for the town was $14,343. About 9.2% of families and 13.6% of the population were below the poverty line, including 20.2% of those under age 18 and 6.5% of those age 65 or over.

== Communities and locations in the Town of Avoca ==
- Avoca – The Village of Avoca is in the southeast part of the town on NY Route 415.
- Bloomerville – A hamlet northwest of Avoca village on NY Route 415.
- Castle Creek – A stream flowing past Bloomerville to the Cohocton River.
- Greenville – A hamlet in the west part of the town on County Road 6.
- Twelve Mile Creek – A stream flowing into the Cohocton River at Wallace.
- Wallace – A hamlet northwest of Avoca village on NY Route 415.
