= Larrowe House =

Historic house in New York, United States

- U.S. National Register of Historic Places
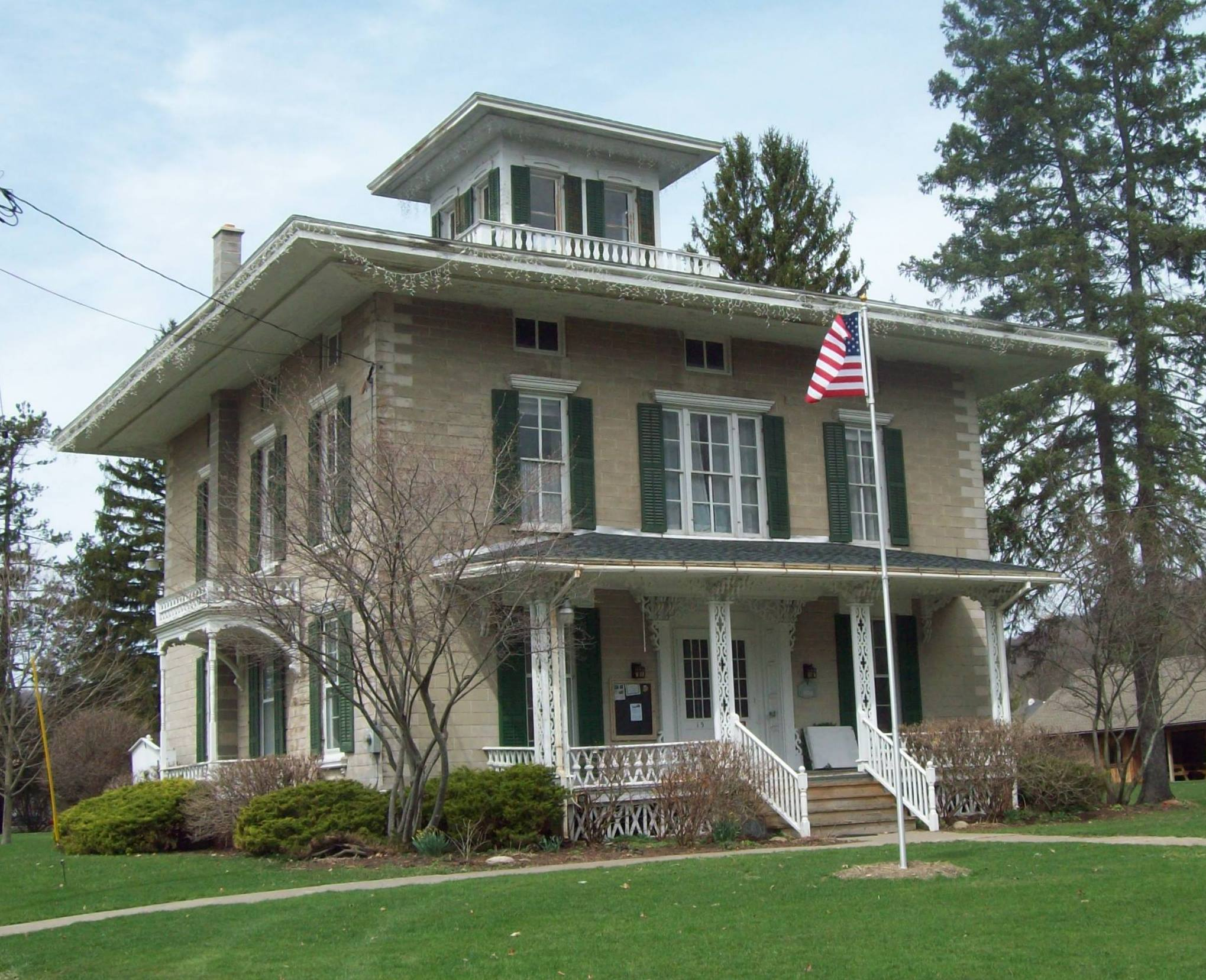
- Larrowe House, April 2011

- Location within New York Location within the United States
- Location: S. Main St./NY 415, Cohocton, New York
- Coordinates: 42°29′55″N 77°29′42″W
- Area: 1.6 acres (0.65 ha)
- Built: 1856
- Architectural style: Italianate
- NRHP reference No.: 89002088
- Added to NRHP: December 07, 1989

Larrowe House, also known as The Cohocton Town and Village Hall, is a historic home located at Cohocton in Steuben County, New York. It is a 38 by 40 foot, two story dwelling constructed in 1856 in the Italianate style. There is a square cupola in the center of the roof. The Larrowe family donated the house in 1950 for use as a municipal hall. It remained in that use until the Cohocton Historical Society acquired the house in August 2009.

It was listed on the National Register of Historic Places in 1989.
