= Howard, New York =

- Town
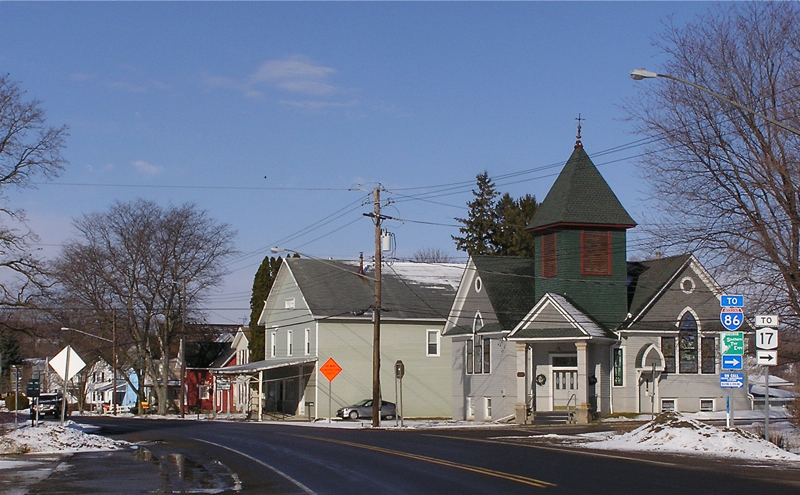
- Howard, New York

- Location within the state of New York
- Coordinates: 42°20′41″N 77°30′56″W
- Country: United States
- State: New York
- County: Steuben

Area
  - Total: 60.76 sq mi (157.38 km^{2})
  - Land: 60.54 sq mi (156.81 km^{2})
  - Water: 0.22 sq mi (0.57 km^{2})
- Elevation: 1,588 ft (484 m)

Population (2020)
  - Total: 1,380 ▼
  - Estimate (2021): 1,367
  - Density: 23.4/sq mi (9.04/km^{2})
- Time zone: UTC-5 (Eastern (EST))
  - Summer (DST): UTC-4 (EDT)
- FIPS code: 36-35837
- GNIS feature ID: 0979082
- Website: https://www.howardny.com/

Howard is a town in Steuben County, New York, United States. The population was 1,380 at the 2020 census.

The Town of Howard is in the west-central part of the county, east of Hornell.

== History ==
The town was first settled circa 1803, but not permanently settled until after that date. The town was formed in 1812 from parts of the Towns of Bath and Dansville. In turn, Howard contributed some of its territory to form part of the Towns of Avoca (1843) and Fremont (1854).

== Geography ==
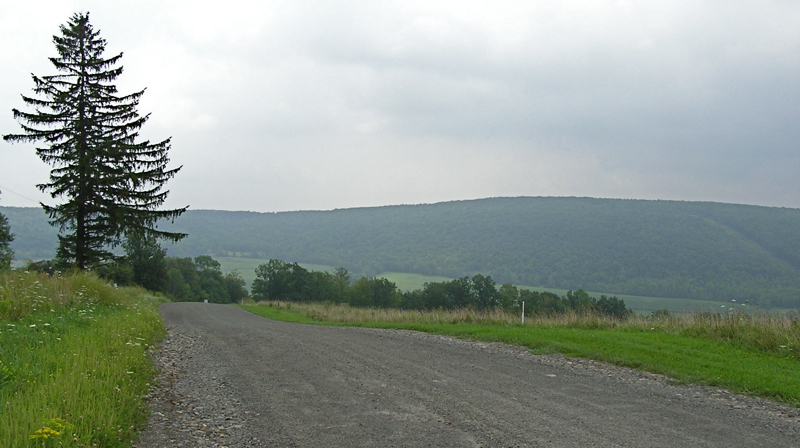
The Finger Lakes Trail in Howard, New York.

According to the United States Census Bureau, the town has a total area of 60.7 square miles (157 km^{2}), of which 60.6 square miles (157 km^{2}) is land and 0.1 square miles (0.26 km^{2}) of it (0.16%) is water.

Interstate 86 passes across the northern half of the town. Exit 35 is located in the town of Howard itself.

== Demographics ==
Historical population
| Census | Pop. | Note | %± |
|---|---|---|---|
| 1820 | 1,140 | | — |
| 1830 | 2,463 | | 116.1% |
| 1840 | 3,247 | | 31.8% |
| 1850 | 3,244 | | −0.1% |
| 1860 | 2,746 | | −15.4% |
| 1870 | 2,122 | | −22.7% |
| 1880 | 2,131 | | 0.4% |
| 1890 | 1,938 | | −9.1% |
| 1900 | 1,704 | | −12.1% |
| 1910 | 1,461 | | −14.3% |
| 1920 | 1,127 | | −22.9% |
| 1930 | 1,032 | | −8.4% |
| 1940 | 893 | | −13.5% |
| 1950 | 902 | | 1.0% |
| 1960 | 929 | | 3.0% |
| 1970 | 1,029 | | 10.8% |
| 1980 | 1,236 | | 20.1% |
| 1990 | 1,331 | | 7.7% |
| 2000 | 1,430 | | 7.4% |
| 2010 | 1,467 | | 2.6% |
| 2020 | 1,380 | | −5.9% |
| 2021 (est.) | 1,367 | | −0.9% |
U.S. Decennial Census

As of the census of 2010, there were 1,467 people, The population density was 23.6 inhabitants per square mile (9.1/km^{2}). There were 788 housing units at an average density of 11.6 per square mile (4.5/km^{2}). The racial makeup of the town was 97.7% White, 0.4% African American, 0.2% Native American, 0.07% Pacific Islander, 0.49% from other races, and 0.42% from two or more races. Hispanic or Latino of any race were 0.70% of the population.

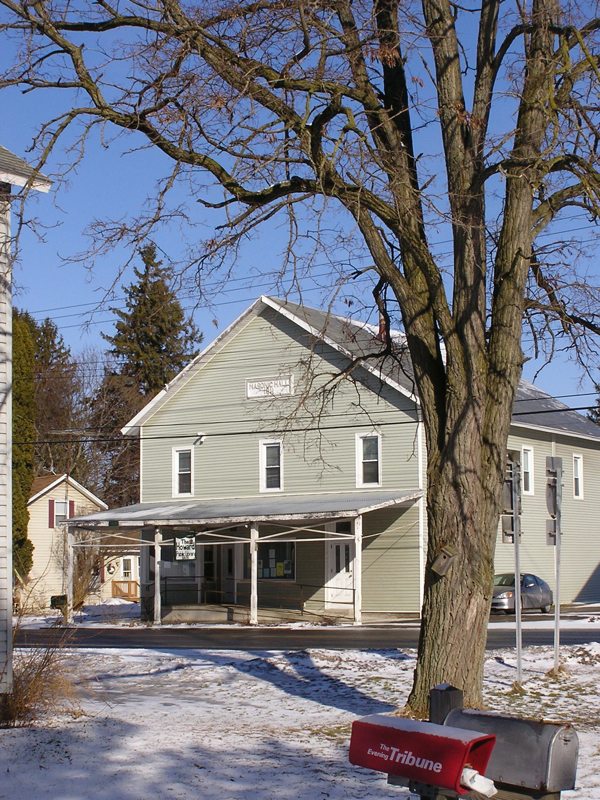
Howard Public Library

There were 505 households, out of which 41.0% had children under the age of 18 living with them, 61.8% were married couples living together, 7.1% had a female householder with no husband present, and 23.8% were non-families. 18.0% of all households were made up of individuals, and 7.3% had someone living alone who was 65 years of age or older. The average household size was 2.81 and the average family size was 3.13.

In the town, the population was spread out, with 30.5% under the age of 18, 6.9% from 18 to 24, 27.0% from 25 to 44, 25.0% from 45 to 64, and 10.7% who were 65 years of age or older. The median age was 36 years. For every 100 females, there were 100.6 males. For every 100 females age 18 and over, there were 102.4 males.

The median income for a household in the town was $39,141, and the median income for a family was $42,353. Males had a median income of $30,326 versus $23,264 for females. The per capita income for the town was $15,116. About 4.2% of families and 8.4% of the population were below the poverty line, including 9.3% of those under age 18 and 2.8% of those age 65 or over.

== Education ==
In its current configuration, Howard is split among four neighboring school districts including Avoca, Bath, Canisteo-Greenwood, and Hornell.

In the past there were multiple noteworthy schools in the town of Howard. One of those schools, which was located on NY 70A northwest of Willis Memorial Park, was built out of cobblestone and was thought to be one of the northernmost cobblestone buildings in the state of New York. That building, long abandoned, partially collapsed in 2004 and was razed by the then-current owners.

Another former schoolhouse in the town still remains open, now being used as a heating equipment store (B&D Partners, also formerly Southern Tier Farm Supply). This building is located on the south side of the Interstate-86 entrance/exit ramps and is easily distinguishable from houses in the area.

== Communities and locations in the Town of Howard ==
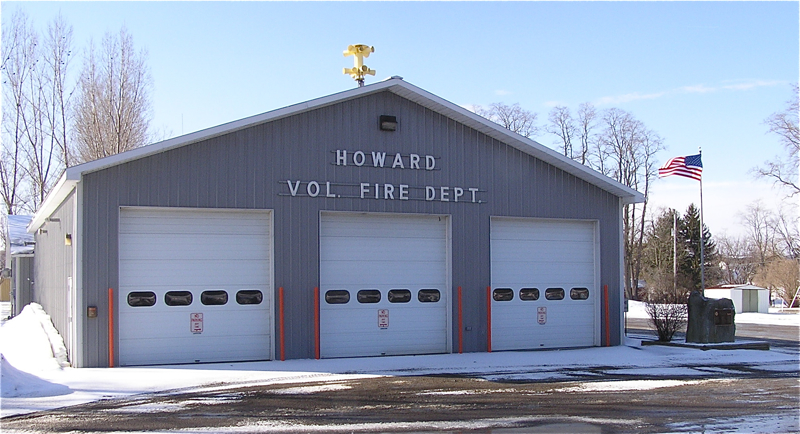
Howard Volunteer Fire Department.

- Buena Vista – A hamlet near the south town line on County Road 69.
- Butchers Corners – A hamlet on the west town line on County Road 56.
- Goff's Mills – A former community in the northeast part of the town.
- Howard – The hamlet of Howard is located by Interstate 86 along County Road 70a.
- Lake Demon – (Also known as Demons Pond) A small lake between Howard village and Towlesville. Pronunciation rhymes with "lemon".
- Stephens Creek – A stream flowing out of the southwest part of the town.
- Towlesville – A hamlet in the southeast part of the town on County Road 69.
