= Cohocton (village), New York =

Cohocton
- Village
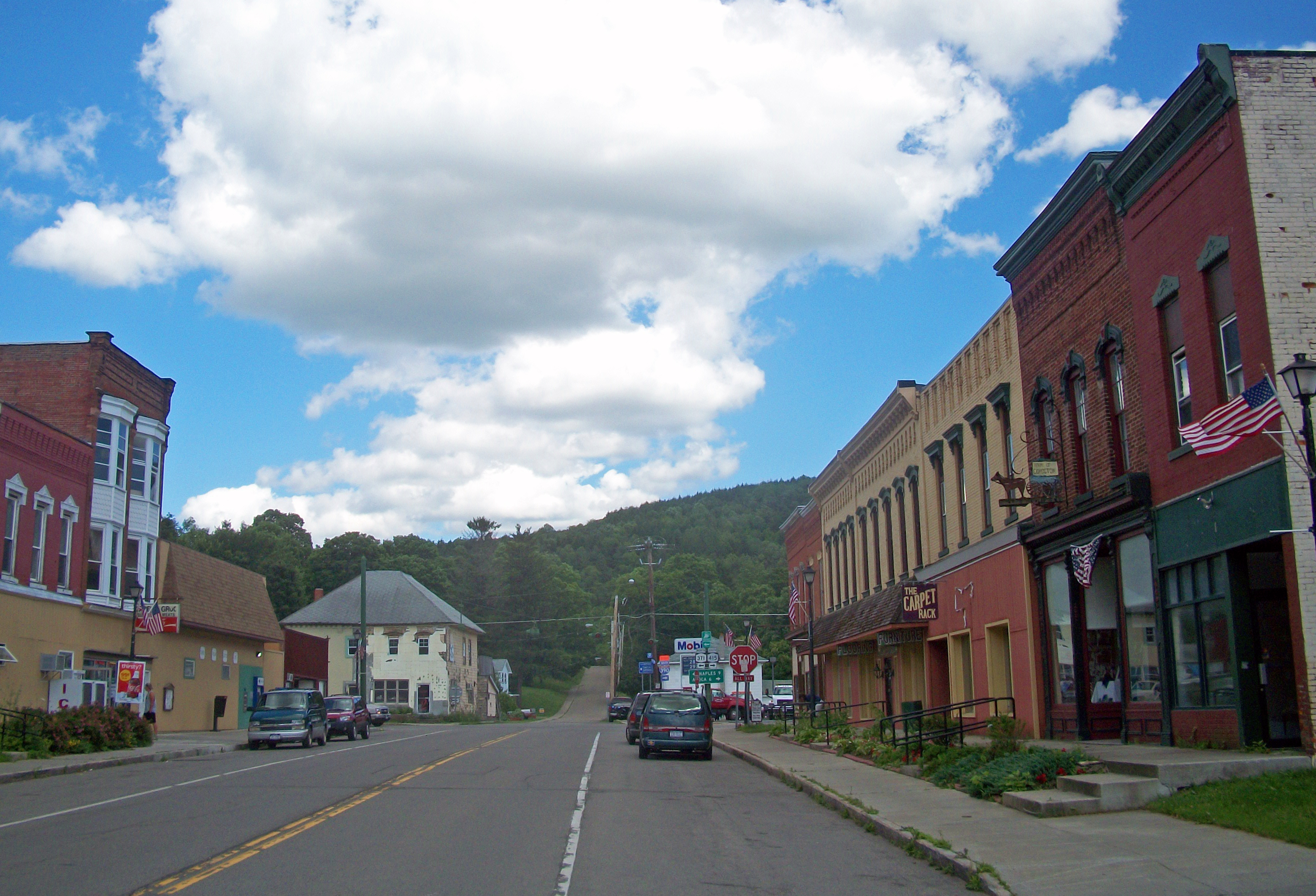
- Downtown Cohocton

- Location within the state of New York
- Coordinates: 42°30′1″N 77°29′37″W
- Country: United States
- State: New York
- County: Steuben

Government
  - Type: Town and Village Hall
  - Mayor: Janice Sahrle

Area
  - Total: 1.50 sq mi (3.89 km^{2})
  - Land: 1.50 sq mi (3.89 km^{2})
  - Water: 0 sq mi (0.00 km^{2})
- Elevation: 1,340 ft (410 m)
- Highest elevation (N boundary): 1,760 ft (540 m)
- Lowest elevation (Cohocton River at S boundary): 1,260 ft (380 m)

Population (2020)
  - Total: 703
  - Density: 468.2/sq mi (180.78/km^{2})
- Time zone: UTC-5 (EST)
  - Summer (DST): UTC-4 (EDT)
- ZIP Code: 14826
- Area code: 585
- FIPS code: 36-16727
- GNIS feature ID: 0947007
- Wikimedia Commons: Cohocton, New York
- Website: https://www.villageofcohocton.com/

Cohocton is a village in Steuben County, New York, United States. The population was 838 at the 2010 census. The name is derived from an Iroquois phrase for "log in the water."

The Village of Cohocton is in the southeast part of the Town of Cohocton, and is northwest of Bath, New York.

== History ==
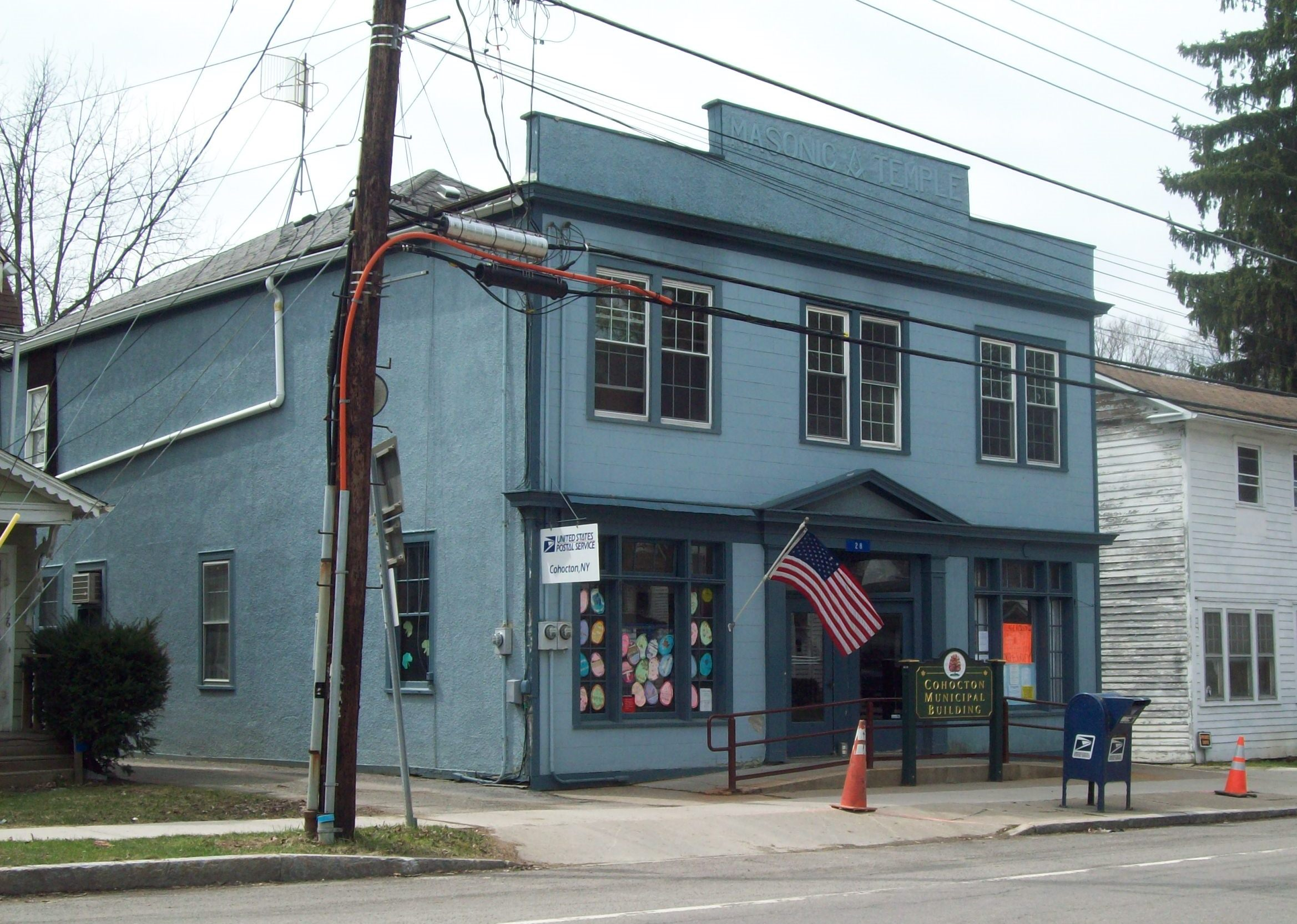
Cohocton Post Office and Municipal Building, April 2011

The village was once known as "Liberty," but changed its name to Cohocton when it was incorporated as a village in 1891. The Larrowe House, formerly occupied as The Cohocton Town and Village Hall, was listed on the National Register of Historic Places in 1989. The Cohocton Historical Society acquired the house in August 2009.

== Geography ==
Cohocton is located at 42°29′55″N 77°29′57″W (42.498705, -77.499208).

According to the United States Census Bureau, the village has a total area of 1.5 square miles (3.9 km^{2}), all land.

The village is next to Interstate 390. New York State Route 371, New York State Route 415, and County Road 121 lead into the village.

Cohocton is on the Gang Mills (Painted Post) to Wayland Line of the B&H Rail Corp. The B&H also has a spur which serves an industrial district on the east side of the Conhocton River. The B&H's office and shops are located adjacent to the Gang Mills-Wayland line.

The Conhocton River flows southward through the village.

== Demographics ==
Historical population
Census	Pop.	Note	%±
1900	879		—
1910	838		−4.7%
1920	843		0.6%
1930	860		2.0%
1940	931		8.3%
1950	943		1.3%
1960	929		−1.5%
1970	897		−3.4%
1980	902		0.6%
1990	859		−4.8%
2000	854		−0.6%
2010	838		−1.9%
2020	703		−16.1%
U.S. Decennial Census

As of the census of 2000, there were 854 people, 316 households, and 224 families residing in the village. The population density was 568.2 inhabitants per square mile (219.4/km^{2}). There were 349 housing units at an average density of 232.2 per square mile (89.7/km^{2}). The racial makeup of the village was 98.48% White, 1.17% Native American, and 0.35% from two or more races. Hispanic or Latino of any race were 0.12% of the population.

There were 316 households, out of which 38.6% had children under the age of 18 living with them, 49.1% were married couples living together, 13.6% had a female householder with no husband present, and 29.1% were non-families. 24.1% of all households were made up of individuals, and 11.7% had someone living alone who was 65 years of age or older. The average household size was 2.68 and the average family size was 3.08.

In the village, the population was spread out, with 30.7% under the age of 18, 7.5% from 18 to 24, 27.8% from 25 to 44, 20.7% from 45 to 64, and 13.3% who were 65 years of age or older. The median age was 35 years. For every 100 females, there were 99.1 males. For every 100 females age 18 and over, there were 92.2 males.

The median income for a household in the village was $35,147, and the median income for a family was $38,438. Males had a median income of $30,057 versus $22,321 for females. The per capita income for the village was $13,660. About 13.5% of families and 15.3% of the population were below the poverty line, including 18.8% of those under age 18 and 9.6% of those age 65 or over.
