= Interstate 390 =

Highway in New York

Interstate 390
- Map of Western New York with I-390 highlighted in red

Route information
- Auxiliary route of I-90
- Maintained by NYSDOT
- Length: 76.06 mi (122.41 km)
- Existed: c. 1973–present
- NHS: Entire route

Major junctions
- South end: I-86 / NY 17 in Avoca
- US 20A in Geneseo; US 20 / NY 5 in Avon; I-90 Toll / New York Thruway / NY 253 in Henrietta; I-590 near Rochester
- North end: I-490 / NY 390 in Gates

Location
- Country: United States
- State: New York
- Counties: Steuben, Livingston, Monroe

Highway system
- Interstate Highway System; Main; Auxiliary; Suffixed; Business; Future; New York Highways; Interstate; US; State; Reference; Parkways
← NY 387	→ NY 390

Interstate 390 (I-390) is a 76.06-mile (122.41 km) north–south auxiliary Interstate Highway located in the U.S. state of New York. The southern terminus of the route is at the Southern Tier Expressway (I-86 and New York State Route 17, or NY 17) in the town of Avoca. Its northern terminus is at I-490 (Western Expressway) in Gates, just west of Rochester. North of I-490, the expressway continues as NY 390 to the Lake Ontario State Parkway in Greece. I-390 connects to its parent, I-90 (New York State Thruway), in Henrietta, a southern suburb of Rochester. The route is known as the Genesee Expressway from Avoca to I-590 in Brighton, where it becomes part of the Rochester Outer Loop.

In addition to serving Rochester, I-390 serves as an important connecting route between the Rochester metropolitan area and Corning and the rest of the Southern Tier of New York. The freeway also serves several smaller communities between Corning and Rochester, including the Livingston County villages of Dansville and Geneseo. I-390 effectively replaced US Route 15 (US 15) and parallels NY 15, US 15's de facto successor, north of Corning. From Lakeville north to Brighton, the two routes cross paths four times and are located no more than 1.5 miles (2.4 km) apart along the entire stretch.

The first section of the Genesee Expressway opened in the late 1960s, extending from Wayland in the east to Dansville in the west. The entirety of the then-proposed highway was designated as New York State Route 401 (NY 401) in 1970 but redesignated as I-390 c. 1973. More sections of the freeway opened throughout the 1970s, and I-390 was extended northwestward to cover the southwestern quadrant of the Rochester Outer Loop in 1980 following the elimination of NY 47. I-390 was completed in the early 1980s.

== Route description ==
In its southern sections, which account for most of the highway's mileage, I-390 is a lightly trafficked freeway of two lanes in either direction going through minimally populated rural areas. Closer to Rochester, it becomes wider to accommodate the increased traffic it handles in the city itself.

=== Steuben and Livingston counties ===
I-390 begins as westbound traffic on the concurrent routes of I-86 and NY 17 proceeds below the overpass carrying those two routes to the west, at an interchange just east of the village of Avoca in Steuben County. The expressway heads northwest through the narrow valley of the Cohocton River to Cohocton, where the river leaves the expressway and heads north toward the hamlet of Atlanta. I-390 climbs gradually as it continues past Cohocton, eventually turning due west as it descends to an interchange with NY 21 south of Wayland. This exit is also the southern terminus of NY 15, which eventually parallels the Interstate further north.

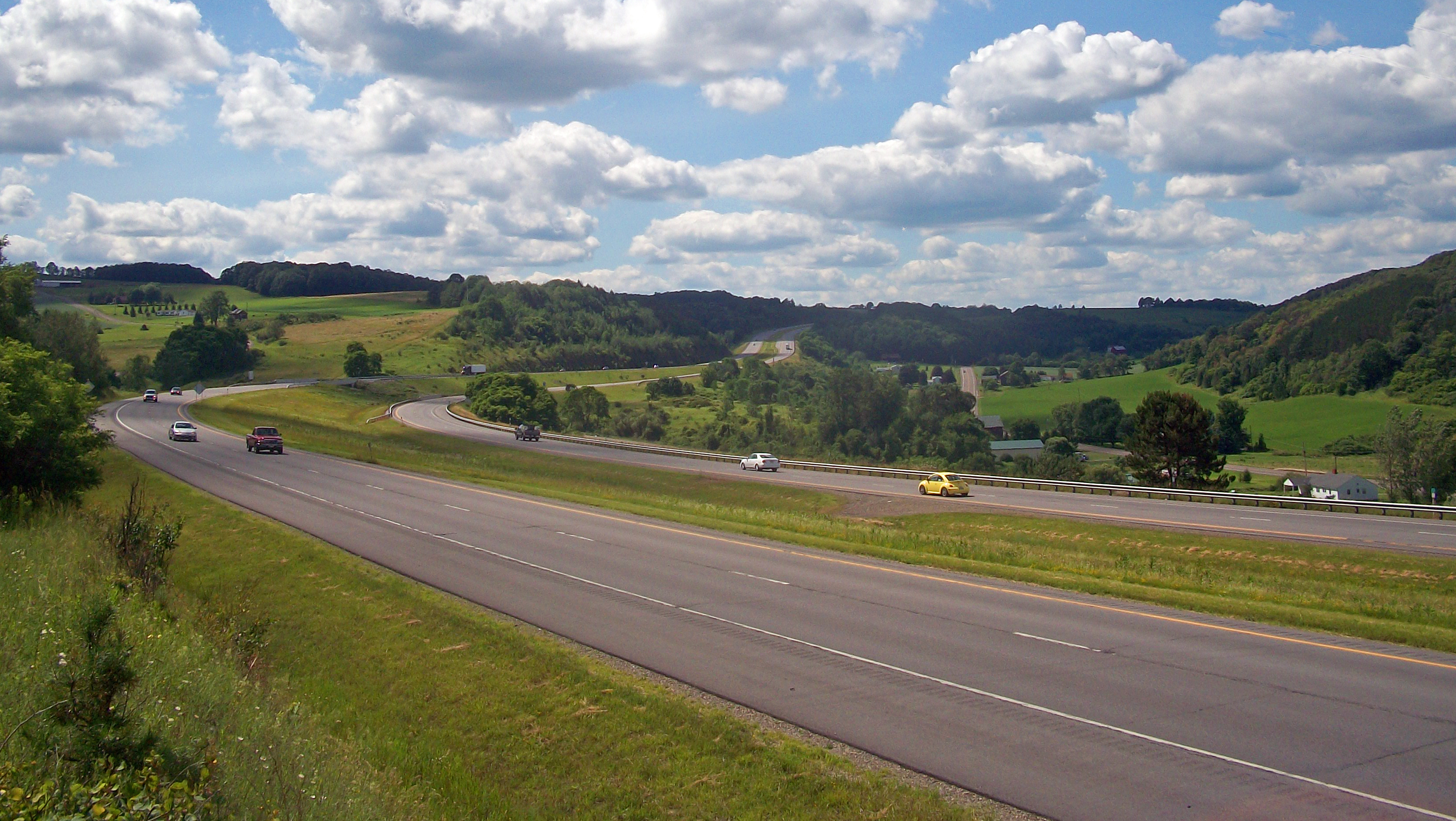
I-390 near Cohocton

The road climbs again as it makes a gentle bend and widens as it crosses the Livingston County line just south of Dansville and north of Stony Brook State Park. Descending again, it returns to its northwestern heading. North of the village, it climbs to the west side of the wide valley of Canaseraga Creek, giving the roadway a view over the area known locally as the Flats. NY 36 begins to parallel the highway closely, with NY 63 on the far side of the Flats. Just south of the hamlet of Sonyea, NY 36 crosses at a diamond interchange. I-390 turns northeast briefly but resumes its northwest course soon afterward. At this point, the highway follows more level ground, with woods and swamps mostly replacing farmland in the surrounding landscape.

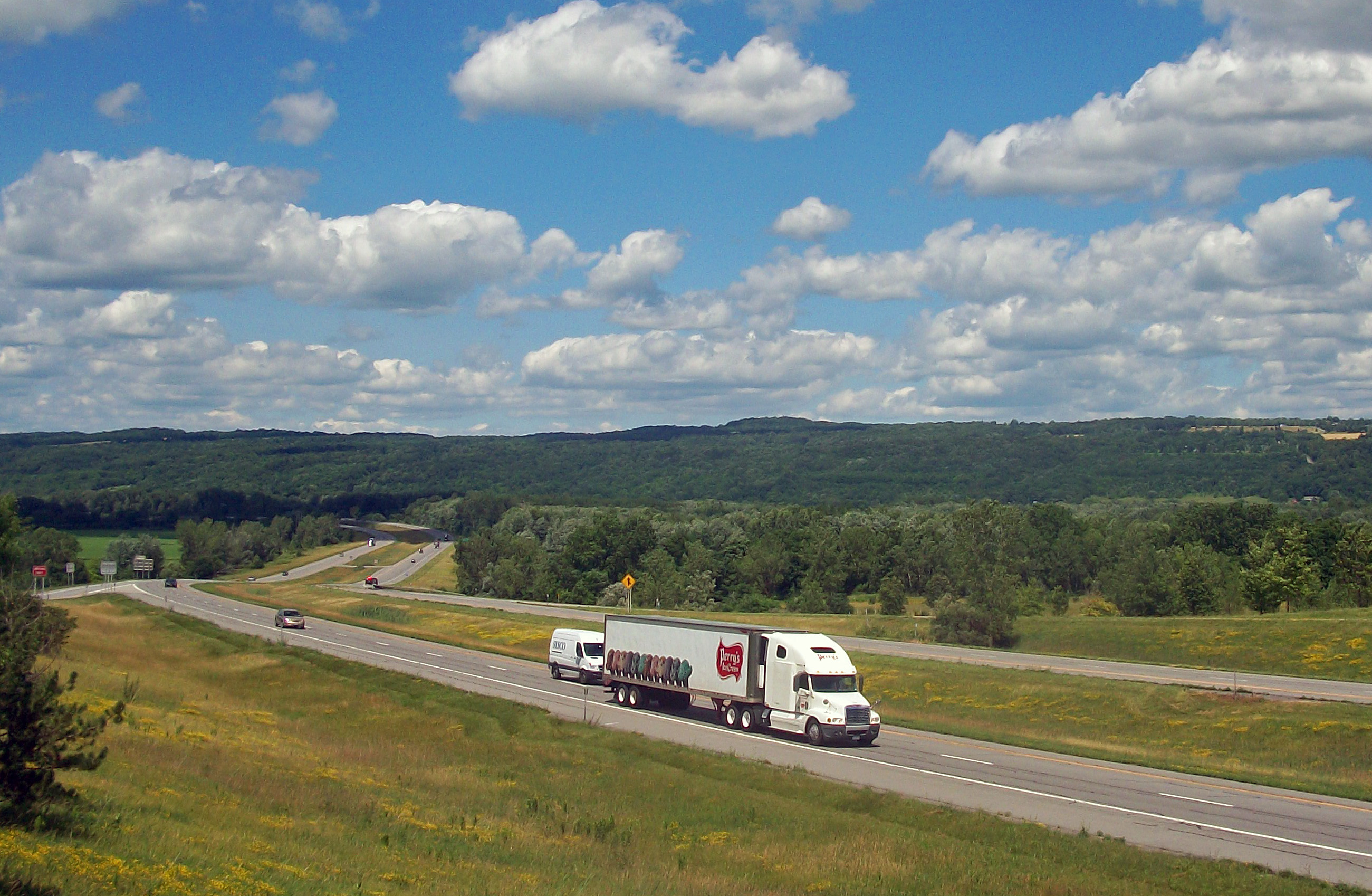
I-390 northbound from exit 6 near Sonyea

After passing rest areas on either side, I-390 reaches the NY 408 exit adjacent to the American Rock Salt mine at Hampton Corners. Here, most traffic bound for the Buffalo area exits to go west to Mount Morris, visible across the Flats from the freeway, where it follows NY 36 north. To the immediate east of the exit, NY 408 ends at NY 63, which carries traffic from the Interstate into Geneseo, the county seat. A mile (1.6 km) north of the exit, Canaseraga Creek drains into the Genesee River on the road's west side.

The expressway continues north through Livingston County to Geneseo, which I-390 skirts to the south and east. While there is no exit for Geneseo on the part of the freeway that encroaches the village, exit 8, an interchange with US 20 Alternate (US 20A) east of Geneseo, provides the connection. Also accessible from the junction is the hamlet of Lakeville, situated off to the east at the junction of US 20A and NY 15. I-390 continues on, encountering NY 15 north of Lakeville and southeast of Avon. From here north to Rochester, I-390 and NY 15 follow closely parallel alignments. Both highways meet US 20 and NY 5 east of Avon prior to crossing into Monroe County.

=== Monroe County ===
As I-390 heads north through the southern extents of the county, the surroundings become more residential and commercial in nature. The freeway meets NY 15 and NY 251 in Rush ahead of an interchange with both the New York State Thruway (I-90) and NY 253 in southern Henrietta. Past the thruway, the transition from the rural landscapes of the Southern Tier and Finger Lakes to residential and commercial areas is completed as I-390 continues into the suburbs of Rochester and the commercial center of Henrietta. Roughly 1.5 miles (2.4 km) from NY 253, I-390 has an exit leading to Hylan Drive, a through street leading to The Marketplace Mall. Farther north, I-390 meets both NY 15A and NY 252 in equally commercialized areas before entering Brighton.

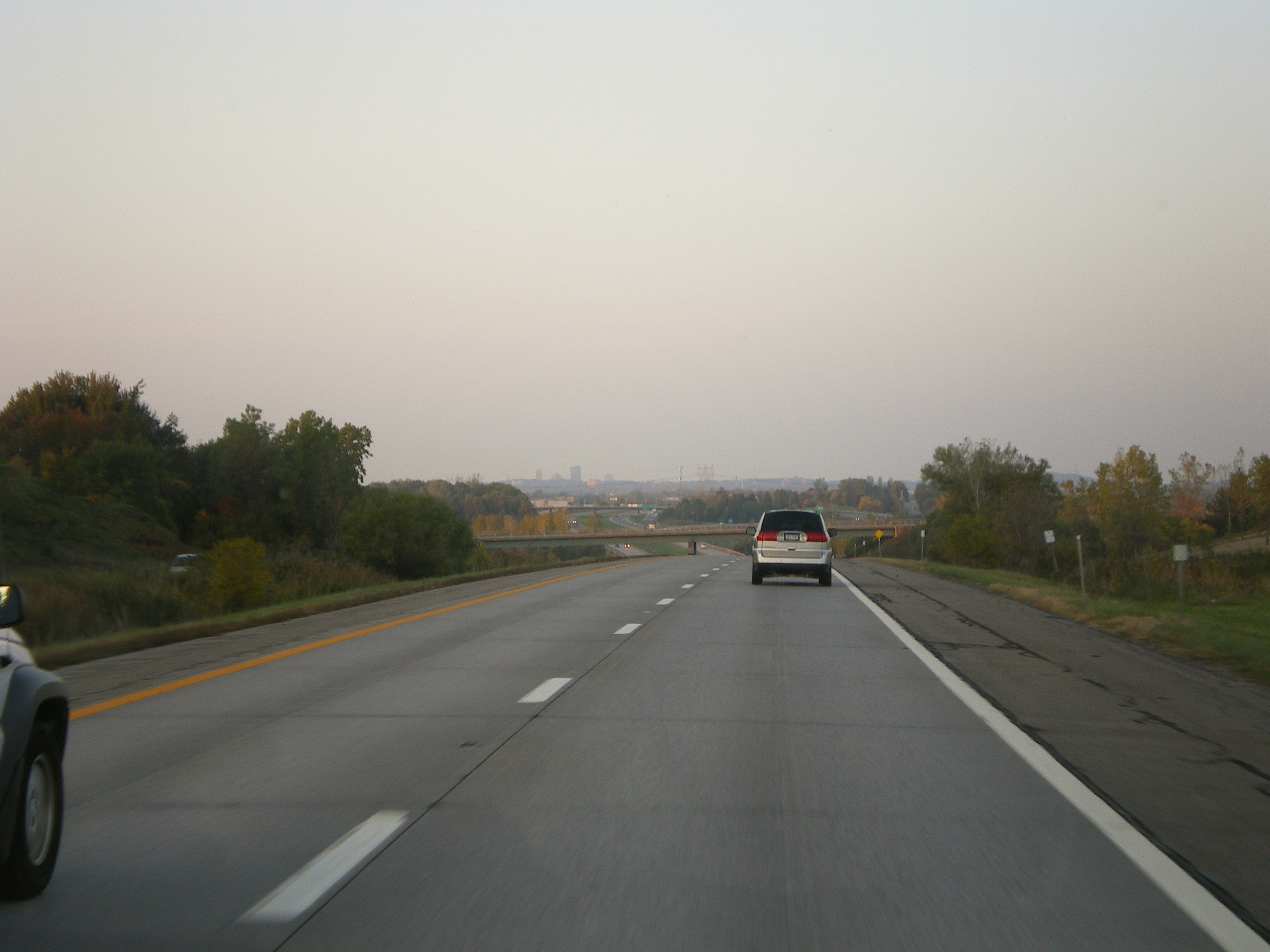
Northbound on I-390 in southern Henrietta. The skyline of Downtown Rochester is visible in the background.

Shortly after entering Brighton, I-390 crosses over the Erie Canal and meets the southern terminus of I-590 at a large semi-directional T interchange located adjacent to the canal and South Clinton Avenue. The latter of the two passes through the eastern half of the junction, crossing over I-590 but passing under the ramps connecting I-590 south to I-390 south and I-390 north to I-590 north. Past the exit, I-390 turns to the west, joining the Rochester Outer Loop and crossing back over the canal ahead of an interchange with NY 15 and NY 15A. After passing under NY 15, the freeway begins to run along the southern edge of the Erie Canal, here delimiting the southern city limits of Rochester. The canal and I-390 run side by side for just over one mile (1.6 km) to the Genesee River, where I-390 veers slightly to the west as it meets NY 383 at a partial cloverleaf interchange.

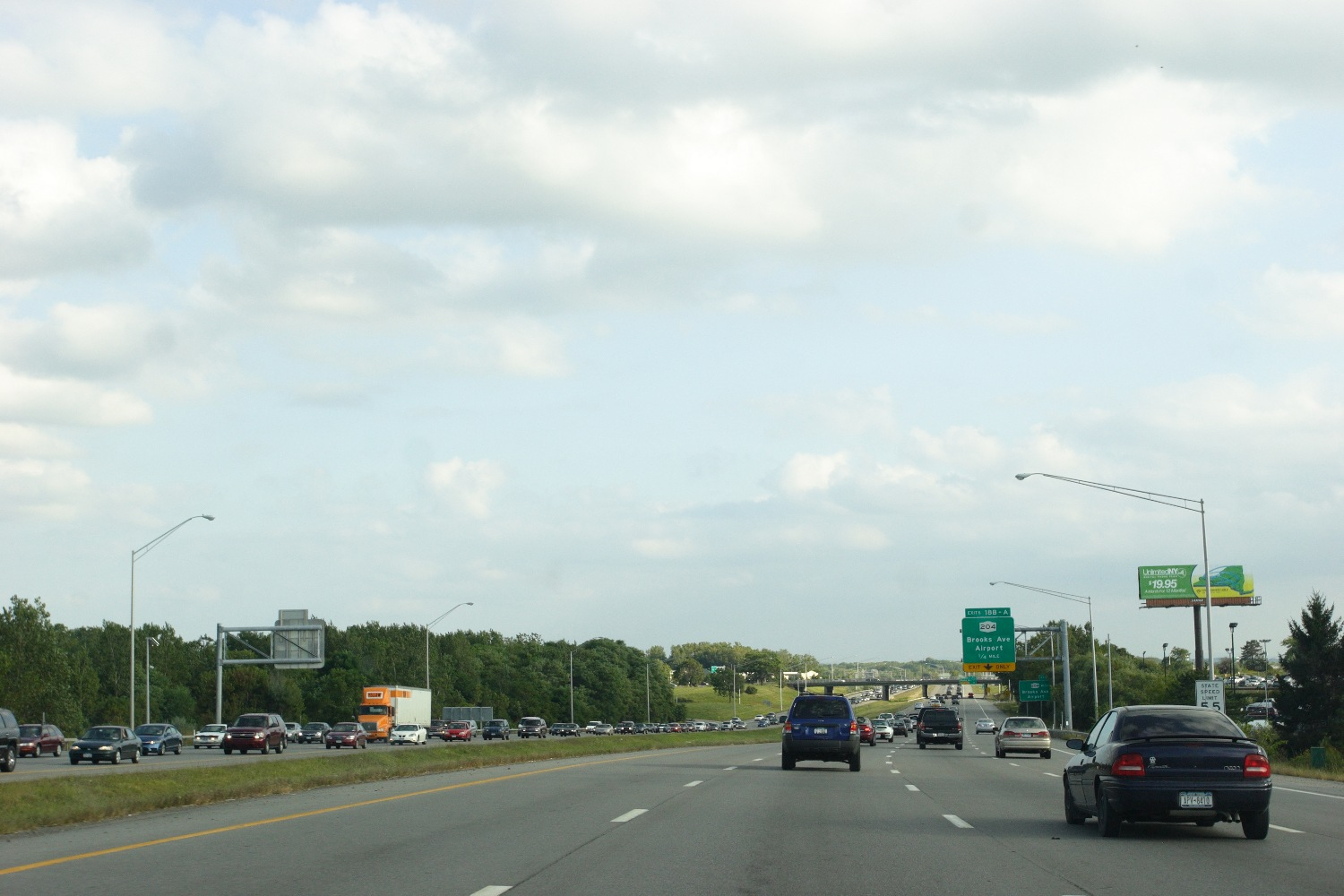
I-390 southbound by the Greater Rochester International Airport, with heavy traffic on the northbound side

For the next mile (1.6 km), I-390 follows a more northwesterly alignment along the northeastern edge of the Greater Rochester International Airport grounds. It meets Brooks Avenue (NY 204) at the northern edge of the grounds before leaving the airport area and curving more to the north, matching changes in the Erie Canal's alignment as both entities proceed around the southwestern edge of the city. Now in Gates, I-390 crosses over the Rochester and Southern Railroad just south of another partial cloverleaf interchange with NY 33A. The freeway continues on, passing under the CSX Transportation-owned Rochester Subdivision and NY 33 before connecting to I-490 at a complex interchange roughly 0.25 miles (0.40 km) west of the canal and the Rochester city limits. I-390 ends here; however, the freeway continues northward toward Greece as NY 390.

== History ==
Construction on a limited-access highway between Wayland and Dansville began c. 1966. The highway opened to traffic c. 1968 as a realignment of NY 245. On January 1, 1970, the expressway became part of NY 401, a designation that also extended south to the town of Avoca and north to the city of Rochester along the Genesee Expressway, a proposed freeway utilizing the US 15 corridor. NY 401 was added to the Interstate Highway System and redesignated I-390 c. 1973. As initially planned, I-390 would continue north into Downtown Rochester and end at I-490 while the entirety of the Rochester Outer Loop south of I-490 would become I-590.

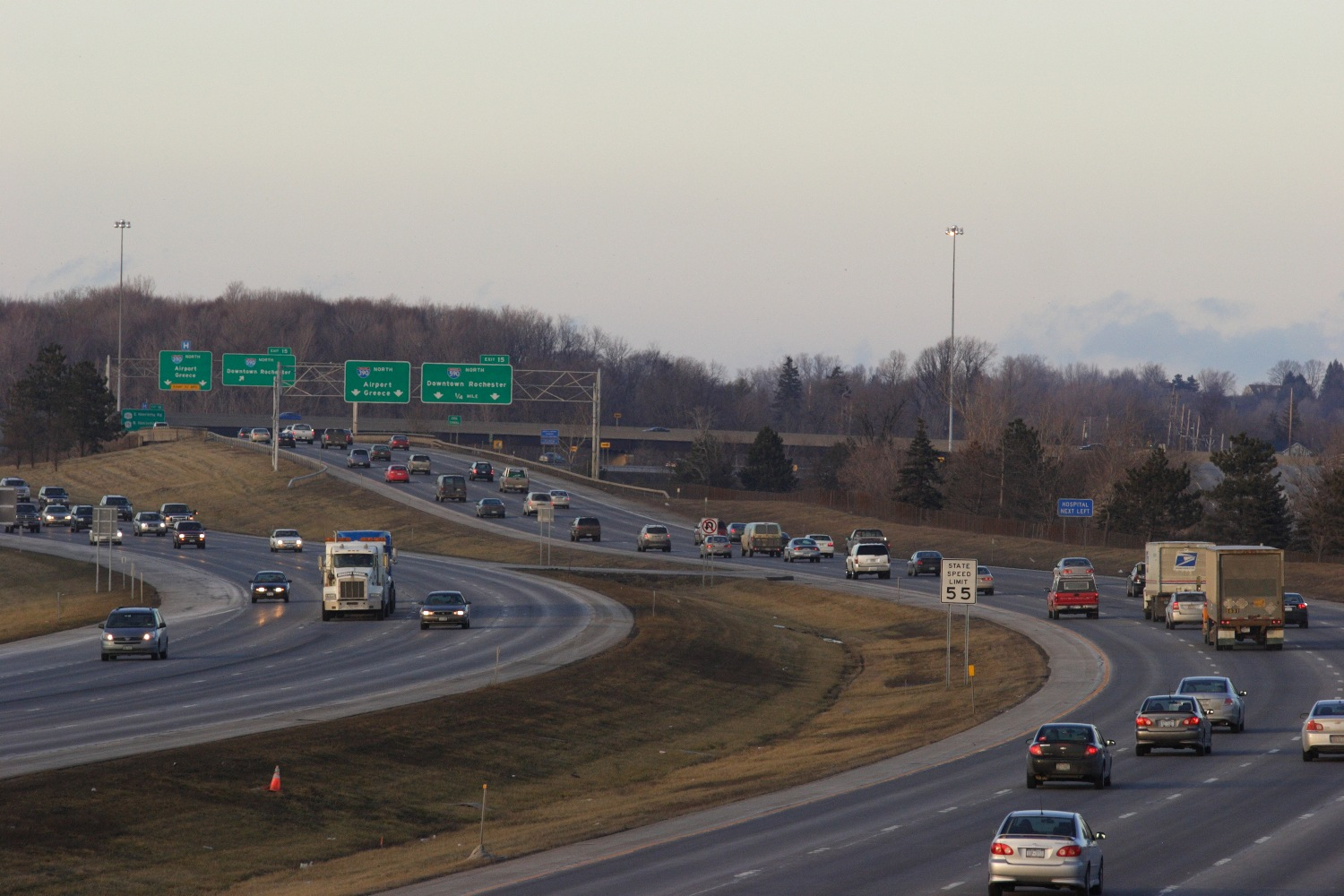
I-390 northbound near its interchange with I-590

Construction began c. 1974 on the portion of I-390 between NY 17 near the village of Avoca and NY 21 south of Wayland. It opened to traffic c. 1976. By 1977, work had begun on the leg between NY 251 in Rush and the New York State Thruway (I-90) in Henrietta. This section was completed by 1981, as were the Dansville–Groveland (NY 36), Avon–Rush, and thruway–Hylan Drive segments. The remainder of I-390 in Monroe County up to the modern I-390/I-590 interchange was built c. 1981, and the final gap in the expressway from NY 36 to US 20 in Livingston County opened c. 1982.

By the late 1970s, in the face of community opposition, the proposed extension of I-390 into Downtown Rochester was scrapped. Instead, the state of New York began to look into the possibility of changing the designations that were assigned to the outer loop. In one proposal submitted to the American Association of State Highway and Transportation Officials in the late 1970s, I-590 would be truncated to begin at the then-proposed junction with I-390 in Brighton. The rest of the loop south of I-490, meanwhile, would become part of an extended I-390, which would continue north past I-490 to the outer loop's northwestern end at the Lake Ontario State Parkway. NY 47, the then-current designation for much of the outer loop, would be eliminated.

Most of the plans went into effect when the NY 47 designation was eliminated on March 18, 1980. The southern half of the outer loop was signed as planned; however, I-390 and I-590 were modified to end at their junctions with I-490. While NY 47 was officially assigned to the entirety of the outer loop prior to its removal, only the portion from NY 383 north to I-490 was actually once part of NY 47.

On February 10, 2008, whiteout conditions caused a 36-car pileup near the Scottsville Road exit, which led to a 17-year-old girl's death. Firefighters had to climb over cars and cut off roofs to get to people. More than 20 people were taken to the hospital.

On July 17, 2011, a tour bus heading northbound from Washington, D.C. to Niagara Falls crashed between the Avoca and Cohocton exits, killing two and injuring at least 35 others. Preliminary investigation listed a blown-out tire as a possible cause of the crash.

== Future ==
As the successor to US 15 in Western New York, it has been suggested that I-390 be added to the routes of either I-99 or I-83 as recently as 2002, with I-99's northern completed segment currently sharing the US 15 routing up to Corning, 24 miles (39 km) south of I-390's current southern terminus. No official moves have been forwarded to fulfill this.

== Exit list ==
County	Location	mi	km	Exit	Destinations	Notes
Steuben	Town of Avoca	0.00	0.00	–	I-86 / NY 17 – Binghamton, Jamestown	Southern terminus; exit 36 on I-86
Steuben	Town of Avoca	2.04	3.28	1	To NY 415 – Avoca	Access via NY 961J
Steuben	Town of Cohocton	11.12	17.90	2	To NY 415 – Cohocton, Naples	Access via NY 962D
Steuben	Town of Wayland	16.75	26.96	3	NY 15 north / NY 21 – Wayland	
Livingston	North Dansville	22.84	36.76	4	NY 36 – Dansville, Hornell	
Livingston	North Dansville	24.19	38.93	5	NY 36 – Dansville, Airport	
Livingston	Groveland	32.96	53.04	6	NY 36 – Mount Morris, Letchworth State Park, Sonyea	Signed for Mount Morris/Letchworth Park northbound, Sonya southbound
Livingston	Groveland	38.77	62.39	7	NY 63 / NY 408 – Geneseo, Mount Morris, Letchworth State Park	Signed for Geneseo northbound, Mount Morris/Letchworth Park southbound
Livingston	Town of Geneseo	48.05	77.33	8	US 20A – Lakeville, Conesus Lake, Geneseo	Signed for Lakeville/Conesus Lake northbound, Geneseo southbound
Livingston	Town of Avon	51.50	82.88	9	NY 15 – Avon, Lakeville, Conesus Lake	Signed for Avon northbound, Lakeville/Conesus Lake southbound
Livingston	Town of Avon	54.59	87.85	10	US 20 / NY 5 – Avon, Lima	
Monroe	Rush	61.94	99.68	11	NY 15 / NY 251 – Rush, Scottsville	
Monroe	Henrietta	65.86	105.99	12	I-90 Toll / New York Thruway / NY 253 (Lehigh Station Road) to NY 15 – Albany, Buffalo	Signed as exits 12B (I-90) and 12A (NY 253) southbound; exit 46 on I-90 / Thruway
Monroe	Henrietta	67.28	108.28	13	Hylan Drive – Mall	
Monroe	Henrietta	68.37	110.03	14	NY 15A (East Henrietta Road) / NY 252 (Jefferson Road)	Signed as exits 14B (NY 15A) and 14A (NY 252) southbound; serves Rochester Institute of Technology
Monroe	Henrietta–Brighton town line			15B	Brighton–Henrietta Townline Road	Southbound exit only; serves Monroe Community College
Monroe	Brighton	70.29	113.12	15A	I-590 north – Downtown Rochester, Irondequoit	Signed as exit 15 northbound; signed for Rochester northbound, Irondequoit southbound
Monroe	Brighton	71.69	115.37	16	NY 15 (West Henrietta Road) / NY 15A (East Henrietta Road)	Northbound exit and southbound entrance; signed as exits 16B (NY 15A north) and 16A (NY 15/NY 15A south)
Monroe	Brighton	71.69	115.37	16	NY 15 (West Henrietta Road) / NY 15A (East Henrietta Road)	Southbound exit and northbound entrance; signed as exits 16B (NY 15A) and 16A (NY 15)
Monroe	Brighton			–	Kendrick Road	Northbound entrance only; opened September 2014
Monroe	Chili	73.09	117.63	17	NY 383 (Scottsville Road)	Serves Rochester Institute of Technology and University of Rochester
Monroe	Rochester–Gates line	73.80	118.77	18	NY 204 (Brooks Avenue) – Airport	Signed as exits 18A (east) and 18B (west)
Monroe	Gates	74.51	119.91	19	NY 33A (Chili Avenue)	
Monroe	Gates	75.86	122.08	20	I-490 – Rochester, Buffalo	Signed as exits 20A (east) and 20B (west); exit 9B on I-490
Monroe	Gates	75.86	122.08	–	NY 390 north – Greece	Continuation north
1.000 mi = 1.609 km; 1.000 km = 0.621 mi: Incomplete access

== See also ==
- New York State Route 390 for exits 21–27
