= Avoca (village), New York =

Avoca, New York
- Village
- Location within the state of New York
- Coordinates: 42°24′38″N 77°25′13″W
- Country: United States
- State: New York
- County: Steuben

Area
  - Total: 1.33 sq mi (3.44 km^{2})
  - Land: 1.32 sq mi (3.43 km^{2})
  - Water: 0.0039 sq mi (0.01 km^{2})
- Elevation: 1,194 ft (364 m)

Population (2020)
  - Total: 809
  - Density: 610.1/sq mi (235.58/km^{2})
- Time zone: UTC-5 (Eastern (EST))
  - Summer (DST): UTC-4 (EDT)
- ZIP code: 14809
- Area code: 607
- FIPS code: 36-03331
- GNIS feature ID: 0942735

Avoca is a village located in the town of the same name in Steuben County, New York, United States. The population was 946 at the 2010 census. It is in the eastern part of the town, northwest of Bath.

== History ==
Avoca was the first settlement in the town, circa 1794. The village was previously known as "Eight Mile Tree", then "Buchanan" before it adopted the current name. Avoca was incorporated as a village in 1883.

== Geography ==
Avoca is located at 42°24′38″N 77°25′13″W (42.410614, -77.420359).

According to the United States Census Bureau, the village has a total area of 1.2 square miles (3.1 km^{2}), all land.

New York State Route 415 passes north-to-south through the village, and County Road 8 enters the northeast part of the village. Avoca is on west side of Interstate 390, north of the junction with the Southern Tier Expressway.

Avoca is located on the Gang Mills (Painted Post) to Wayland line of the B&H (Bath & Hammondsport) Rail Corp.

Avoca is on the Cohocton River.

== Demographics ==
Historical population
| Census | Pop. | Note | %± |
|---|---|---|---|
| 1840 | 200 | | — |
| 1850 | 300 | | 50.0% |
| 1860 | 301 | | 0.3% |
| 1870 | 492 | | 63.5% |
| 1880 | 547 | | 11.2% |
| 1890 | 953 | | 74.2% |
| 1900 | 1,006 | | 5.6% |
| 1910 | 1,057 | | 5.1% |
| 1920 | 1,019 | | −3.6% |
| 1930 | 940 | | −7.8% |
| 1940 | 1,006 | | 7.0% |
| 1950 | 951 | | −5.5% |
| 1960 | 1,086 | | 14.2% |
| 1970 | 1,153 | | 6.2% |
| 1980 | 1,144 | | −0.8% |
| 1990 | 1,033 | | −9.7% |
| 2000 | 1,008 | | −2.4% |
| 2010 | 946 | | −6.2% |
| 2020 | 809 | | −14.5% |
U.S. Decennial Census

As of the census of 2000, there were 1,008 people, 363 households, and 260 families residing in the village. The population density was 854.9 inhabitants per square mile (330.1/km^{2}). There were 393 housing units at an average density of 333.3 per square mile (128.7/km^{2}). The racial makeup of the village was 97.42% White, 0.50% Black or African American, 0.20% Native American, 0.40% Asian, 0.60% from other races, and 0.89% from two or more races. Hispanic or Latino of any race were 1.39% of the population.

There were 363 households, out of which 39.1% had children under the age of 18 living with them, 51.8% were married couples living together, 16.8% had a female householder with no husband present, and 28.1% were non-families. 22.9% of all households were made up of individuals, and 9.1% had someone living alone who was 65 years of age or older. The average household size was 2.70 and the average family size was 3.17.

In the village, the population was spread out, with 32.2% under the age of 18, 5.4% from 18 to 24, 25.8% from 25 to 44, 22.4% from 45 to 64, and 14.2% who were 65 years of age or older. The median age was 35 years. For every 100 females, there were 97.3 males. For every 100 females age 18 and over, there were 100.9 males.

The median income for a household in the village was $31,713, and the median income for a family was $32,443. Males had a median income of $28,864 versus $21,563 for females. The per capita income for the village was $13,639. About 10.6% of families and 15.4% of the population were below the poverty line, including 21.3% of those under age 18 and 3.7% of those age 65 or over.
