= National Register of Historic Places listings in Potter County, Pennsylvania =

Location of Potter County in Pennsylvania

This is a list of the National Register of Historic Places listings in Potter County, Pennsylvania.

This is intended to be a complete list of the properties and districts on the National Register of Historic Places in Potter County, Pennsylvania, United States. The locations of National Register properties and districts for which the latitude and longitude coordinates are included below, may be seen in a map.

There are 5 properties and districts listed on the National Register in the county.

This National Park Service list is complete through NPS recent listings posted December 12, 2025.

== Current listings ==
	Name on the Register	Image	Date listed	Location	City or town	Description
1	Austin Dam	Austin Dam	January 15, 1987 (#86003570)	Pennsylvania Route 872; 41°38′26″N 78°05′18″W	Austin	
2	Cherry Springs Picnic Pavilion	Cherry Springs Picnic Pavilion	May 11, 1987 (#87000052)	8 miles (13 km) north of Carter Camp off Pennsylvania Route 44; 41°39′41″N 77°49′23″W	West Branch Township	
3	Coudersport and Port Allegany Railroad Station	Coudersport and Port Allegany Railroad Station	November 21, 1976 (#76001673)	201 South West Street; 41°46′15″N 78°01′19″W	Coudersport	
4	Coudersport Historic District	Coudersport Historic District	May 9, 1985 (#85000997)	Roughly bounded by Seventh, East, Water, and Main Streets; 41°46′32″N 78°01′22″W	Coudersport	
5	Potter County Courthouse	Potter County Courthouse	February 24, 1975 (#75001664)	East 2nd Street; 41°46′28″N 78°01′14″W	Coudersport	

== See also ==
- List of Pennsylvania state historical markers in Potter County
