= Tuscarora, New York =

- Town
- Location within the state of New York
- Coordinates: 42°3′19.5834″N 77°15′48.6138″W
- Country: United States
- State: New York
- County: Steuben

Area
  - Total: 37.71 sq mi (97.68 km^{2})
  - Land: 37.63 sq mi (97.46 km^{2})
  - Water: 0.085 sq mi (.22 km^{2})
- Elevation: 1,155 ft (352 m)

Population (2020)
  - Total: 1,388 ▼
  - Estimate (2021): 1,378
  - Density: 38.3/sq mi (14.79/km^{2})
- Time zone: UTC-5 (Eastern (EST))
  - Summer (DST): UTC-4 (EDT)
- Postal codes: 14801 (Addison, NY)
- Area code: 607
- FIPS code: 36-75737
- GNIS feature ID: 0979563

Tuscarora is a town in Steuben County, New York, United States. The population was 1,388 at the 2020 census. The town is named after the Tuscarora tribe. The town is in the southern part of the county, southwest of the city of Corning.

== History ==
Tuscarora was formed in 1859 from part of the town of Addison.

== Geography ==
According to the United States Census Bureau, the town has a total area of 37.8 square miles (98 km^{2}), of which 37.8 square miles (98 km^{2}) is land and 0.04 square miles (0.10 km^{2}) (0.08%) is water.

The south town line is the border of Pennsylvania (Tioga County).

New York State Route 417 crosses the northern part of the town, following Tuscarora Creek.

The Tuscarora Creek crosses the northern part of the town. Elk Creek flows northward and joins Tuscarora Creek, west of South Addison.

== Demographics ==
Historical population
Census	Pop.	Note	%±
1860	1,566		—
1870	1,528		−2.4%
1880	1,544		1.0%
1890	1,438		−6.9%
1900	1,301		−9.5%
1910	1,006		−22.7%
1920	854		−15.1%
1930	839		−1.8%
1940	859		2.4%
1950	989		15.1%
1960	1,043		5.5%
1970	1,071		2.7%
1980	1,338		24.9%
1990	1,368		2.2%
2000	1,400		2.3%
2010	1,473		5.2%
2020	1,388		−5.8%
2021 (est.)	1,378	▼	−0.7%
U.S. Decennial Census

As of the census of 2010, there were 1,473 people, 558 households, and 412 families residing in the town. The population density was 37.1 inhabitants per square mile (14.3/km^{2}). There were 558 housing units at an average density of 15.0 per square mile (5.8/km^{2}). The racial makeup of the town was 98.64% White, 0.14% African American, 0.07% Native American, 0.14% Asian, and 1.00% from two or more races. Hispanic or Latino of any race were 0.50% of the population.

There were 558 households, out of which 37.7% had children under the age of 18 living with them, 52.2% were married couples living together, 13.6% had a female householder with no husband present, and 26.2% were non-families. 16.6% of all households were made up of individuals, and 23.5% had someone living alone who was 65 years of age or older. The average household size was 2.64 and the average family size was 2.93.

The median income for a household in the town was $31,708, and the median income for a family was $32,054. Males had a median income of $26,094 versus $26,250 for females. The per capita income for the town was $13,906. About 14.9% of families and 18.1% of the population were below the poverty line, including 23.0% of those under age 18 and 7.4% of those age 65 or over.

== Communities and locations in the Tuscarora ==
- Bear Falls – A waterfall south of South Addison.
- Freeman – A hamlet in the north part of the town on County Road 85.
- Nichols – A hamlet on County Road 86 near the south town line.
- Pinnacle State Park and Golf Course – A state park by the northeast town line.
- South Addison – A hamlet on NY-417 at the north town line.
- Van Fleet – A hamlet south of Freeman on County Road 85.
- Woods Corner – A hamlet south of Freeman on County Road 85 (Addison Hill Road).
