= Coudersport and Port Allegany Railroad =

Former railroad in Pennsylvania, United States

Overview
- Headquarters: Coudersport
- Locale: Potter and McKean counties, Pennsylvania
- Dates of operation: 1882–1964
- Successor: Wellsville, Addison and Galeton Railroad

Technical
- Track gauge: 4 ft 8 1/2 in (1,435 mm) standard gauge
- Previous gauge: originally 3 ft (914 mm) gauge

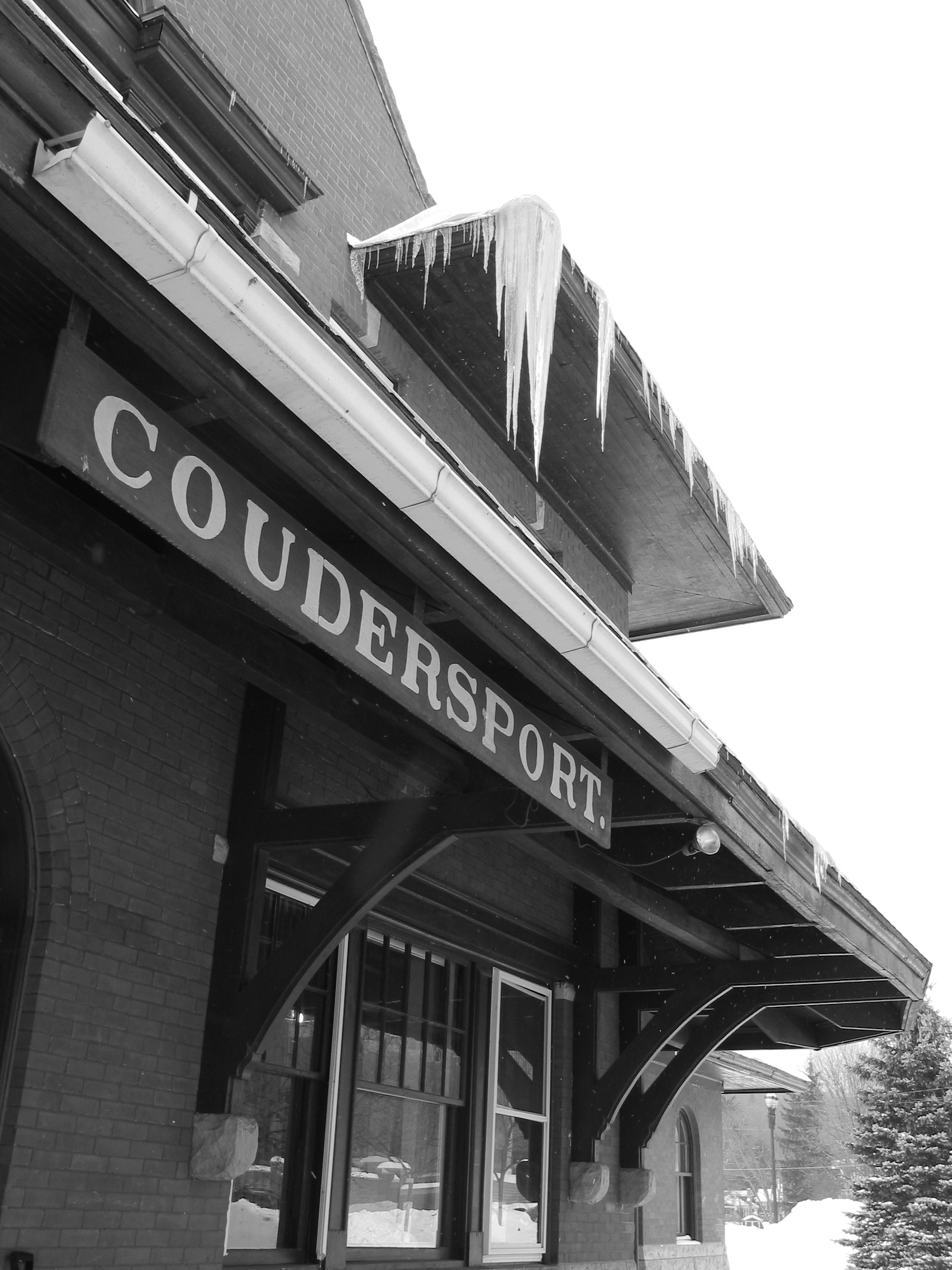
The Coudersport Depot, built in 1900. The last surviving structure of the C&PA Railroad, currently used as the borough office.

The Coudersport and Port Allegany Railroad was a shortline railroad that operated in Potter and McKean Counties in Pennsylvania in the United States between 1882 and 1964. The original line ran 17 miles (27 km) along the Allegheny River between the boroughs of Coudersport, the county seat of Potter County, and Port Allegany in McKean County. The line was originally a 3 ft (914 mm) narrow gauge and converted to 4 ft 8 1/2 in (1,435 mm) standard gauge in 1889. It was prosperous during a lumber boom in the region and expanded east to Ulysses. The lumber boom ended in the early 20th century and the line slowly declined until 1964, when it was purchased by the Wellsville, Addison and Galeton Railroad. The line was finally abandoned in 1970. Today the only surviving building from the railroad is the Coudersport and Port Allegany Railroad Station, which was listed on the National Register of Historic Places in 1976 and serves as the town hall for Coudersport today. As of 2009, much of the C&PA railroad grading can still be found. Railroad bridge abutments exist at Lillibridge Creek in Port Allegany and along the Allegheny River at Coleman Mills, east of Roulette, and east and west of Coudersport.

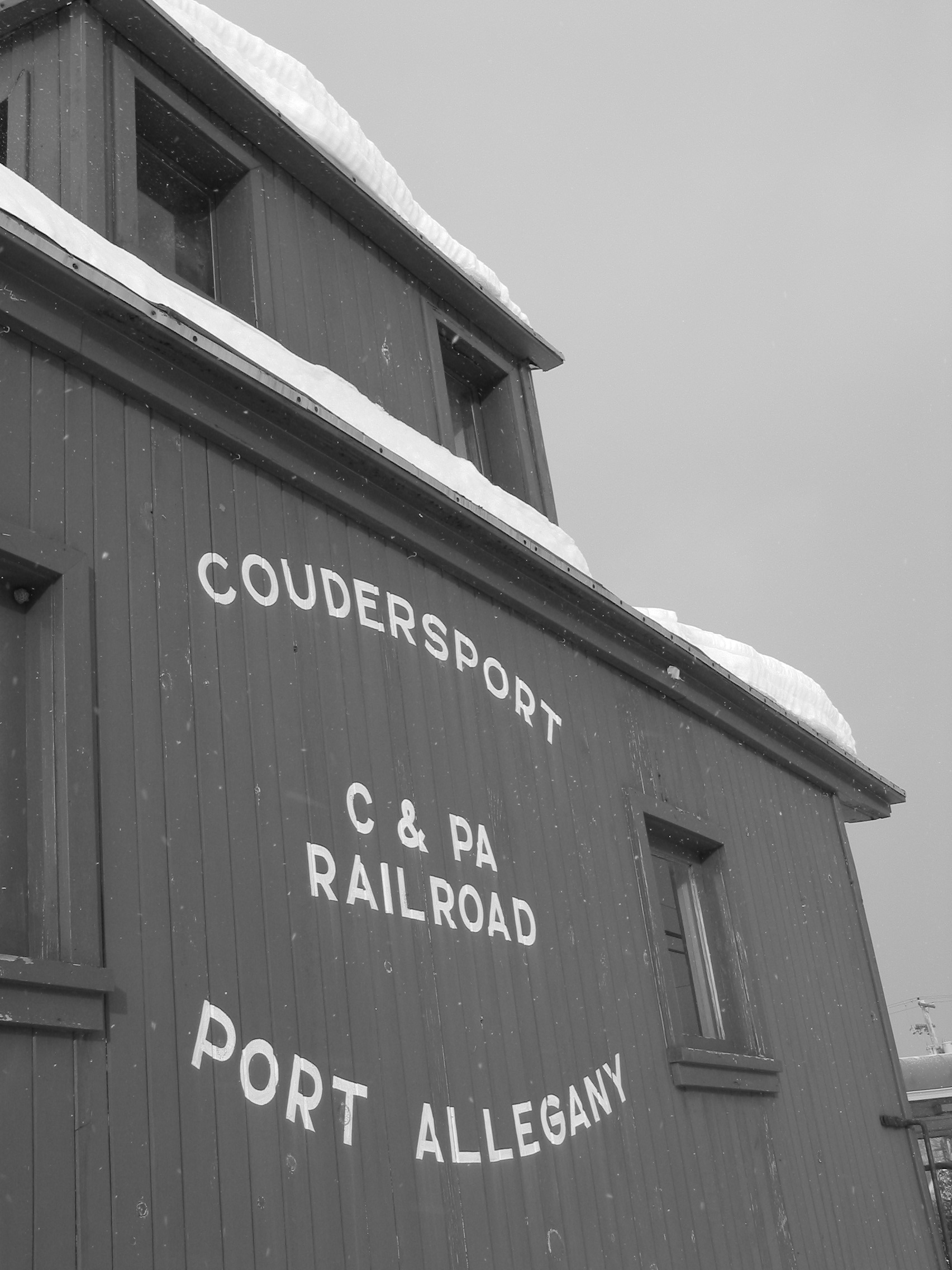
A former caboose used by the C&PA, displayed near the former depot in Coudersport, PA

== History ==
Both Potter and McKean Counties were formed from part of Lycoming County on March 26, 1804. Coudersport was settled in 1807 and incorporated as a borough from Eulalia Township in 1848. Coudersport has served as the county seat of Potter County since 1835. Port Allegany was settled in 1815 and incorporated as a borough from Liberty Township on April 4, 1882.

The original plan for a railroad along the Allegheny River between Coudersport and Port Allegany was as a part of the Jersey Shore, Pine Creek and Buffalo Railway (JSPC&B), which was incorporated on February 17, 1870. The JSPC&B was originally planned to run from the vicinity of Williamsport west to Jersey Shore, then north up Pine Creek and down the Allegheny River past Coudersport and west to Port Allegany, as part of a larger route to Buffalo, New York. The Panic of 1873 stopped work, although some grading of the proposed line was done in 1874 and 1875.

On April 6, 1882 an organizational meeting was held in Olean, NY attended by H.B. Hamlin, F.W. Knox, A.G. Olmstead, A.M. Benton, F.H. Arnold, F.H. Root, C.B. Barse, and C.S. Cary. On May 1, 1882 the C&PA was chartered. The unfinished JSPC&B route along the Allegheny River was acquired for $7000 and construction was carried out that summer with the first train reaching Coudersport on September 7, 1882. The 3 ft (914 mm) gauge Coudersport and Port Allegany Railroad unofficially opened the next day with the formal opening occurring on September 26, 1882. The original 17-mile (27 km) line between Coudersport and Port Allegany was initially operated with two 4-4-0 steam locomotives. Both locomotives were built by the Brooks Locomotive Works. Engine number one was purchased from the Olean, Bradford & Warren for $3000. Engine number two was purchased from Brooks for $8250 on November 29, 1882.

There was a connection with the 4 ft 8 1/2 in (1,435 mm) standard gauge Western New York and Pennsylvania Railroad at Port Allegany, and a Ramsey Car Transfer Apparatus was added there in 1883 so that lumber from mills on the line could be more easily loaded onto 4 ft 8 1/2 in (1,435 mm) standard gauge cars. In 1887 a 2-6-0 locomotive was added, and in July the next year the stockholders voted to convert the line to 4 ft 8 1/2 in (1,435 mm) standard gauge, which was done on June 16, 1889.

A subsidiary of the railroad built an extension 5 miles (8.0 km) southeast along Mill Creek to the village of Sweden Valley in Sweden Township in Potter County. By 1895 a new line was extended northeast along the Allegheny River east to Newfield Junction in Ulysses Township, Pennsylvania, where it connected with the Buffalo and Susquehanna Railroad, and then on to a new eastern terminus at the borough of Ulysses, where it linked with the Fall Brook Railway. The Fall Brook became part of the New York Central Railroad system in 1899, and a year later the western terminus at Port Allegany connected with the Pennsylvania Railroad, so the Coudersport and Port Allegany Railroad connected the two major rail lines in that part of Pennsylvania.

The Coudersport and Port Allegany Railroad began construction on a new brick and sandstone station in Coudersport in 1899 and opened it in January 1900. Coudersport's population grew from 1,525 in 1890 to 3,217 in 1900, and this was also when the lumber industry was at its height. The lumber industry declined soon after, and in 1924 the line from Newfield Junction to Ulysses was abandoned. The western 9 miles (14 km) of the line to Port Allegany were destroyed in a July 18, 1942 flood and the railroad connected to other lines only through Newfield Junction after this. In 1964 the railroad was purchased by the Wellsville, Addison and Galeton Railroad, which finally abandoned it on December 8, 1970. The borough of Coudersport bought the station in 1975 and restored it, adding a new roof. The station was listed on the National Register of Historic Places on November 21, 1976. As of 2009 it serves as the police station and office building for the borough government of Coudersport, and is the only remaining building from the Coudersport and Port Allegany Railroad.
