= Jennie Phelps Purvis =

American writer, pioneer, and social reformer

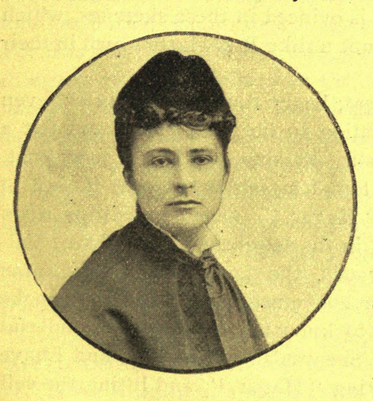
- Phelps in an 1893 publication.
- Born: Hanna Jane Phelps; February 23, 1831; Addison, New York, U.S.
- Died: November 16, 1924 (aged 93); Modesto, California, U.S.
- Resting place: Masonic Cemetery (now Acacia Memorial Park), Modesto
- Other names: Jennie, Janette
- Occupations: writer, suffragist, social reformer
- Spouse: Richard Benjamin Purvis (m. 1876)
- Writing career
- Pen name: Hagar
- Period: California pioneer
- Subjects: temperance; suffrage

Jennie Phelps Purvis (née, Phelps; pen name, Hagar; February 23, 1831 – November 16, 1924) was an American writer, suffragist, temperance reformer, and a California pioneer. She was well-known in literary circles in her early life -counting Bret Harte, Mark Twain, and Joaquin Miller as friends- and for some years, was a prominent officer and member of the California state suffrage society.

== Early life and education ==
Hanna Jane (nicknames, "Jennie" and "Janette") Phelps (Note: Standard Genealogical Publishing Company (1901) records her maiden name as Jennie Philips.) was born in Addison, New York, February 23, 1831, and received her education there.

== Career ==
In 1863, she came to California via Panama, and for many years made her home at Oakland and San Francisco. She had a talent for writing and in San Francisco engaged in newspaper work. She contributed to The Daily Alta California, the San Francisco Evening Bulletin, The San Francisco Call, San Francisco Examiner, and the San Francisco Chronicle, all notable journals in their time. She wrote for years under the pen name of "Hagar", and contributed liberally not only to papers on the West coast, but also to Eastern journals.

This literary activity helped her develop relationships with Bret Harte, Mark Twain, Joaquin Miller, and Mrs. Joaquin Miller (Minnie Myrtle Miller), and many other celebrities of the day associated with the Coast and known internationally.

From the age of 14, Purvis was a stanch suffragist, working as a contemporary of and in close touch with Susan B. Anthony, Elizabeth Cady Stanton, the Rev. Olympia Brown and others, from the start of the movement in California. Five women suffragists, of whom Purvis was one, met in San Francisco in the 1860s and organized the first woman's suffrage association as a state organization, Purvis being made secretary of the association. In the election of 1910, when equal suffrage carried in California, Stanislaus County was the banner county of the state. During this time, she was chair of Stanislaus and Merced counties and so active in distributing their literature that the supply eventually ran out.

Purvis was also prominent in the Woman's Christian Temperance Union (WCTU), and was second vice-president of the California State WCTU. She was also state superintendent of anti-narcotics, and succeeded in getting the bill passed which prohibited the sale of tobacco to boys under 16 in the legislative session of 1891. Two years later, her efforts to have another bill passed, this time prohibiting the sale of cigarettes to boys under 21, were successful; but Governor James Budd vetoed the measure. She was a delegate to the national WCTU convention that met at Boston in 1891. The distinctive feature of the "Frances Willard convention", held in Boston in 1891, was that it was a world's WCTU and a national WCTU convention combined, the national following immediately upon the close of the world's convention. This was the first world's convention ever held in the United States. It is not surprising that, after such activity, she should have contributed much to the Ensign, the California state organ of the WCTU Among other noted publications realized or proposed by Purvis was a book on suffrage, which was appreciated so much by Horace Greeley that he wrote a friend asking him to find a publisher, recommending the volume in a very complimentary way.

== Personal life ==
In 1876, in Stockton, California, she married Richard Benjamin Purvis (b. 1844), who became the popular sheriff of Stanislaus County from his election in 1884 until the time of his death in 1906.

Purvis belonged to the First Christian Church of Modesto, California, and the Modesto Women's Improvement Club. She was a member of the Order of the Eastern Star and Rebekahs, in both of which she served as an officer. Some of these activities added to her interest in California history, and she was enthusiastic for the preservation of the annals of the past.

Jennie Phelps Purvis died at her home in Modesto, November 16, 1924, having lived there for 24 years. She was interred at the Masonic Cemetery (now Acacia Memorial Park).
