= John Rigas =

American businessman (1924–2021)

- Rigas in 2018
- Born: November 14, 1924; Wellsville, New York, U.S.
- Died: September 30, 2021 (aged 96); Coudersport, Pennsylvania, U.S.
- Education: Management Engineering - (B.S.)
- Known for: Founder of Adelphia Communications Corporation
- Political party: Republican
- Criminal charges: Bank fraud; Wire fraud; Securities fraud
- Criminal penalty: 15 years imprisonment
- Spouse: Doris Nielsen
- Children: Timothy J. Rigas, Michael J. Rigas; James P. Rigas; Ellen Rigas Venetis
- Parent(s): Demetrios "James" Rigas; Eleni Brazas Rigas

John James Rigas (November 14, 1924 – September 30, 2021) was an American businessman who was one of the founders of Adelphia Communications Corporation, which at its peak was one of the largest cable TV companies in the United States. He was also the majority owner of the Buffalo Sabres franchise of the National Hockey League. In 2005, he was convicted on multiple charges of fraud and sentenced to 15 years in prison, serving nine of those years before being released due to declining health.

== Beginnings ==
Rigas was born in Wellsville, New York, to Greek immigrants James and Eleni (Brazas) Rigas, who sought a better life in the United States for their children. John had three siblings: Gus, Mary, and Katherine. James was an entrepreneur of some repute in Wellsville, beginning as a shoe-shine man, then in 1921 introducing the Texas hot to Wellsville. The Texas hot stand remains in operation, currently co-owned by John's nephew, Chris Rigas. John's first job was, at the age of nine, busing tables. After graduating from Wellsville High School, he was drafted into the U.S. Army and was placed in the 20th Armored Division in 1943, seeing combat in France. His division ended up being involved in the liberation of Dachau concentration camp in April 1945. After the war ended he returned to life in Wellsville and, soon afterward, enrolled at Rensselaer Polytechnic Institute in Troy, New York. He studied engineering and earned a bachelor of science degree in management engineering. He was also a member of the Nu Theta chapter of Phi Mu Delta. He then returned to Wellsville, only to take a job with the Sylvania corporation in Emporium, Pennsylvania.

== Business career ==
In 1952, Rigas started his first business venture by buying a movie theater in Coudersport, Pennsylvania, a town midway between Wellsville and Emporium. He borrowed the money from his family and friends, including his godfather, James Lucas, to purchase the theater and started operating it in the evenings while he worked days at the Sylvania plant.

The Rigas cable television enterprise first started in Coudersport when the family purchased the town's TV cable franchise. Always looking to grow his company, John had teamed with his brother Gus to start Adelphia after buying out his partners. They borrowed heavily to buy more and more suburban cable companies and avoided city franchises. Eventually, Adelphia became the largest cable provider outside Philadelphia, Pittsburgh, Cleveland, and South Florida and had systems reaching over 30 states and over 5.6 million customers. Adelphia also launched product lines such as high-speed cable Internet service and long-distance telephone service.

Rigas was honored numerous times, including honorary degrees by three universities. In 1997 he bought the Buffalo Sabres from team co-founder Northrup R. Knox, installing his son Timothy as team president. After considering buying a professional baseball franchise, Rigas opted to relaunch the Wellsville Nitros as a collegiate summer baseball team in 1998. His political contributions include a total of $50,750 to the Republican Party, with which he had affiliation, and placed a strong value in conservative Republican family values.

== Criminal indictment and incarceration ==
Rigas resigned from his position as CEO of Adelphia in May 2002 after being indicted for bank fraud, wire fraud, and securities fraud. His sons Timothy and Michael, as well as James Brown and Michael Mulcahey, were also charged with participation in these crimes. The executives were accused of looting the corporation by concealing $2.3 billion in liabilities from corporate investors and of using corporation funds as their funds.

John Rigas was convicted of the charges in the summer of 2004, and on June 27, 2005, was sentenced to 15 years in federal prison. Adelphia Corporation filed for bankruptcy after it acknowledged that the three Rigases had taken $3.1 billion in loans that were not recorded on the books. In 2005 John and Timothy were charged with tax evasion and pleaded not guilty in October 2005. On January 27, 2012, the charge of tax evasion was officially dismissed. Following John's arrest, the NHL virtually stripped him of his authority over the Sabres. After more than a year as a ward of the league, the franchise was purchased by another western New York multibillionaire, Tom Golisano.

On May 24, 2007, the Second Circuit Court of Appeals upheld John's and Timothy's 2004 convictions on 17 of the original 18 counts. On June 27, 2007, John and Timothy were ordered to report to prison on August 13 for their fraud convictions. On August 13 John and Timothy reported to the Federal Correctional Complex, Butner, located about 45 minutes northwest of Raleigh, North Carolina, unsuccessful in their request to be allowed to serve their time together at a facility close to their homes in Coudersport, Pennsylvania. On November 1, 2007, after a 20-day bidding war involving 31 bidders, the palatial $30 million former Adelphia Headquarters building in Coudersport was sold to an undisclosed buyer at auction for $3.4 million.

On March 3, 2008, the Supreme Court rejected the final appeal without comment. The case was Rigas v. U.S., 07-494. John's original release date was September 4, 2020, but a federal judge reduced his sentence by three years, and his new release date was scheduled to be January 23, 2018. Rigas applied for a presidential pardon in January 2009, but George W. Bush left office without making a decision. Rigas sold his house in Indigo Run, Hilton Head Island, South Carolina, to pay for legal fees. Sometime during the week of November 6, 2011, both John and Timothy were transferred to the Low Security Facility of the Allenwood Federal Correctional Complex in Pennsylvania. The Allenwood FCC is located 2 miles north of Allenwood on Route 15, about 11 miles south of Williamsport.

== Illness and death ==
On December 14, 2015, Rigas' lawyers announced that he was terminally ill with bladder cancer and had between one and six months to live. Rigas was diagnosed with cancer before his conviction and, under his sentencing, could seek compassionate release if he had less than three months to live. Judge Kimba Wood issued an order allowing for Rigas's release on February 19, 2016. Rigas was alive and well enough to make public appearances by June 2016.

Rigas died in Coudersport, Pennsylvania, on September 30, 2021, at the age of 96.

Sporting positions
Preceded by Seymour H. Knox III; Northrup R. Knox	Buffalo Sabres owner 1996–2002	Succeeded by Tom Golisano
