= Maple Street Historic District (Addison, New York) =

Historic district in New York, United States

- U.S. National Register of Historic Places
- U.S. Historic district
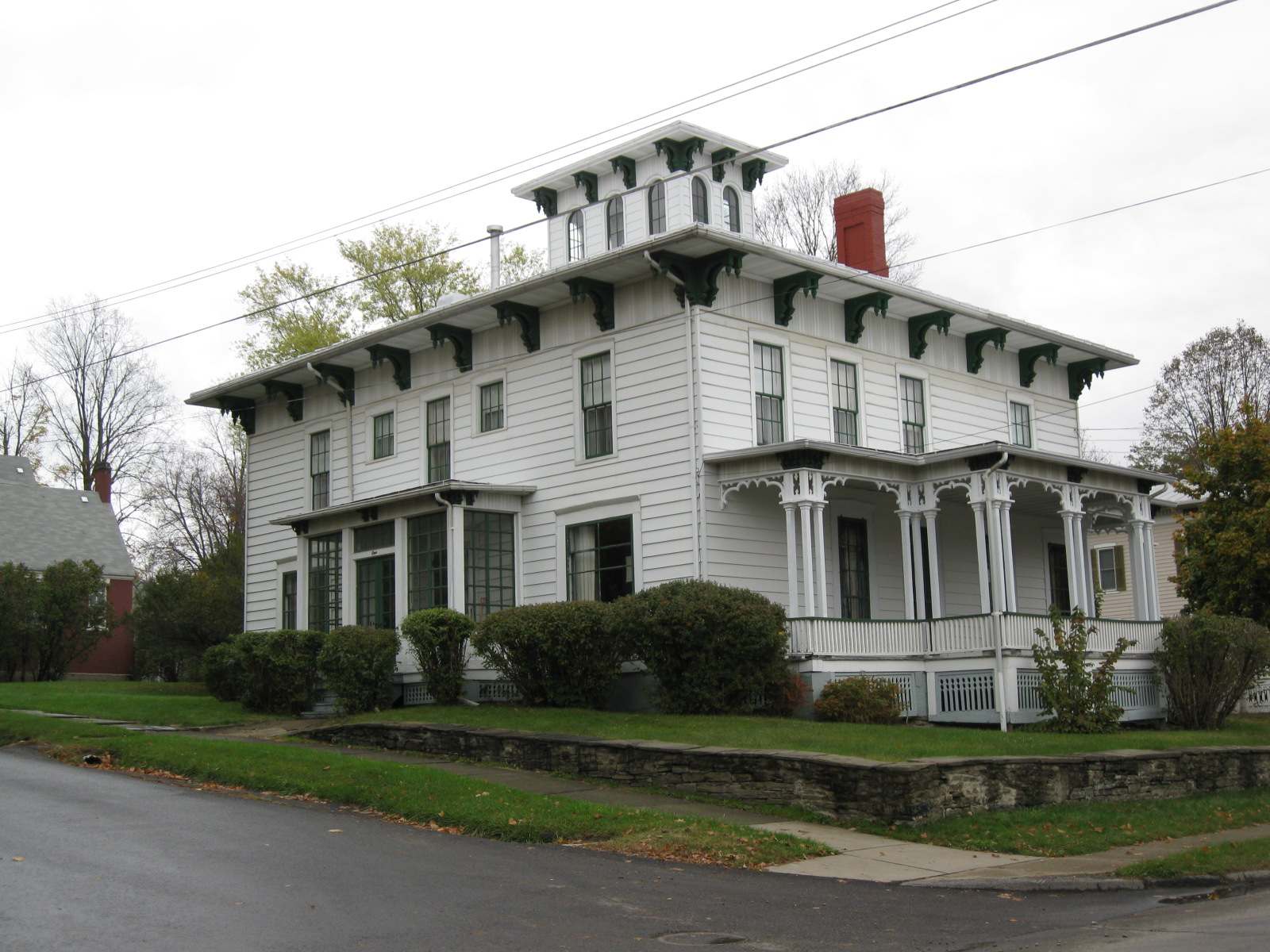
- Historic District home, Addison NY, October 2009

- Location within New York Location within the United States
- Location: Roughly, Maple St. from Academy Rd. to Curtis Sq. Park, Addison, New York
- Coordinates: 42°6′34″N 77°13′48″W
- Area: 35 acres (14 ha)
- Built: 1832
- Architect: Barney & Chapman; Clark & Christman, et al.
- Architectural style: Italian Villa, Gothic Revival, Greek Revival
- NRHP reference No.: 96001441
- Added to NRHP: December 06, 1996

Maple Street Historic District is a national historic district located at Addison in Steuben County, New York. The district contains 42 contributing buildings (39 residences and three churches), two contributing structures (public squares), 23 contributing outbuildings (carriage houses, sheds, wellhouse, outhouse, garages), and four contributing objects (stone hitching posts). The district encompasses Addison's most prestigious residential enclave whose buildings face inward toward Curtis Square, Maple Street, and Wombough Square. It includes Church of the Redeemer, also listed on the National Register.

It was listed on the National Register of Historic Places in 1996.
