= Pioneer Telephone =

Company based in Portland, Maine

- Type: Private
- Industry: Telecommunications
- Headquarters: Portland, Maine, United States
- Website: www.pioneertelephone.com

Pioneer Telephone is a privately held company with headquarters in Portland, Maine, United States, it was founded by Peter Bouchard, who continues to run the company today. It is a facility-based telecommunication carrier of long-distance, local and UCaas telephone service in the United States. As of October 2011, Pioneer Telephone had more than 2,700,000 customers in 48 states.

In 2005, Pioneer Telephone purchased the long-distance telephone business of bankrupt Adelphia Communications Corporation for about $22.5M and $180m in indemnification guarantees; the sale was completed later that year. Adelphia's phone service had 1,110,000 customers in 27 states(telephone & long-distance services).

In November 2008, Pioneer Telephone purchased all the residential and small-to-medium-sized business customers from Level 3 Communications in Denver, CO Pioneer's upper management stated that they would roll out local service in 15 states in 2009.
