= William Wombough House =

Historic house in New York, United States

- U.S. National Register of Historic Places
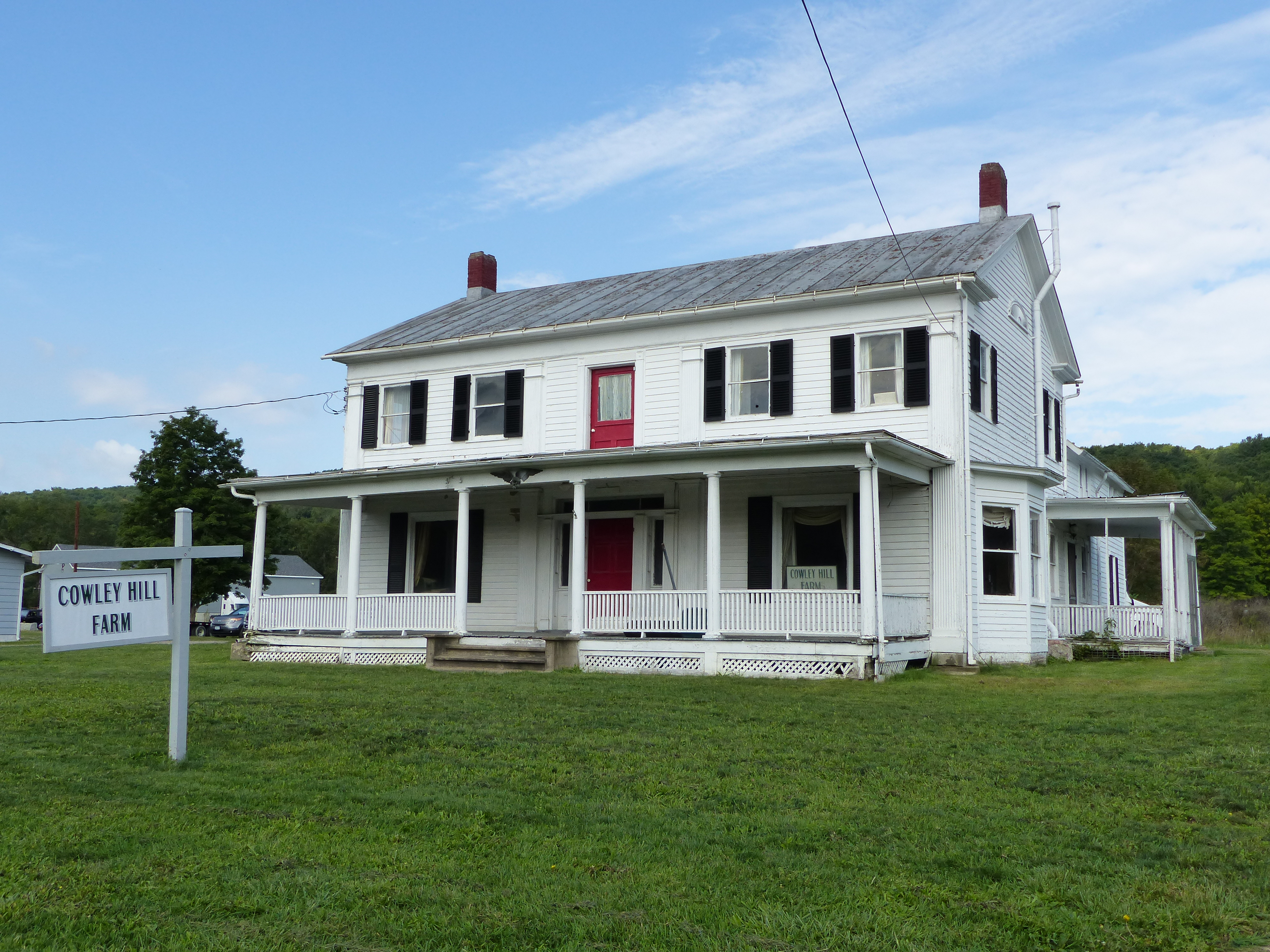

- Location within New York Location within the United States
- Location: 145 E. Front St., Addison, New York
- Coordinates: 42°6′52″N 77°13′7″W
- Area: 0 acres (0 ha)
- Built: 1830
- Architectural style: Early Republic, Greek Revival
- NRHP reference No.: 03000593
- Added to NRHP: July 03, 2003

William Wombough House is a historic home located at Addison in Steuben County, New York. It is an I-shaped, 2 1/2-story, side-gabled frame residence with interior ridge chimneys at each end of a metal clad roof. It was built about 1830 and is in the transitional late-Federal / early Greek Revival style.

It was listed on the National Register of Historic Places in 2003.
