= Bud Heine =

American baseball player (1900–1976)

- Second baseman / Third baseman
- Born: September 22, 1900; Elmira, New York, U.S.
- Died: September 2, 1976 (aged 75); Fort Lauderdale, Florida, U.S.
- Batted: Left Threw: Right

MLB debut
- October 1, 1921, for the New York Giants

Last MLB appearance
- October 1, 1921, for the New York Giants

MLB statistics
- Games played: 1
- At-bats: 2
- Hits: 0
- Stats at Baseball Reference

Teams
- New York Giants (1921)

William Henry "Bud" Heine (September 22, 1900 – September 2, 1976) was an American professional baseball player whose career spanned four seasons, which included one appearance in Major League Baseball (MLB) with the New York Giants (1921). In the majors, Heine had two at-bats, while playing second base in the field. The majority of his career was spent in the minor leagues as a third baseman. In the minors, Heine had a career batting average of .287 with 206 hits, 35 doubles, 11 triples, and three home runs over three seasons. Before the start of his baseball career, Heine attended St. Bonaventure University (1920–21). Aside from his baseball career, he also played semi-professional basketball. During his playing career, he stood at 5 feet 8 inches (173 cm) and weighed in at 145 pounds (66 kg). He batted left-handed, while throwing right.

== Early and personal life ==
Heine was born on September 22, 1900, in Elmira, New York, to William C. Heine and Ellen ("Nellie") Sheahan of Germany and New York, respectively. Bud Heine had two older sisters, Helen J. and Marjorie. Their father was a merchant and retired professional baseball player. During his baseball career, he played for 25 different minor league teams over 13 seasons (1888–1902). In 1920, Bud Heine and his family were living in Addison, New York. He attended St. Bonaventure University for two years. (1920–21). At school, he was the captain of the basketball team. He also played baseball at the school. Heine was married to Marguerite Sharp. In late-May 1922, Heine's wife gave birth to their son, William, Jr. Four years later, the Heines had a daughter. In the late 1920s, Heine and his family moved to Battle Creek, Michigan. Heine died on September 2, 1976, in Fort Lauderdale, Florida. He was cremated.

== Baseball career ==
In 1920, Heine played for the Painted Post Imperials, which was a semi-professional baseball team from Elmira, New York. On October 1, 1921, Heine made his Major League Baseball debut with the New York Giants. In that game, he played second base, and in two at-bats he had not hits. That game would prove to be his last in the majors. Heine reported to spring training with the Giants in 1922. In early March, Giants manager John McGraw sold Heine to the minor league Indianapolis Indians of the American Association. He then reported to Indians training camp in Texas, but never made an appearance for that team. Early in the year during the 1922 season, he played third base for the semi-pro Elmira Arctics. News papers described Heine as "quick". On June 26, he was released by the Arctics. In late-June that season, he signed with a semi-pro team named the All-Stars. In July, Heine was involved in an automobile accident, limiting his playing time for about a week.

Heine signed with the Class-C Durham Bulls of the Piedmont League in 1923. On the year, he batted .285 with 145 hits, 21 doubles, nine triples, and three home runs in 121 games played. Defensively, he made 19 errors in 256 total chances. In 1924, Heine made his return to Durham. In 17 games played, he batted .257 with 18 hits, and six doubles. In the field, he committed one error in 59 total chances. In 1925, he signed with the Class-C Greensboro Patriots, who were also members of the Piedmont League. Heine batted .309 with 43 hits, eight doubles, and two triples in 38 games played. He committed eight errors in 111 total chances at third base.

== Basketball career ==
Heine signed with the Elmira Arms works team in December 1922. In 1925, Heine played for the semi-pro Olean Metros.
