= Adelphia Communications Corporation =

Former American cable television company

- Type: Public
- Traded as: Nasdaq: ADLAE
- Industry: Telecommunications
- Founded: 1952; 74 years ago
- Founder: John Rigas
- Defunct: July 31, 2006; 20 years ago
- Fate: Filed for Chapter 11 bankruptcy, assets were acquired by Time Warner Cable and Comcast
- Successor: Time Warner Cable (now: Spectrum); Xfinity
- Headquarters: Coudersport, Pennsylvania; Greenwood Village, Colorado
- Key people: William T. Schleyer (chairman and CEO); Ronald (Ron) Cooper (president and COO); Vanessa Wittman (EVP and CFO)
- Products: Cable television, Internet service provider
- Revenue: $3.61 billion (2003)
- Number of employees: 275 (2006)
- Website: adelphiarestructuring.com

Adelphia Communications Corporation was an American cable television company with headquarters in Coudersport, Pennsylvania. It was founded in 1952 by brothers Gus and John Rigas after the pair purchased a cable television franchise for US$300. Combining various cable properties, the company became one of the most successful in the United States and reached over two million subscribers in 1998. In addition to cable television, Adelphia later started providing high-speed internet, phone services and voice messaging for businesses.

Despite its success, the company filed for bankruptcy in 2002 amid an internal corruption scandal. An investigation was launched and later revealed that some members of the Rigas family used $2.3 billion to illegitimately purchase personal luxuries. A trial for the case was launched and saw John Rigas being sentenced to 15 years in prison, while his son Timothy Rigas received a sentence of 20 years. John Rigas was released in 2016 as a result of health issues.

Following the file for bankruptcy, a plan for company restructuring was approved in 2004; amongst other things the plan included a full cash payment to possession lenders, bank lenders and joint venture partners. The first asset to be sold was the telephone services in 27 states. It was acquired by Pioneer Telephone of Portland, Maine. The purchase price was $22.6 million and $180 million in indemnification of churn for the remaining bundled assets. In July 2006, Adelphia sold its cable operations to Comcast (which now uses the Xfinity brand) and Time Warner Cable (then part of Time Warner, later known as WarnerMedia) for $17.6 billion. In 2007, Time Warner Cable officially succeeded Adelphia as a publicly traded corporation but the cable assets were spun out in 2009 and was acquired by Charter Communications in 2016 and it is now known as Spectrum.

The Rigas family established a successor company, Zito Media, to provide cable service in some areas not sold to Time Warner, including most cable systems in Potter County, Pennsylvania.

== History ==
Adelphia Communications Corporation was founded in 1952 by brothers John and Gus Rigas; they purchased a cable television franchise based in Coudersport, Pennsylvania for US$300. After 20 years in the business, Rigas incorporated the company under the name "Adelphia" which in the Greek language means "brothers". In the upcoming years, the Rigas family combined various cable properties under the company name and made it public. In 1989, the company established Adelphia Media Services which would allow commercial opportunities on local, regional and national levels. Two years after, in 1991, the company created the Adelphia Business Solutions subsidiary which provided different types of products to businesses such as, high-speed Internet, phone services, and voice messaging. In 1998, Adelphia reached two million users in subscription.

== 2002 internal corruption scandal ==
On March 27, 2002, Adelphia officials announced that $2.3 billion in unrecorded debt was collected via co-borrowings between Adelphia and other Rigas family entities under the family's private trust, Highland Holdings. Legally, the Rigas entities should have paid the debt. However, if they were not able to, the company would be held accountable. An investigation was launched and later revealed that the Rigas family used the funds to illegitimately purchase personal luxuries. The alleged purchases included Christmas trees, 17 company cars and 3,600 acres of timberland purchased for $26 million for their home yard. Rigas resigned from his position as CEO in May 2002 after being indicted for bank fraud, wire fraud, and securities fraud. The Securities and Exchange Commission (SEC) described the scandal as "one of the most extensive financial frauds ever to take place at a public company."

=== Trial ===
A trial for the case was launched. Federal prosecutors proved that the Rigases used complicated cash-management systems to spread money around to various family-owned entities and as a cover for stealing $100 million for themselves. In June 2005, John and Timothy Rigas were found guilty for "looting and debt-hiding". John Rigas was sentenced to 15 years in prison, while Timothy received a sentence of 20 years. In 2007, both men were ordered to report to Butner Federal Correctional Complex. On December 14, 2015, Rigas' lawyers announced that he was terminally ill with bladder cancer and had between one and six months to live. Rigas was diagnosed with cancer prior to his conviction and, under his sentencing, could seek compassionate release if he had less than three months to live. Judge Kimba Wood issued an order allowing for Rigas's release on February 19, 2016. Rigas survived for five more years after his release; he died September 30, 2021, age 96.

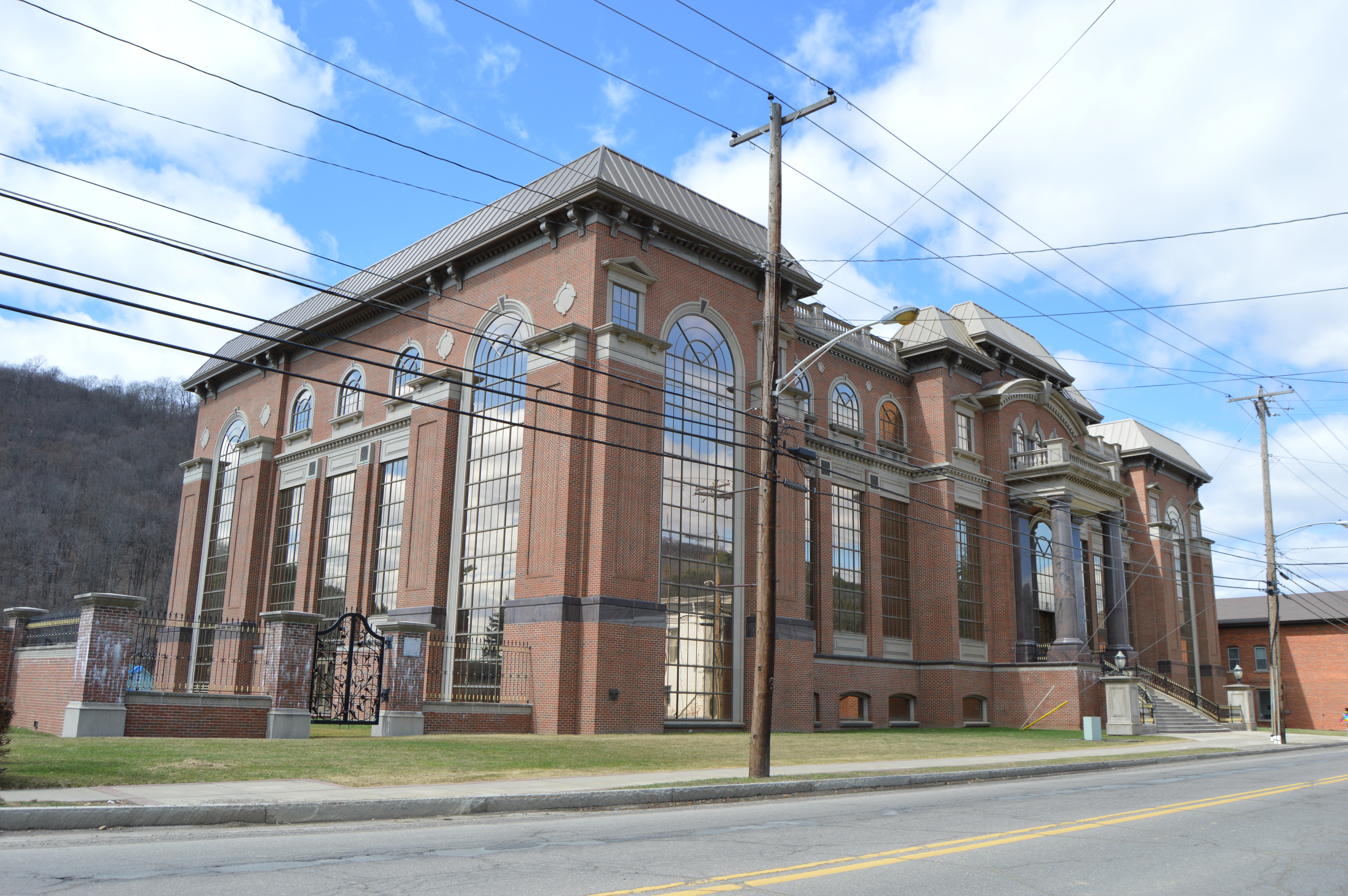
Former headquarters in Coudersport, completed just as bankruptcy hit. Now used by successor Zito Media

The New York Times noted that this differed considerably from other accounting scandals like Enron and Worldcom, saying, "the one trait that distinguishes the Rigases from virtually every other culprit on Wall Street is that they didn't sell their stock. The evidence suggests less that they intended to defraud than that they intended to hide inconvenient facts until they could be righted. This is also, of course, against the law; it's just a more tragic crime than ordinary looting."

== Further developments ==
After struggling to find an alternative, Adelphia Corporation filed for bankruptcy on June 26, 2002. Subsequently, the company asked for a $1.5 billion loan to restructure under bankruptcy protection. According to BankruptcyData.com, the company's bankruptcy ranks 12th by assets in the United States history of bankruptcies. A plan for its restructuring was approved on February 25, 2004. According to William Schleyer, then-CEO of the company, "Adelphia’s proposed plan of reorganization is the product of relentless effort and reflects the dedication of Adelphia’s management and bankruptcy teams, and our almost 15,000 employees in 30 states and Puerto Rico who are helping to make Adelphia a better company." Amongst other things, the plan included a full cash payment to possession lenders, bank lenders, joint venture partners and, no payments to claims and equities of the Rigas family.

In July 2006, Adelphia sold its cable operations to Comcast and Time Warner for $17.6 billion in cash and shares in Time Warner's cable unit. Out of that amount, Time Warner shares and $15 billion were planned to be administered to creditors. Following that, Adelphia ceased to do business. The effective date of the Adelphia Plan of Reorganization occurred on February 13, 2007. Time Warner Cable was allowed to distribute approximately $6 billion in shares to Adelphia stakeholders and succeed Adelphia as a publicly traded corporation. The Rigas family established a successor company, Zito Media, to continue to provide cable service in some areas not sold to Time Warner, including most cable systems in Potter County, Pennsylvania.

== Sports ventures ==
=== Buffalo Sabres and sports broadcasting ===
In addition to its cable interests, Adelphia had substantial interests in the sporting world. In 1990, it launched Empire Sports Network, a regional sports network serving central and western New York. Adelphia supplemented Empire with a sports radio station, WNSA, in 2000. As an individual, John Rigas acquired the ownership of the National Hockey League (NHL)'s Buffalo Sabres hockey club in 1997. At least some of the misappropriated Adelphia funds were being used to subsidize the Sabres, who were consistently losing money at the time.

On the day John Rigas and his sons were arrested, the NHL seized control of the Sabres franchise. The team remained a ward of the league until 2003, when Tom Golisano purchased the team. WNSA was sold off in 2004 and is now WGR-FM. Empire Sports limped along until 2005, when it was finally shut down; its sports rights were split between MSG (which acquired the Sabres television rights) and Time Warner Cable Sports (which acquired most of the remaining assets and shut down in 2017).

=== Adelphia Coliseum ===
One previous marker of Adelphia's success before its bankruptcy included its 1999 purchase of the naming rights to a football stadium, Adelphia Coliseum in Nashville, Tennessee. It was built as the home of the Tennessee Titans. Adelphia was not a well-known company in Nashville, and had only a small presence in the area (its subsidiary, Adelphia Business Solutions, a commercial telecommunications provider, was offered as an alternative to the dominant BellSouth). The name was taken off the stadium in 2002 after Adelphia missed a payment and subsequently filed for bankruptcy. It was known as simply "The Coliseum" for four years before becoming LP Field in 2006. Today, it is known as Nissan Stadium.

== See also ==
- Corporate abuse
