= Addison Village Hall =

Historic village hall in New York, U.S.

- U.S. National Register of Historic Places
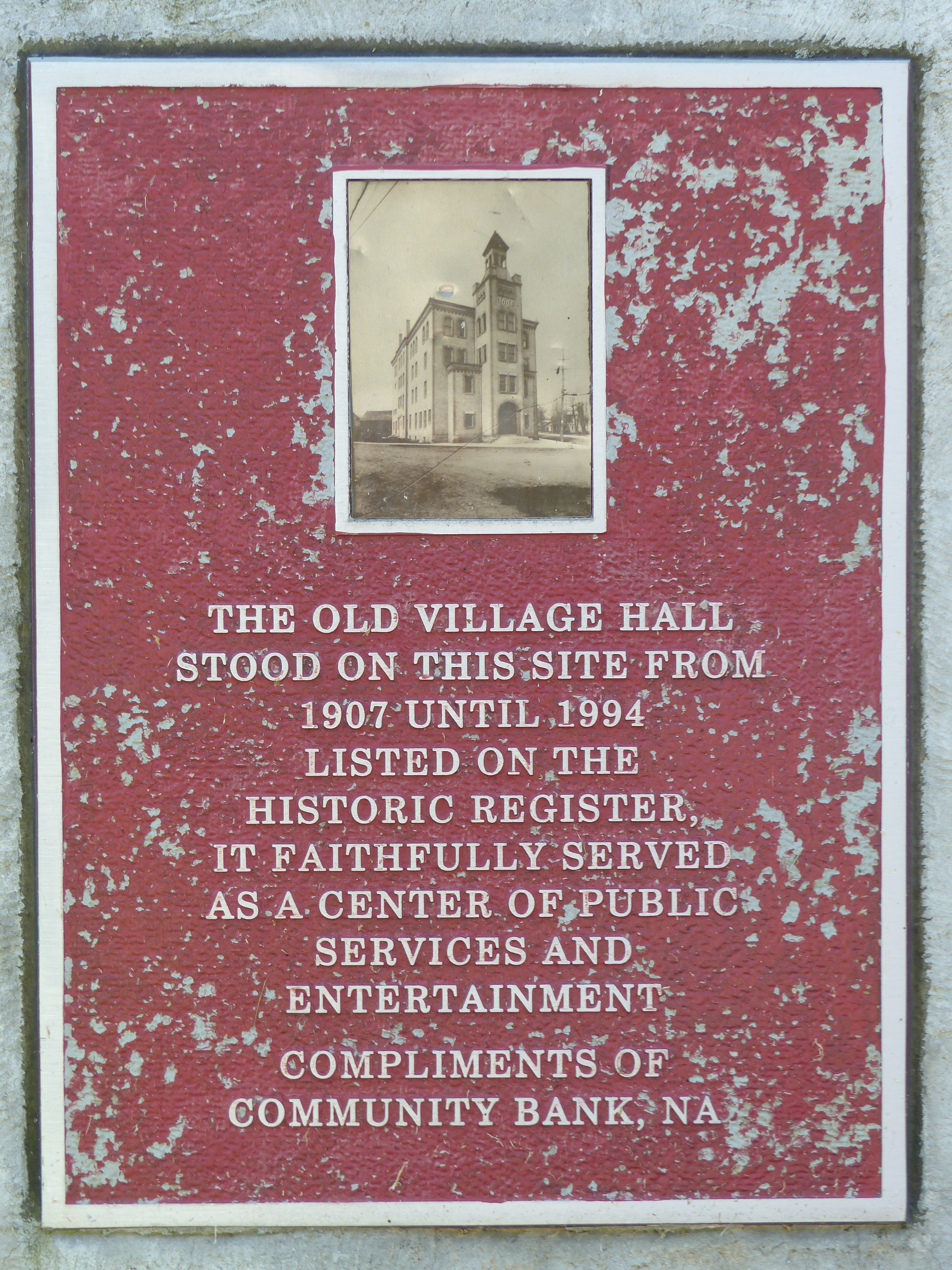
- Plaque in the Addison Old Village Hall Memorial Park

- Location within New York Location within the United States
- Location: Tuscarora and South Sts., Addison, New York
- Coordinates: 42°6′17″N 77°14′6″W
- Area: 0.3 acres (0.12 ha)
- Built: 1906
- NRHP reference No.: 80002771
- Added to NRHP: April 23, 1980

Addison Village Hall was a historic village hall located at Addison in Steuben County, New York. It was built in 1906 and is a four-story, greyish brown brick rectangular structure. The facade featured a projecting center pavilion that reaches five stories and is flanked by identical two story, one bay wings. It was demolished in 1994 and the site is now occupied by the Old Village Hall Memorial Park.

It was listed on the National Register of Historic Places in 1980.
