= List of Pennsylvania state historical markers in Potter County =

Location of Potter County in Pennsylvania

This is a list of the Pennsylvania state historical markers in Potter County.

This is intended to be a complete list of the official state historical markers placed in Potter County, Pennsylvania by the Pennsylvania Historical and Museum Commission (PHMC). The locations of the historical markers, as well as the latitude and longitude coordinates as provided by the PHMC's database, are included below when available. There are 11 historical markers located in Potter County.

== Historical markers ==
Marker title	Image	Date dedicated	Location	Marker type	Topics
Allegheny River		August 22, 1947	PA 49 near Smith Road, 11 miles northeast of Coudersport; 41.85492°N 77.87556°W	Roadside	Environment, Native American, Transportation
Austin Flood Disaster		September 30, 1994	At site, PA 872, 2 miles north of Austin; 41.65285°N 78.084407°W	Roadside	Environment
David Zeisberger		August 22, 1947	East Main Street (PA 49), 1 mile E of Harrison Valley; 41.93431°N 77.63644°W	Roadside	Early Settlement, Native American, Religion
David Zeisberger		August 22, 1947	PA 49 near Smith Road, Raymond; 41.8551°N 77.87522°W	Roadside	Early Settlement, Native American, Religion
David Zeisberger		August 22, 1947	2nd Street (US 6) at Allegheny River, Coudersport; 41.77445°N 78.01779°W	Roadside	Early Settlement, Native American, Religion
David Zeisberger - PLAQUE		October 1, 1916	County Courthouse, 2nd Street (US 6) & Main Street (PA 44), Coudersport; 41.77473°N 78.02075°W	Plaque	Early Settlement, Native American, Religion
Jersey Shore Pike		August 19, 1947	Grand Army of the Republic Highway (US 6), 3.5 miles east of Coudersport; 41.760533°N 77.960533°W	Roadside	Roads, Transportation
Lymansville		August 19, 1947	Junction US 6 & PA 872, 2 miles east of Coudersport; 41.77288°N 77.98395°W	Roadside	Cities & Towns
Ole Bull's Colony		August 19, 1947	Cherry Springs Road (PA 44), near West Branch Road, at Cherry Springs State Park; 41.66113°N 77.82186°W	Roadside	Ethnic & Immigration, Government & Politics, Government & Politics 19th Century
Pennsylvania		January 1, 1949	In median opposite 391 Main Street (PA 449), Genesee; 41.993650°N 77.871183°W	Roadside	Government & Politics, Government & Politics 17th Century, William Penn
Potter County		July 31, 1982	County Courthouse, 2nd Street (US 6) & East Street, Coudersport; 41.77467°N 78.02025°W	City	Government & Politics, Government & Politics 19th Century

== See also ==
- List of Pennsylvania state historical markers
- National Register of Historic Places listings in Potter County, Pennsylvania
