= Coudersport station =

- Coudersport and Port Allegany Railroad Station
- U.S. National Register of Historic Places
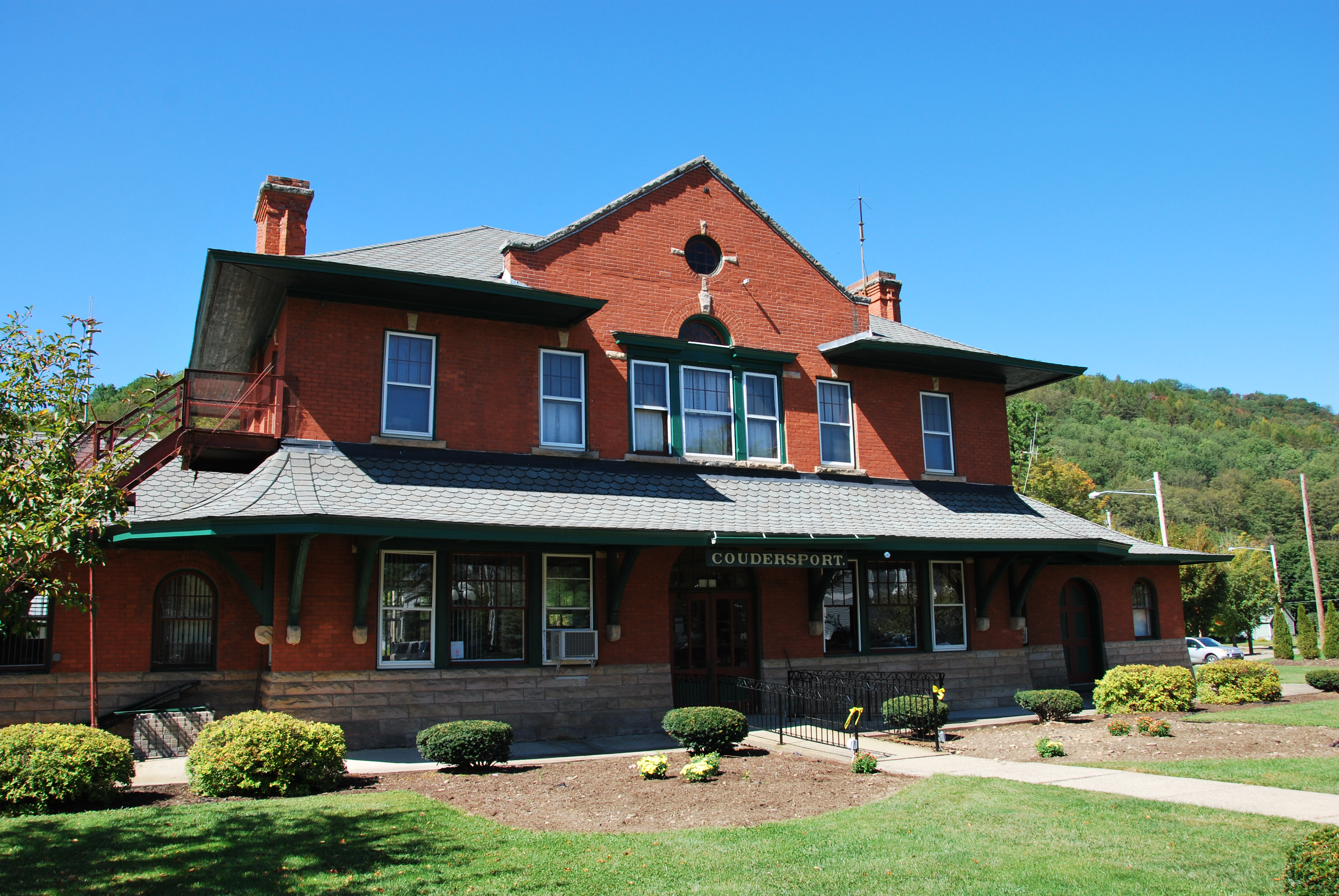
- Station in September 2009

- Location within Pennsylvania Location within the United States
- Location: 201 S. West St., Coudersport, Pennsylvania
- Coordinates: 41°46′15″N 78°1′19″W
- Built: 1899
- Architect: Button, H.A.
- NRHP reference No.: 76001673
- Added to NRHP: November 21, 1976

The Coudersport and Port Allegany Railroad Station (also known as the Coudersport Depot) is a railroad station in Coudersport, Pennsylvania, in the United States. It was built by the Coudersport and Port Allegany Railroad in 1899 and opened in January 1900 during the lumber industry boom in Potter County. When the lumber ran out, the railroad's business decreased and in 1964 the line and station were purchased by the Wellsville, Addison and Galeton Railroad. The station was abandoned in 1970 and was unoccupied until 1975, when the borough of Coudersport purchased it. The borough restored it and put a new roof on, then used the building for office space. The station was listed on the National Register of Historic Places on November 21, 1976.

The structure is red brick and sandstone, with a central portion and two wings. The center is 2 1/2 stories tall, each wing is 1 1/2 stories. The depot has a bellcast gable roof all the way around on the ground floor and a second on much of the second story. As of 2009 it serves as the office building for the borough government of Coudersport, and is the only remaining structure from the Coudersport and Port Allegany Railroad.

== History ==
Potter County was formed from part of Lycoming County on March 26, 1804. Coudersport was settled in 1807 and incorporated as a borough from Eulalia Township in 1848. Coudersport has served as the county seat of Potter County since 1835.

The original plan for a railroad along the Allegheny River between Coudersport and Port Allegany was as a part of the Jersey Shore, Pine Creek and Buffalo Railway (JSPC&B), which was incorporated on February 17, 1870. The JSPC&B was originally planned to run from the vicinity of Williamsport west to Jersey Shore, then north up Pine Creek and down the Allegheny River past Coudersport and west to Port Allegany, as part of a larger route to Buffalo, New York. The Panic of 1873 stopped work, although some grading of the proposed line was performed in 1874 and 1875.

In the early 1880s the route along the Allegheny River was sold and in October 1882 the narrow gauge Coudersport and Port Allegany Railroad opened on the 17-mile (27 km) line between Coudersport and Port Allegany. The railroad was converted to standard gauge in 1889 and six years later the line was extended east to Newfield Junction (where it connected with the Buffalo and Susquehanna Railroad) and then on to a new eastern terminus at Ulysses, where it linked with the Fall Brook Railway. This became part of the New York Central Railroad system in 1899, and a year later the western terminus at Port Allegany connected with the Pennsylvania Railroad, so the Coudersport and Port Allegany Railroad connected the two major rail lines in that part of Pennsylvania.

The Coudersport and Port Allegany Railroad began construction on a new station in 1899 and opened it in January 1900. The basic station building cost $6,000, with another $2,000 to $4,000 spent on plumbing and other amenities. Coudersport's population grew from 1,525 in 1890 to 3,217 in 1900, and this was also when the lumber industry was at its height. The lumber industry declined soon after, and in 1924 the line to Ulysses was abandoned. The western 9 miles (14 km) of the line to Port Allegany were destroyed in a 1942 flood and the railroad connected to other lines only through Newfield Junction. In 1964 the railroad was purchased by the Wellsville, Addison and Galeton Railroad, which finally abandoned it and the station on December 8, 1970. The borough of Coudersport bought the station in 1975 and restored it, adding a new roof. The station was listed on the National Register of Historic Places on November 21, 1976. As of 2009 it serves as the police station and office building for the borough government of Coudersport, and is the only remaining structure from the Coudersport and Port Allegany Railroad.

== Structure ==
The Coudersport and Port Allegany Railroad Station is built of red brick and local sandstone. The walls are made with a course of sandstone 3 feet (0.91 m) tall at the base, with the rest brick; there are two brick chimneys on either end of the central section. The building has a center section which is two and a half stories tall and two wings, one on each end, each one and half stories tall. The station is 100 feet (30 m) long, with a width of 30 feet (9.1 m) in the main section and 20 feet (6.1 m) in each wing. The first story windows and doors have semi-circular arches at the top, while the second story windows are rectangular. There is a bellcast gable roof that goes all the way around the center section and both wings of the first story, and a second bellcast gable roof goes most of the way around the second story.

Originally the first story of the central section was the ticket office and waiting area, with a waiting room for women in one wing, and a room for baggage in the other wing. The second story had a two small private offices, a large office "for the superintendent and his assistants", and two small storage rooms. The third story of the center section was for storage. The building was built with both electric and gas lighting, and gas heat.
