= Main Street Historic District (Addison, New York) =

Historic district in New York, United States

- U.S. National Register of Historic Places
- U.S. Historic district
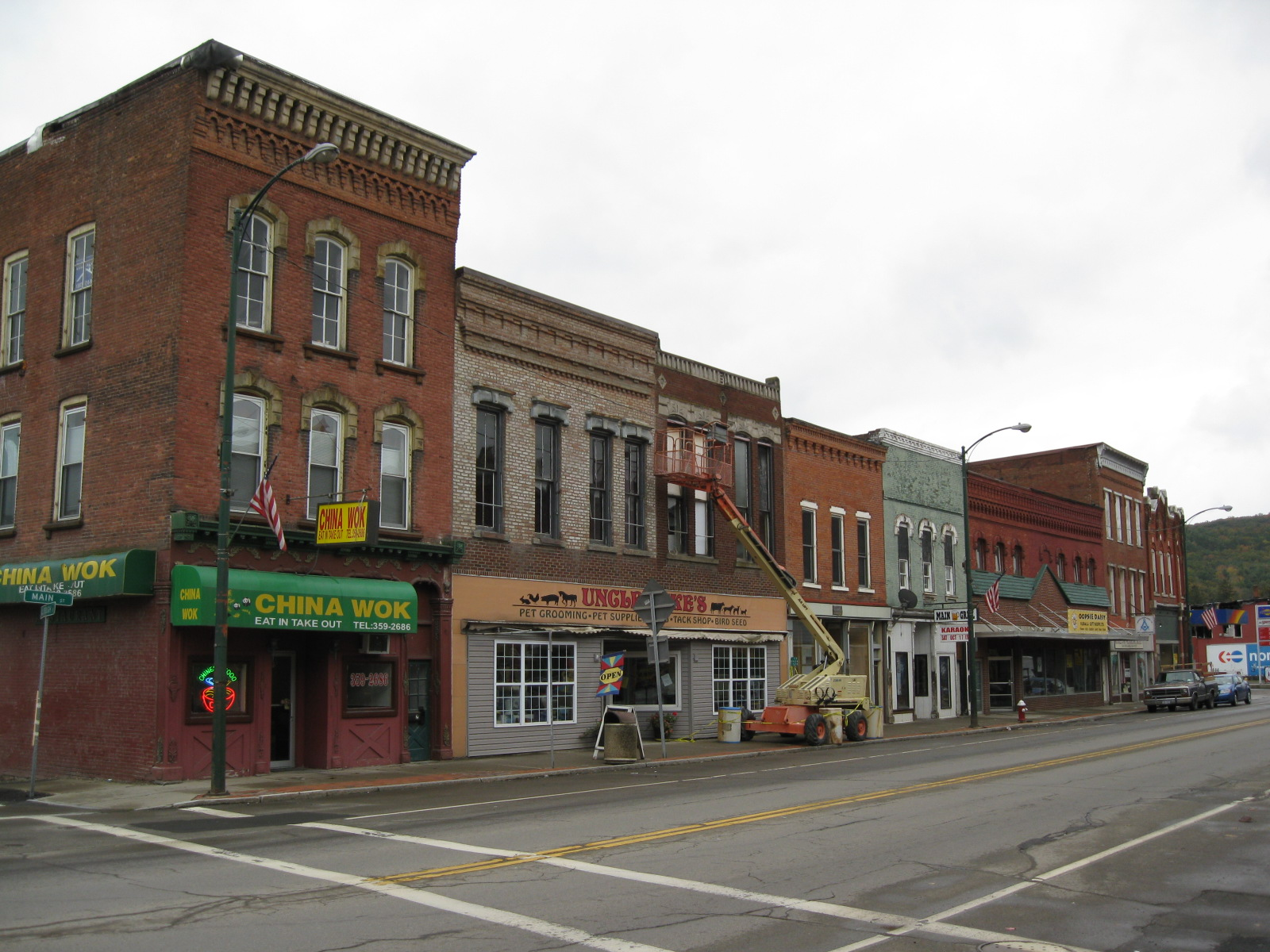
- Addison, New York, October 2009

- Location within New York Location within the United States
- Location: Main St. from the Canisteo R. to the jct. of Main, Steuben, Tuscarora, South Sts. and Valerio Pkwy., Addison, New York
- Coordinates: 42°6′21″N 77°14′4″W
- Area: 5.4 acres (2.2 ha)
- Built: 1879
- Architect: Gregory, Eugene; Brewster, John, O.P., et al.
- Architectural style: Greek Revival, Gothic, Italianate
- NRHP reference No.: 96000488
- Added to NRHP: April 26, 1996

Main Street Historic District is a national historic district located at Addison in Steuben County, New York. The district contains 26 contributing buildings. The buildings are largely commercial in use, with apartments, offices, and / or storage space on the upper floors.

It was listed on the National Register of Historic Places in 1996.
