= Church of the Redeemer (Addison, New York) =

Historic church in New York, United States

- U.S. National Register of Historic Places
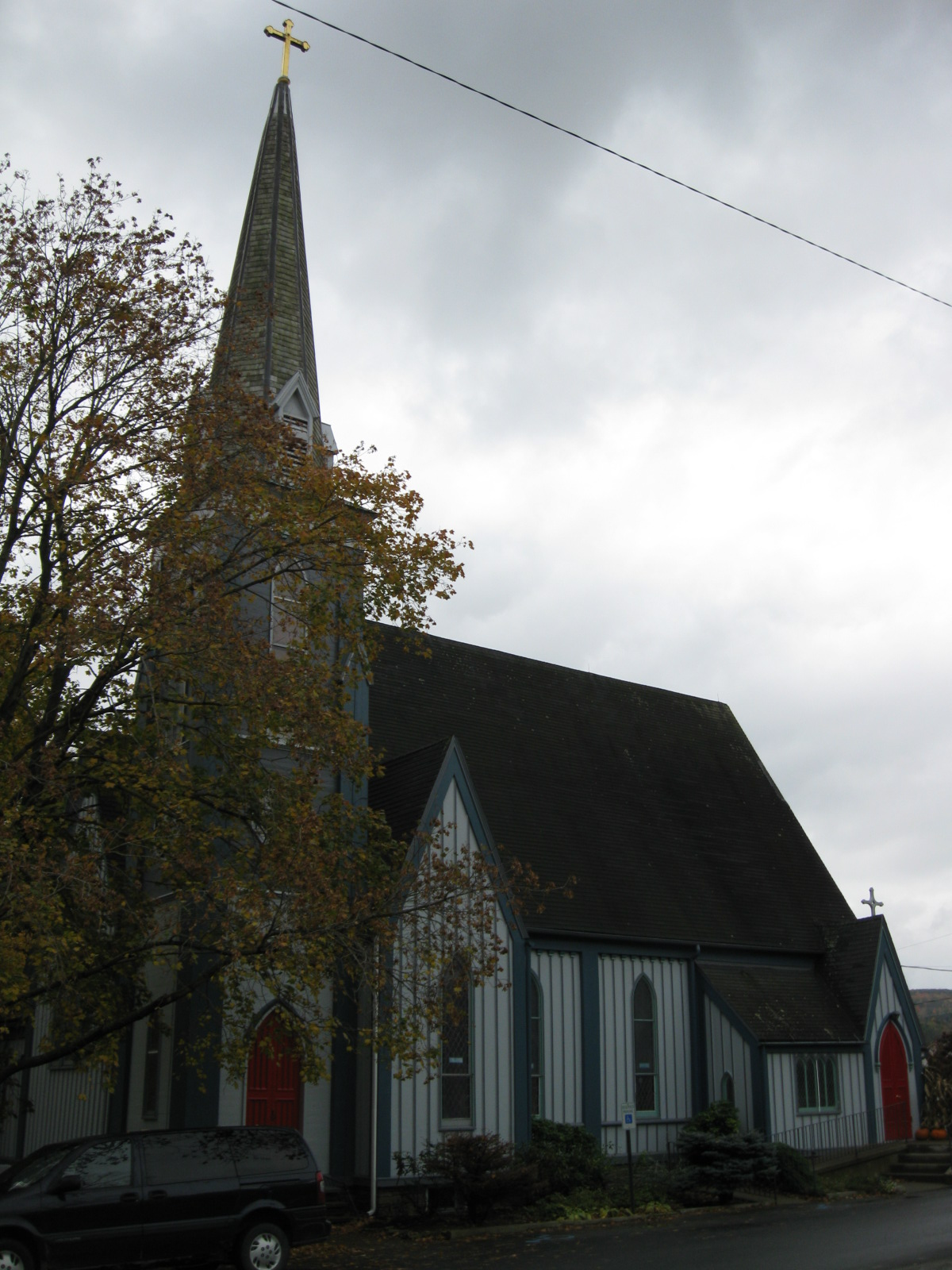
- Church of the Redeemer, Addison NY, October 2009

- Location within New York Location within the United States
- Location: Jct. of Park and Wall Sts., Addison, New York
- Coordinates: 42°6′30″N 77°13′58″W
- Area: less than one acre
- Built: 1859
- Architect: McGrath, H.
- Architectural style: Carpenter Gothic
- NRHP reference No.: 92001577
- Added to NRHP: November 12, 1992

The Church of the Redeemer is an historic Episcopal church and parsonage located at 1 Wombaugh Square in Addison, Steuben County, New York. The complex includes a Carpenter Gothic style board and batten church constructed in 1859. It is included in the Maple Street Historic District.

It was listed on the National Register of Historic Places in 1992. The Church of the Redeemer is still an active parish in the Episcopal Diocese of Rochester. The Rev. Michael Hopkins is the current priest-in-charge.
