= Wellsville, Addison and Galeton Railroad =

Wellsville, Addison & Galeton Railroad
Overview
- Reporting mark: WAG
- Locale: Pennsylvania; New York
- Dates of operation: 1954–1979
- Predecessor: Baltimore & Ohio Railroad

Technical
- Track gauge: 4 ft 8 1/2 in (1,435 mm) standard gauge

The Wellsville, Addison & Galeton Railroad (reporting mark WAG) was formed in 1954 to operate a section of Baltimore & Ohio Railroad (B&O) trackage which had been isolated from the rest of the system by a 1942 flood. This trackage was acquired by the B&O as part of the purchase of the Buffalo & Susquehanna Railroad (B&S) in 1932. It is known as the operator of a set of GE centercab diesels supplemented by F7 locomotives in later years.

== History ==
WAG boxcar

The original Wellsville, Addison & Galeton Railroad (WA&G) consisted of two main lines originating from Galeton, Pennsylvania. One ran northwest to Wellsville, New York, where it connected to the Erie Railroad; the other ran northeast to Addison, New York and also connected to the Erie. Two short segments completed the trackage, one running east to Ansonia, Pennsylvania and a connection with the New York Central Railroad, and another southwest to Burrows, representing the stub end of the former connection to the B&O. This totalled 91 miles of trackage and was sold for $250,000, along with six ex-B&S steam locomotives, four cabooses, and a miscellany of work equipment, to the H.E. Salzberg Company, which operated a number of other short lines. Operations began in 1956.

The future of the line was driven by line conditions and traffic. Major customers included a Sinclair refinery in Wellsville and tanneries in Elkland and Westfield. These latter supplied the sobriquet of "The Sole Leather Line", which was painted on some equipment.

The Burrows branch was abandoned soon after WA&G began operations. The Elkland-Addison portion followed in 1960. In 1964 the line expanded to include the Coudersport & Port Allegany Railroad (C&PA), which crossed at Newfield Junction on the Wellsville line. The CP&A was abandoned in 1973.

By the time Hurricane Agnes hit the northeast in 1972, WA&G was reduced to a 40-mile operation between Galeton to Elkland, with a branch (and its only outside connection) to Ansonia. A fire destroyed the Elkland tannery in 1973; and after more floods the railroad filed for abandonment in 1975. Approval to abandon was granted by the ICC in 1978, and the final freight ran on March 13, 1979. The line remained open until November to retrieve equipment and ship locomotives to various buyers.

== Equipment ==
The B&O supplied six class E-60 Consolidations (built in 1907-1908) as part of the original sale. The new railroad intended to use diesel power instead, and only one of the six (#3127) was ever lettered for the WA&G. However, the first diesels purchased, a pair of Whitcomb 75-tonners, proved inadequate for the grades on the Wellsville line, and so the steamers were pressed into service briefly at the opening of the line, only to be scrapped in 1955-56.

More adequate power came in as a series of General Electric centercab models. The first, a 50-ton unit, served briefly at the opening of the line; then in 1955 a pair of 125-ton units were purchased from Ford, to be joined by five 132-ton units the following year. These were retired in stages through the 1960s, and all were scrapped by 1973 except for #1700 which is preserved at the Lake Shore Railway Museum in North East, PA.

Starting in 1968 as the centercabs wore out, they were replaced by a series of F7 units, all of which came as trade-in units from General Electric. Through 1972, a total of eight units were purchased, including one B unit (for parts) and an FP7A. Only two were retained by the WA&G; all others were transferred to the Louisiana & North West Railroad, another Salzberg line.

In 1978, the WA&G's two steel cabooses joined the F7s in Louisiana; the older wooden cabooses are now in private hands. Like a number of short lines in the late 1950s, the WA&G made a profitable business out of cars in interchange service. This began with a purchase of 78 wooden boxcars, and eventually 761 cars were in service. These cars grew less profitable through the years, and the refusal of Penn Central to renew a lease of 300 wooden cars put an end to their use, though metal-sided cars remained in service.

== Surviving Equipment ==
The WA&G was beset by fire and flood over the years, and little physical evidence of the line remains. However, three of the F7 units went to museums and two were included in a group which ended up with the Connecticut Department of Transportation (currently stored on the Naugatuck Railroad). WAG 2200 & 2300 (both F7A's) were sold off to Pittsburgh, PA's short lived commuter train. PATrain died off on April 28th, 1989. 2200 & 2300 then went to the Naugatuck Railroad. However, in 2011, 2200 & 2300 (now known as CDOT 6690 & 6691) were delivered to the Galveston Railroad Museum. They were painted into a ATSF 315 & 316. Three of the line's cabooses are known to survive in private ownership. Former snowplow X-3710 is currently stored at the Rochester & Genesee Valley Railroad Museum. GE 132 ton centercab locomotive WAG#1700 (ex-Ford #1006), the only one still in existence, is preserved at the Lake Shore Railway Historical Society Museum in North East, Pennsylvania, 10 miles from the GE locomotive assembly plant that built it.
