= Addison (village), New York =

Addison, New York
- Village
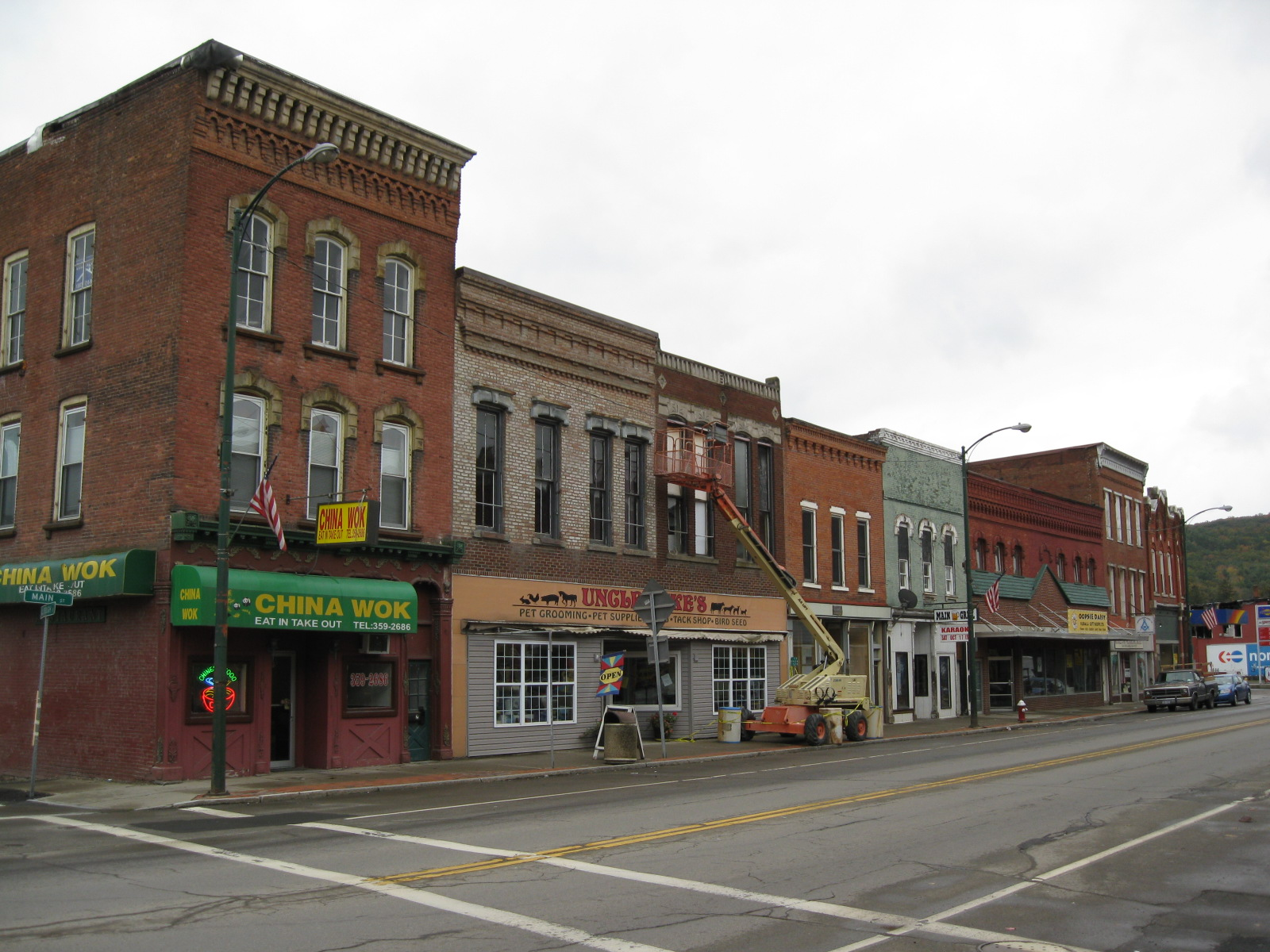
- Downtown Addison

- Location within the state of New York
- Coordinates: 42°6′28″N 77°13′56″W
- Country: United States
- State: New York
- County: Steuben

Area
  - Total: 1.89 sq mi (4.90 km^{2})
  - Land: 1.89 sq mi (4.90 km^{2})
  - Water: 0 sq mi (0.00 km^{2})
- Elevation: 997 ft (304 m)

Population (2020)
  - Total: 1,561
  - Density: 824.7/sq mi (318.42/km^{2})
- Time zone: UTC-5 (Eastern (EST))
  - Summer (DST): UTC-4 (EDT)
- ZIP code: 14801
- Area code: 607
- FIPS code: 36-00276
- GNIS feature ID: 0942177
- Website: https://www.villageofaddisonny.gov/

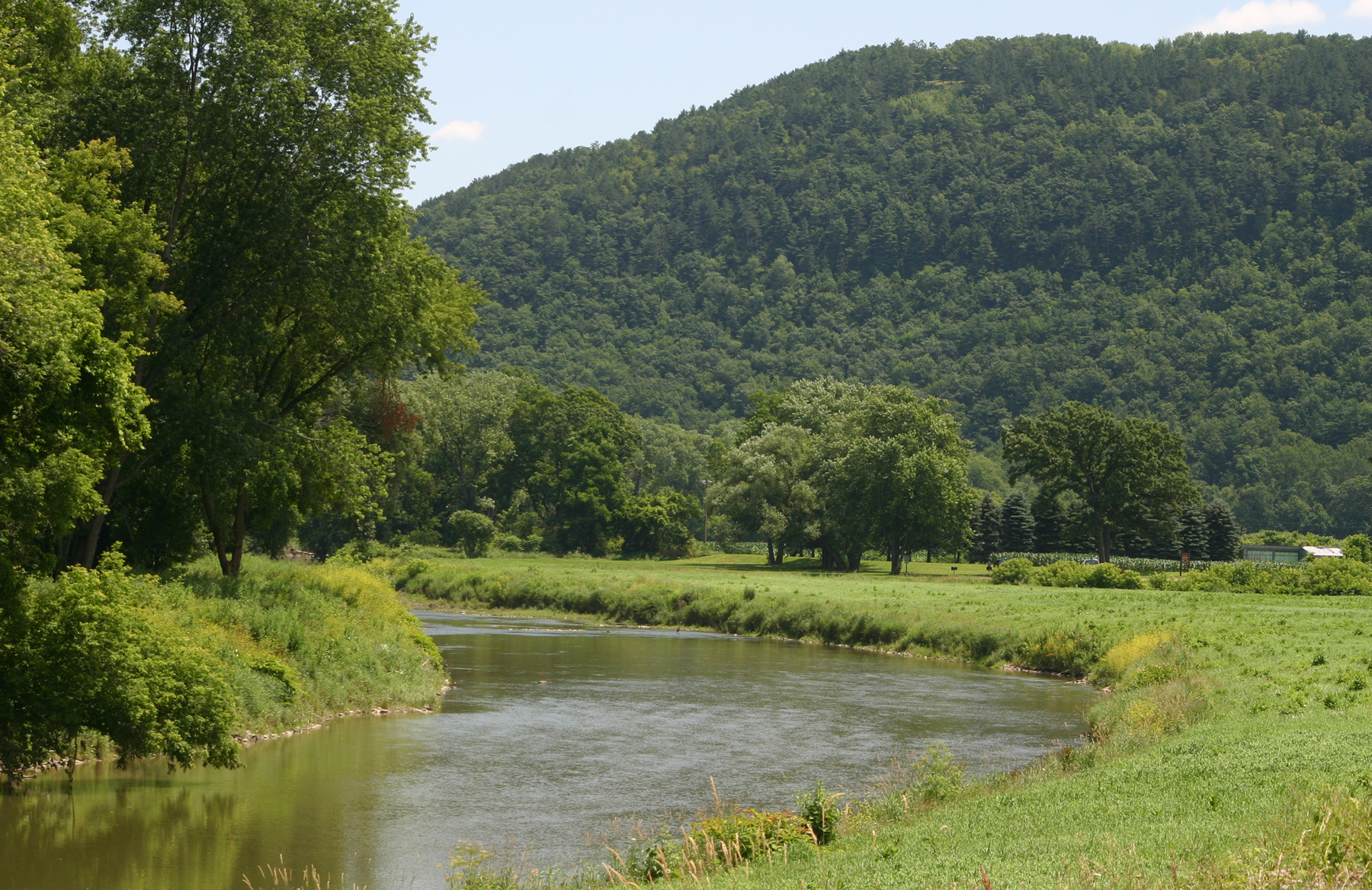
Canisteo River below Addison, NY

Addison is a village in Steuben County, New York, United States, in the southeast part of the town of the same name, and southwest of the city of Corning. The population was 1,763 at the 2010 census. The village and the surrounding town are named after the author Joseph Addison.

== History ==
The village was first incorporated in 1854 and re-incorporated in 1873.

Company E, 34th New York Volunteer Infantry Regiment, was principally recruited here during the American Civil War.

The population of Addison in 1990 was 1,842.

The Addison Village Hall, Church of the Redeemer, and William Wombough House are individually listed on the National Register of Historic Places. Also listed are the national historic districts: Main Street Historic District and Maple Street Historic District.

In May 2024, a clerk pled guilty to stealing from the village over the course of two decades. She was sentenced to nine years in prison, ordered to pay $1.1 million in restitution, and stripped of her state pension. The state law allowing judges to reduce or revoke pensions of officials was passed in 2011, and this was its first use in sentencing.

== Geography ==
Addison is located at 42°6′28″N 77°13′56″W.

According to the United States Census Bureau, the village has a total area of 1.9 square miles (4.9 km^{2}), all land.

Steuben County Route 119 (former New York State Route 432) and New York State Route 417, along with County Roads 1 and 5 pass through the village. Tuscarora Creek flows into the Canisteo River in the village. Pinnacle State Park and Golf Course is east of the village, which itself is in the Southern Tier of New York.

Addison is on the New Jersey-to-Buffalo Main Line of the Norfolk Southern Railway. Trains of the Canadian Pacific Railway operating under haulage arrangements also operate on this line through Addison. This line was opened in 1850 and known, prior to its 1999 acquisition by the Norfolk Southern, under the following names: New York & Erie Rail Road; Erie Railway; New York, Lake Erie & Western Railroad; Erie Railroad; Erie-Lackawanna Railroad; Erie Lackawanna Railroad; Erie Lackawanna Railway, and Consolidated Rail Corporation [Conrail].

From 1882 to 1961 Addison was also served by the Wellsville, Addison & Galeton Railroad and predecessors ( most notably the Baltimore & Ohio Railroad [1932—1956], the Buffalo & Susquehanna Railroad 1898–1932, and the Addison & Northern Pennsylvania Railroad]. The WA&G line was abandoned in 1961 by order of the Interstate Commerce Commission in order to promote highway transportation.

=== Climate ===
Climate data for the village of Addison, New York, 1991–2020 normals, extremes 1893–2020
Month	Jan	Feb	Mar	Apr	May	Jun	Jul	Aug	Sep	Oct	Nov	Dec	Year
Record high °F (°C)	74 (23)	73 (23)	85 (29)	92 (33)	98 (37)	100 (38)	106 (41)	103 (39)	103 (39)	99 (37)	84 (29)	71 (22)	106 (41)
Mean daily maximum °F (°C)	33.1 (0.6)	35.8 (2.1)	44.0 (6.7)	57.5 (14.2)	69.6 (20.9)	77.9 (25.5)	82.0 (27.8)	80.8 (27.1)	73.7 (23.2)	61.5 (16.4)	48.7 (9.3)	38.0 (3.3)	58.6 (14.8)
Daily mean °F (°C)	23.5 (−4.7)	25.0 (−3.9)	32.5 (0.3)	44.3 (6.8)	55.5 (13.1)	64.6 (18.1)	69.1 (20.6)	67.8 (19.9)	60.5 (15.8)	49.2 (9.6)	38.2 (3.4)	29.5 (−1.4)	46.6 (8.1)
Mean daily minimum °F (°C)	13.8 (−10.1)	14.1 (−9.9)	21.1 (−6.1)	31.1 (−0.5)	41.3 (5.2)	51.3 (10.7)	56.2 (13.4)	54.8 (12.7)	47.4 (8.6)	37.0 (2.8)	27.6 (−2.4)	21.0 (−6.1)	34.7 (1.5)
Record low °F (°C)	−35 (−37)	−28 (−33)	−22 (−30)	1 (−17)	18 (−8)	16 (−9)	34 (1)	34 (1)	24 (−4)	10 (−12)	−4 (−20)	−26 (−32)	−35 (−37)
Average precipitation inches (mm)	1.80 (46)	1.61 (41)	2.52 (64)	3.34 (85)	3.55 (90)	3.19 (81)	4.22 (107)	3.55 (90)	3.66 (93)	3.81 (97)	2.54 (65)	2.26 (57)	36.05 (916)
Average snowfall inches (cm)	13.3 (34)	11.8 (30)	9.6 (24)	1.0 (2.5)	0.1 (0.25)	0.0 (0.0)	0.0 (0.0)	0.0 (0.0)	0.0 (0.0)	0.3 (0.76)	2.1 (5.3)	10.0 (25)	48.2 (121.81)
Average precipitation days (≥ 0.01 in)	13.7	10.9	13.8	14.4	15.3	13.9	11.7	11.9	11.4	15.1	13.6	14.9	160.6
Average snowy days (≥ 0.1 in)	10.0	8.0	5.8	1.0	0.1	0.0	0.0	0.0	0.0	0.1	2.4	8.0	35.4
Source 1: NOAA
Source 2: National Weather Service

== Demographics ==
Historical population
Census	Pop.	Note	%±
1880	1,596		—
1890	2,166		35.7%
1900	2,080		−4.0%
1910	2,004		−3.7%
1920	1,699		−15.2%
1930	1,538		−9.5%
1940	1,617		5.1%
1950	1,920		18.7%
1960	2,185		13.8%
1970	2,104		−3.7%
1980	2,028		−3.6%
1990	1,842		−9.2%
2000	1,797		−2.4%
2010	1,763		−1.9%
2020	1,561		−11.5%
U.S. Decennial Census

As of the census of 2000, there were 1,797 people, 724 households, and 467 families residing in the village. The population density was 947.1 inhabitants per square mile (365.7/km^{2}). There were 804 housing units at an average density of 423.7 per square mile (163.6/km^{2}). The racial makeup of the village was 98.66% White, 0.17% Black or African American, 0.39% Native American, and 0.78% from two or more races. Hispanic or Latino of any race were 0.45% of the population.

There were 724 households, out of which 33.3% had children under the age of 18 living with them, 45.6% were married couples living together, 13.5% had a female householder with no husband present, and 35.4% were non-families. 28.9% of all households were made up of individuals, and 14.1% had someone living alone who was 65 years of age or older. The average household size was 2.48 and the average family size was 3.02.

In the village, the population was spread out, with 27.4% under the age of 18, 8.8% from 18 to 24, 26.9% from 25 to 44, 21.9% from 45 to 64, and 14.9% who were 65 years of age or older. The median age was 36 years. For every 100 females, there were 88.8 males. For every 100 females age 18 and over, there were 87.6 males.

The median income for a household in the village was $31,532, and the median income for a family was $37,708. Males had a median income of $30,313 versus $21,053 for females. The per capita income for the village was $15,215. About 14.0% of families and 17.5% of the population were below the poverty line, including 23.8% of those under age 18 and 9.2% of those age 65 or over.
