= Pinnacle State Park and Golf Course =

Defunct state park in New York, United States

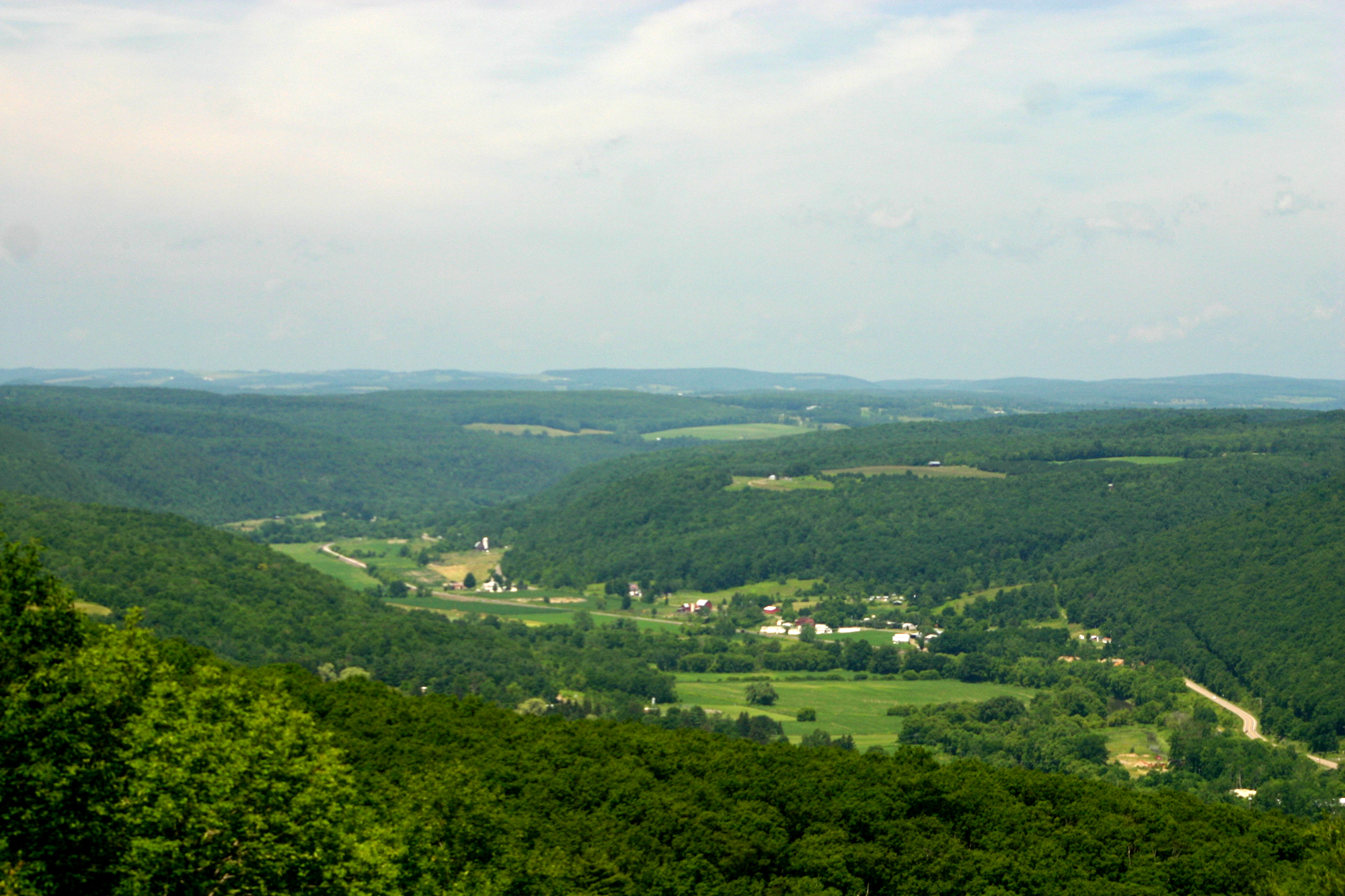
- View of the Canisteo River Valley from Pinnacle State Park

- Location within New York
- Type: State park
- Location: 1904 Pinnacle Road; Addison, New York, U.S.
- Coordinates: 42°05′42″N 77°12′54″W
- Area: 714 acres (2.89 km^{2})
- Operator: New York State Office of Parks, Recreation and Historic Preservation
- Visitors: 6,055 (in 2014)
- Open: All year
- Website: Pinnacle State Park and Golf Course State Park

Pinnacle State Park and Golf Course was a 714-acre (2.89 km^{2}) state park located in Steuben County, New York. The park's site is southwest of the City of Corning in the Town of Addison, east of the Village of Addison.

== Park description ==
Pinnacle State Park offered fishing, hiking on 11 miles (18 km) of trails, hunting of deer, turkey, and small game, and cross-country skiing. A 9-hole golf course with picnic tables, pavilions, and a club house operated in the park until its closure in 2017.

The first section of the Great Eastern Trail in New York was marked at Pinnacle State Park in 2008. After the closing of the park's golf course, it was removed from the list of New York State Parks and merged into the McCarthy Hill State Forest, which is managed by the New York State Department of Environmental Conservation.

== See also ==
- List of New York state parks
