= Coudersport Historic District =

Historic district in Pennsylvania, United States

- U.S. National Register of Historic Places
- U.S. Historic district
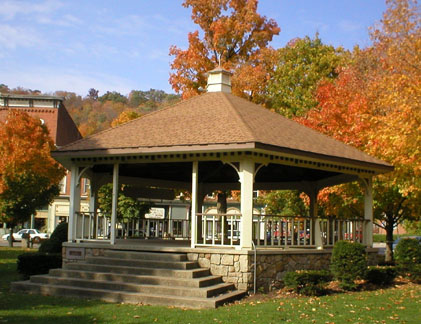
- A gazebo in Coudersport

- Location within Pennsylvania Location within the United States
- Location: Roughly bounded by Seventh, East, Water and Main Sts., Coudersport, Pennsylvania
- Coordinates: 41°46′32″N 78°1′22″W
- Architect: Multiple
- Architectural style: Late 19th And 20th Century Revivals, Late Victorian, Queen Anne
- NRHP reference No.: 85000997
- Added to NRHP: May 09, 1985

The Coudersport Historic District is a historic district in Coudersport, the county seat of Potter County, Pennsylvania in the United States. The district encompasses 73 contributing buildings. Coudersport is in a narrow valley on the Allegheny River and was a boom town when the lumber industry cut the white pine and hemlock forests in the county. Much of the borough's Victorian era architecture stems from this time, and when the lumber was exhausted by the early 20th century, the borough declined in population and economically, preserving many of the historic structures. The district is centered on the Courthouse Square and notable buildings include the Park United Methodist Church (1893), Presbyterian Church (1902), Episcopal Church (1883), Old Hickory Tavern, and Coudersport Consistory complex.

The Coudersport Historic District was added to the National Register of Historic Places on May 9, 1985. The Potter County Courthouse added to the National Register of Historic Places on February 24, 1975, is within the district.

== Gallery ==
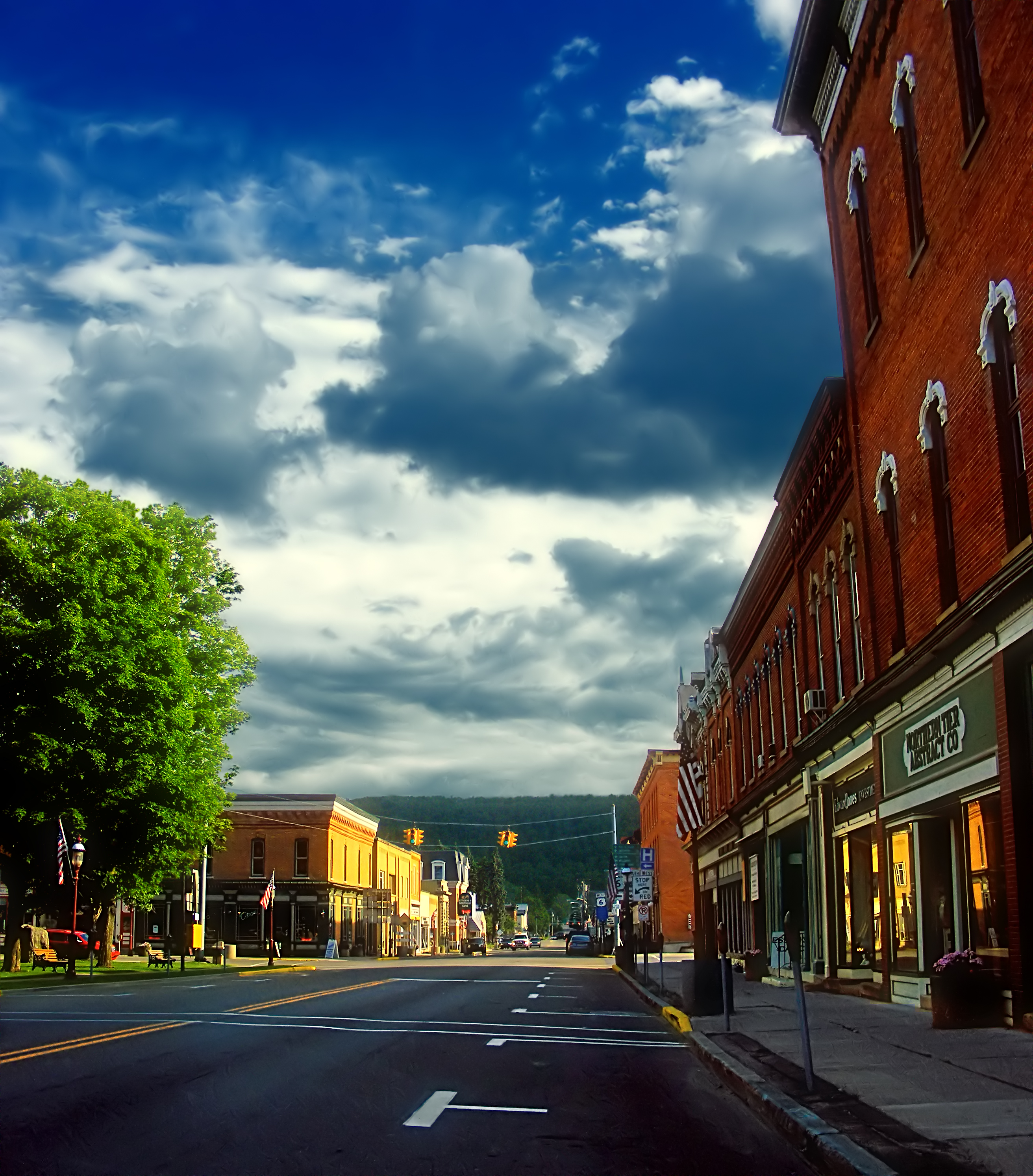
North Main Street, across from the courthouse, 2010

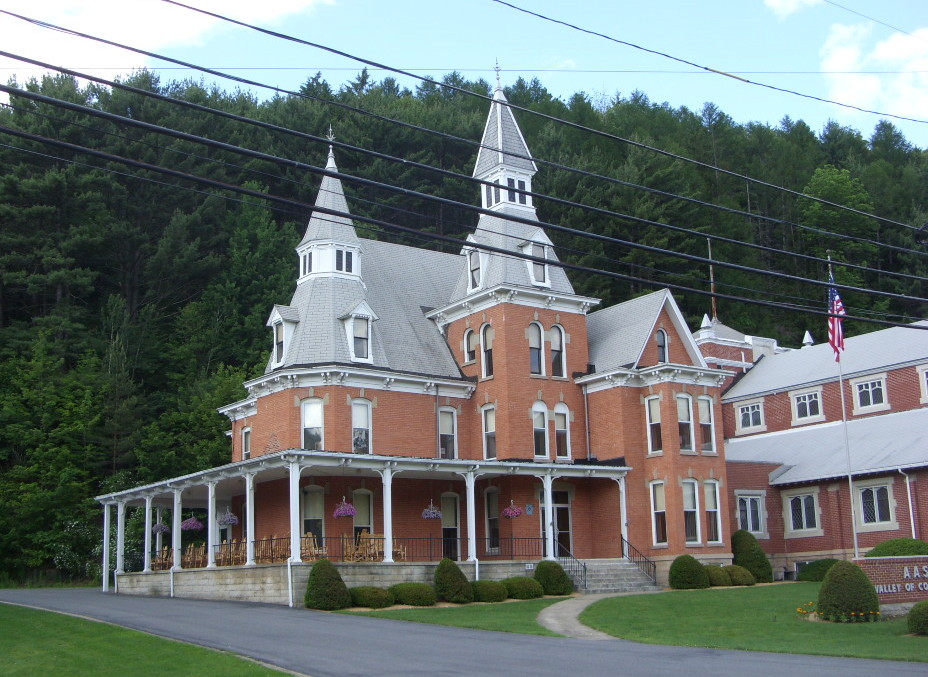
Isaac Benson House, Coudersport Consistory, June 2009

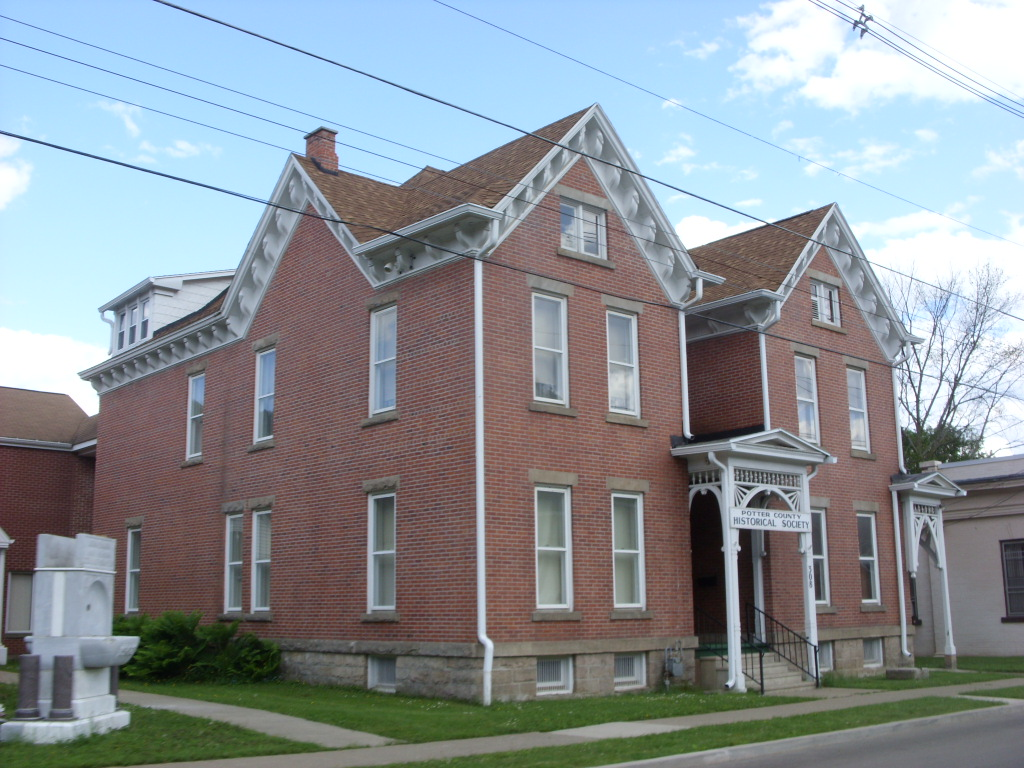
Potter County Historical Society, June 2009

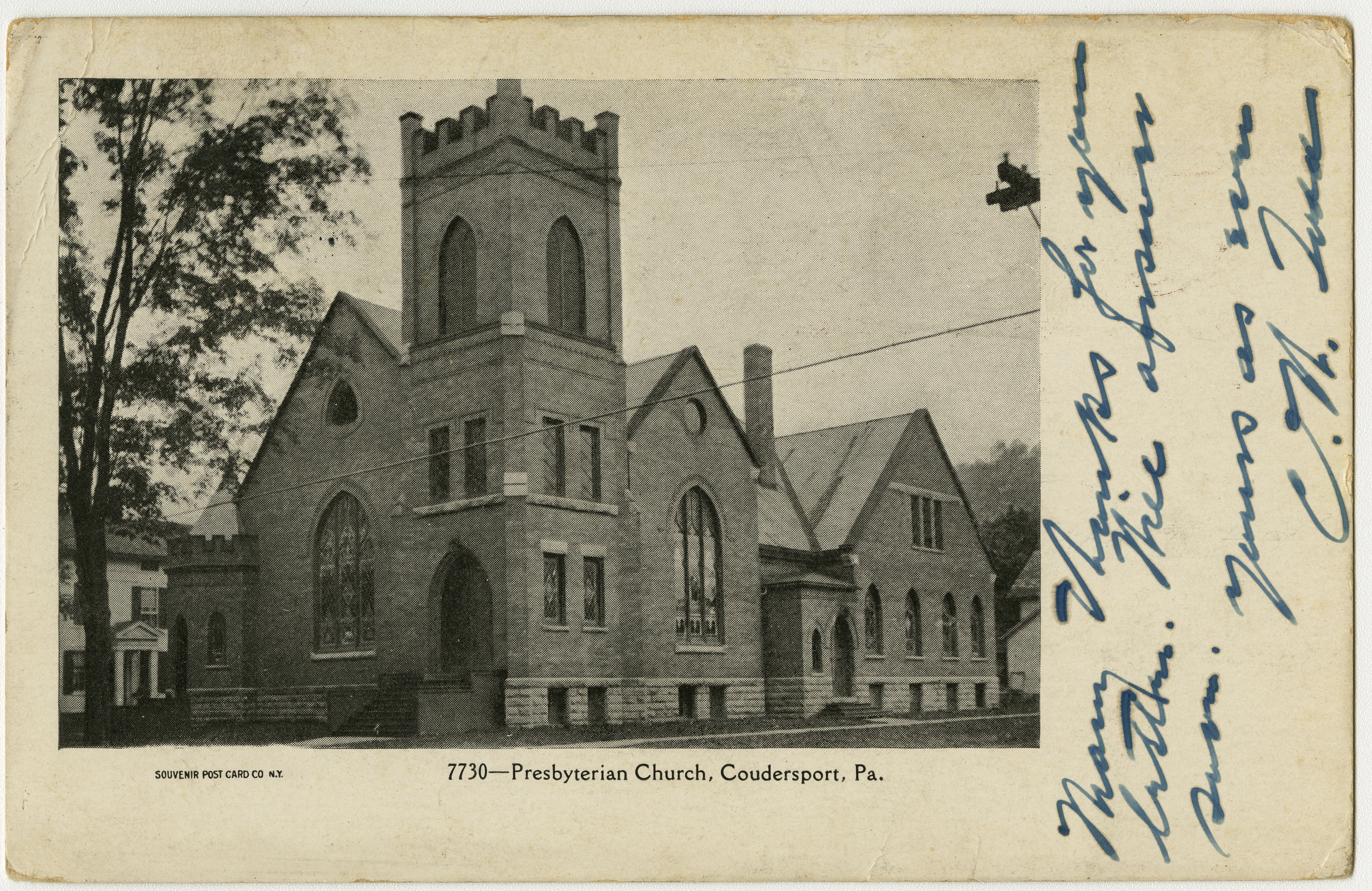
Presbyterian Church c. 1910
