= Potter County Courthouse (Pennsylvania) =

- U.S. National Register of Historic Places
- U.S. Historic district – Contributing property
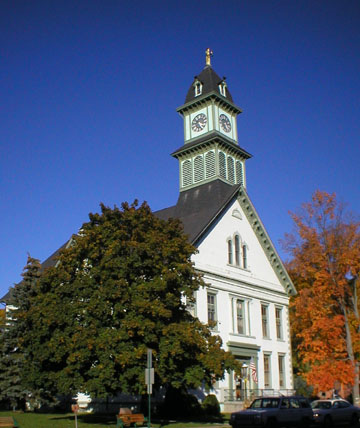

- Location within Pennsylvania
- Interactive map showing the location of Potter County Courthouse
- Location: East 2nd Street, Coudersport, Pennsylvania
- Coordinates: 41°46′28″N 78°1′14″W
- Built: 1851
- Architect: William Bell
- Architectural style: Greek Revival
- Part of: Coudersport Historic District (ID85000997)
- NRHP reference No.: 75001664

Significant dates
- Added to NRHP: February 24, 1975
- Designated CP: May 9, 1985

The Potter County Courthouse is the primary government building of Potter County, Pennsylvania, United States. Located in the Coudersport Historic District in the Potter county seat of Coudersport, it was added the National Register of Historic Places on February 24, 1975. The courthouse is a Greek Revival structure with some Victorian elements blended into it.

== History ==
The Potter County Courthouse was designed by William Bell of Warren County, with the construction beginning in 1851 and being completed in 1853. In 1888, the roof of the courthouse was altered, leading to controversy over the "squandering" of tax money on a relatively new courthouse. The courthouse was renovated by the Civil Works Administration in the winter of 1933–34.

== See also ==
- List of state and county courthouses in Pennsylvania
