= Austin Dam =

Austin Dam may refer to:

- Austin Dam (Pennsylvania) (1909-1911), a failed dam in Austin, Pennsylvania
- Austin Dam (Texas) (1890-1910), a failed dam in Austin, Texas
