= Addison, New York =

Addison
- Town
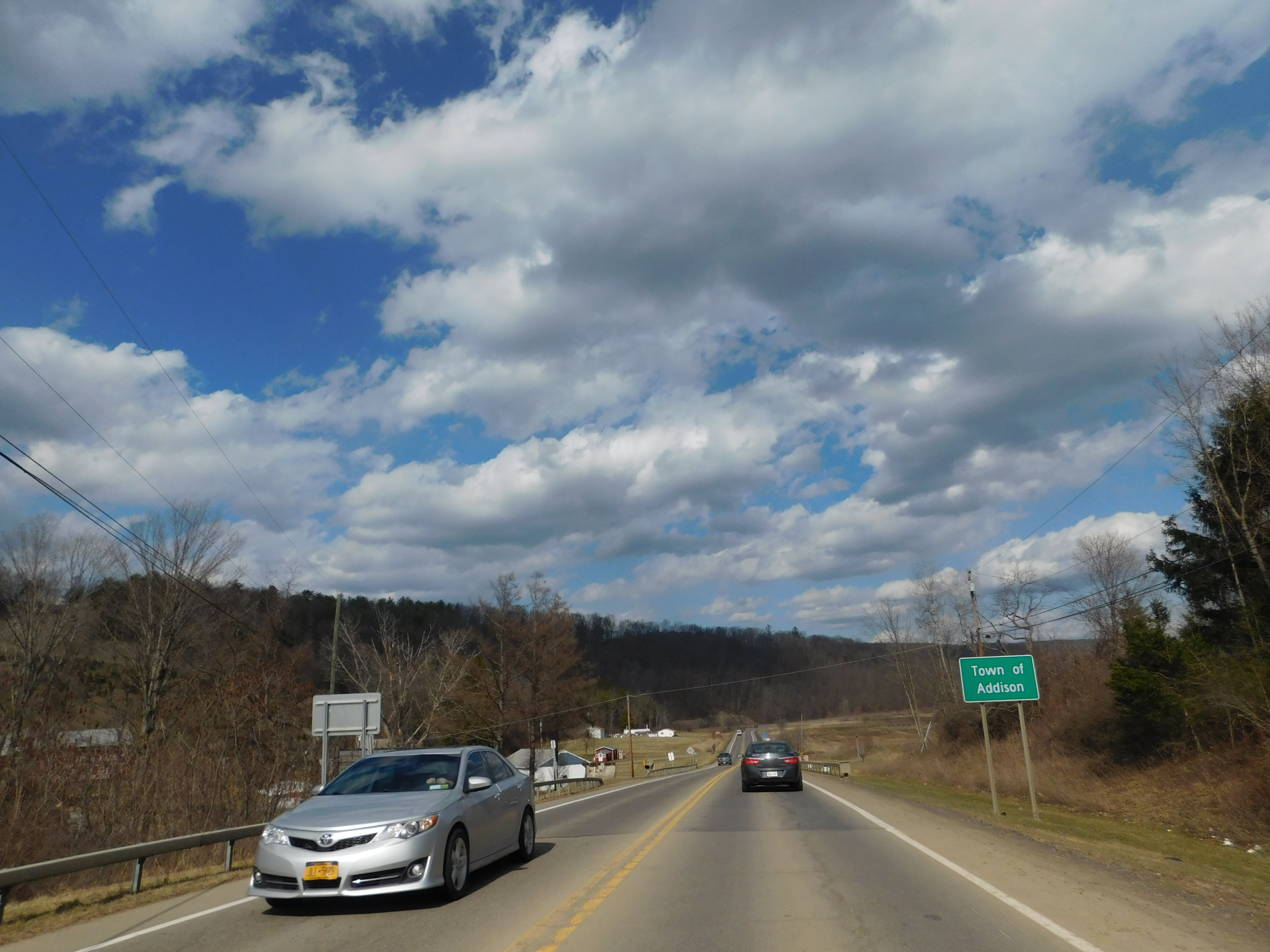
- NY 417 eastbound entering the town of Addison.

- Location within New York
- Coordinates: 42°06′14″N 77°14′02″W
- Country: United States
- State: New York
- County: Steuben County
- Incorporated: 1796

Area
  - Total: 25.69 sq mi (66.53 km^{2})
  - Land: 25.54 sq mi (66.16 km^{2})
  - Water: 0.14 sq mi (0.37 km^{2})
- Elevation: 998 ft (304 m)

Population (2020)
  - Total: 2,397 ▼
  - Estimate (2021): 2,369
  - Density: 99.0/sq mi (38.24/km^{2})
- Time zone: UTC-5 (EST)
  - Summer (DST): UTC-4 (EDT)
- ZIP code: 14801
- Area code: 607
- FIPS code: 36-101-00287
- Website: Town of Addison

Addison is a town in Steuben County, New York. The population was 2,397 at the 2020 census. The name was selected to honor the author Joseph Addison. An interior town in the southeastern part of the county, the town includes a village, also called Addison.

== History ==
The town was first settled in 1791 by Samuel Rice. Originally a part of the old town of Painted Post, Addison was organized as Middletown at the time of Steuben County's creation in March 1796. The name was changed to Addison to honor of Joseph Addison, the English author, on April 6, 1808. The early settlers called it also Tuscarora. Addison Academy opened in 1840. In 1890, the town's population was 2,884.

== Geography ==
According to the U.S. Census Bureau, the town has a total area of 25.7 square miles (66.5 km^{2}), of which 25.6 square miles (66.4 km^{2}) is land and 0.04 square mile (0.1 km^{2}) (0.16%) is water.

Former NY Route 432, now County Road 119, is an east-west highway through the town. NY Route 417, formerly NY Route 17, passes through the town's southeast corner.

Addison is on the Southern Tier Main Line of the Norfolk Southern Railway, the ultimate successor to the Erie/Erie Lackawanna Railroads, which ran it from its opening in 1850 to 1976. From c. 1885 to 1961, Addison was also the northern terminus of the Wellsville, Addison & Galeton Railroad, Baltimore & Ohio, and Buffalo & Susquehanna lines from Galeton, Pennsylvania.

The Canisteo River flows through the southern part of the town. Goodhue Creek flows into the river near the eastern town boundary.

== Demographics ==
Historical population
Census	Pop.	Note	%±
1820	652		—
1830	944		44.8%
1840	1,920		103.4%
1850	3,721		93.8%
1860	1,715		−53.9%
1870	2,218		29.3%
1880	2,534		14.2%
1890	2,908		14.8%
1900	2,637		−9.3%
1910	2,509		−4.9%
1920	2,122		−15.4%
1930	1,975		−6.9%
1940	2,032		2.9%
1950	2,368		16.5%
1960	2,645		11.7%
1970	2,698		2.0%
1980	2,734		1.3%
1990	2,645		−3.3%
2000	2,640		−0.2%
2010	2,595		−1.7%
2020	2,397		−7.6%
2021 (est.)	2,369	▼	−1.2%
U.S. Decennial Census

As of the 2000 census, of 2000, there were 2,640 people, 1,026 households, and 687 families residing in the town. The population density was 103.0 inhabitants per square mile (39.8/km^{2}). There were 1,177 housing units at an average density of 45.9 per square mile (17.7/km^{2}). The racial makeup of the town was 98.45% White, 0.30% Black or African American, 0.34% Native American, 0.04% Asian, 0.08% from other races, and 0.80% from two or more races. Hispanic or Latino of any race were 0.61% of the population.

There were 1,026 households, out of which 34.1% had children under the age of 18 living with them, 48.4% were married couples living together, 12.5% had a female householder with no husband present, and 33.0% were non-families. 25.7% of all households were made up of individuals, and 12.1% had someone living alone who was 65 years of age or older. The average household size was 2.57 and the average family size was 3.06.

In the town, the population was spread out, with 27.1% under the age of 18, 8.9% from 18 to 24, 26.7% from 25 to 44, 23.9% from 45 to 64, and 13.3% who were 65 years of age or older. The median age was 36 years. For every 100 females, there were 92.3 males. For every 100 females age 18 and over, there were 90.9 males.

The median income for a household in the town was $31,942, and the median income for a family was $37,813. Males had a median income of $32,159 versus $22,708 for females. The per capita income for the town was $15,473. About 13.2% of families and 17.7% of the population were below the poverty line, including 23.1% of those under age 18 and 9.7% of those age 65 or over.

== Communities and locations in the Town of Addison ==
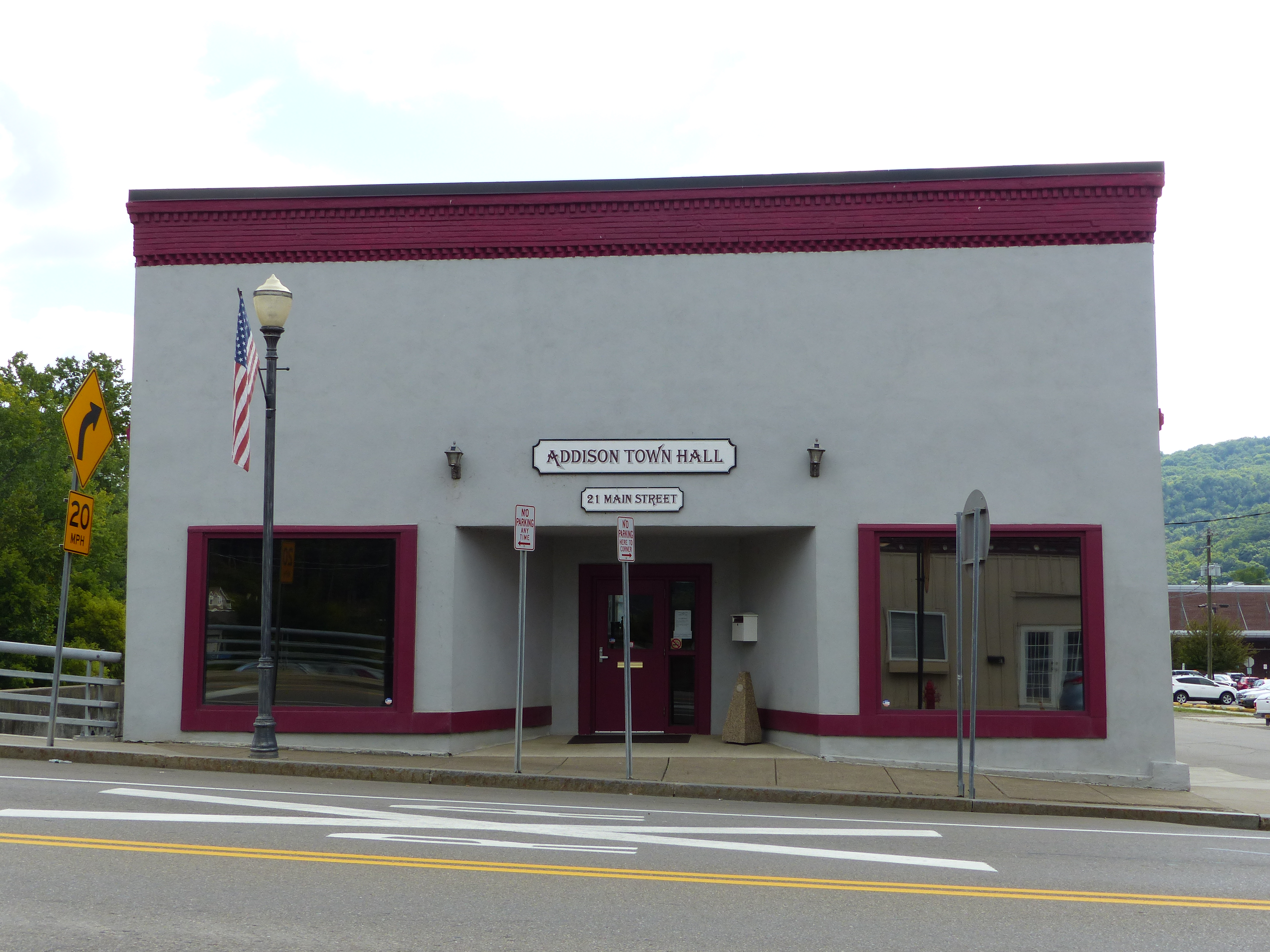
Town hall

- Addison – The Village of Addison is on Route 417.
- Goodhue Lake – A small lake at the northern town line.
- Jones Corners – A location on the western town line and County Road 2.
- America - A 600 acre plot of land; home to the annual AmericaFest.
- Pinnacle State Park – A state park east of Addison village.

== Notable people ==
- Charles W. Gillet, former United States Congressman
- Jim Greengrass, former MLB player
- Bud Heine, former MLB player
- John V. McDuffie, (1841–1896), born in Addison, United States Congressman from Alabama.
- Levi E. Pond, (1833-1895), farmer and Wisconsin state senator, was born in Addison.
- Jennie Phelps Purvis (d. 1924), writer, suffragist, social reformer

== Climate ==
Climate data for the village of Addison, New York, 1991–2020 normals, extremes 1893–2020
Month	Jan	Feb	Mar	Apr	May	Jun	Jul	Aug	Sep	Oct	Nov	Dec	Year
Record high °F (°C)	74 (23)	73 (23)	85 (29)	92 (33)	98 (37)	100 (38)	106 (41)	103 (39)	103 (39)	99 (37)	84 (29)	71 (22)	106 (41)
Mean daily maximum °F (°C)	33.1 (0.6)	35.8 (2.1)	44.0 (6.7)	57.5 (14.2)	69.6 (20.9)	77.9 (25.5)	82.0 (27.8)	80.8 (27.1)	73.7 (23.2)	61.5 (16.4)	48.7 (9.3)	38.0 (3.3)	58.6 (14.8)
Daily mean °F (°C)	23.5 (−4.7)	25.0 (−3.9)	32.5 (0.3)	44.3 (6.8)	55.5 (13.1)	64.6 (18.1)	69.1 (20.6)	67.8 (19.9)	60.5 (15.8)	49.2 (9.6)	38.2 (3.4)	29.5 (−1.4)	46.6 (8.1)
Mean daily minimum °F (°C)	13.8 (−10.1)	14.1 (−9.9)	21.1 (−6.1)	31.1 (−0.5)	41.3 (5.2)	51.3 (10.7)	56.2 (13.4)	54.8 (12.7)	47.4 (8.6)	37.0 (2.8)	27.6 (−2.4)	21.0 (−6.1)	34.7 (1.5)
Record low °F (°C)	−35 (−37)	−28 (−33)	−22 (−30)	1 (−17)	18 (−8)	16 (−9)	34 (1)	34 (1)	24 (−4)	10 (−12)	−4 (−20)	−26 (−32)	−35 (−37)
Average precipitation inches (mm)	1.80 (46)	1.61 (41)	2.52 (64)	3.34 (85)	3.55 (90)	3.19 (81)	4.22 (107)	3.55 (90)	3.66 (93)	3.81 (97)	2.54 (65)	2.26 (57)	36.05 (916)
Average snowfall inches (cm)	13.3 (34)	11.8 (30)	9.6 (24)	1.0 (2.5)	0.1 (0.25)	0.0 (0.0)	0.0 (0.0)	0.0 (0.0)	0.0 (0.0)	0.3 (0.76)	2.1 (5.3)	10.0 (25)	48.2 (121.81)
Average precipitation days (≥ 0.01 in)	13.7	10.9	13.8	14.4	15.3	13.9	11.7	11.9	11.4	15.1	13.6	14.9	160.6
Average snowy days (≥ 0.1 in)	10.0	8.0	5.8	1.0	0.1	0.0	0.0	0.0	0.0	0.1	2.4	8.0	35.4
Source 1: NOAA
Source 2: National Weather Service
