= Coudersport, Pennsylvania =

Borough in Pennsylvania, US

- Borough
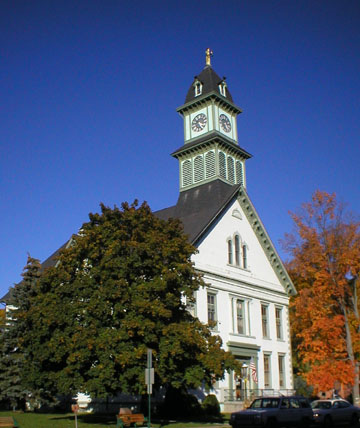
- The Potter County Courthouse

- Seal
- Nicknames: Gods Country; Coudy
- Location of Coudersport in Potter County, Pennsylvania.

- Location within the U.S. state of Pennsylvania Coudersport (the United States)
- Coordinates: 41°46′26″N 78°01′07″W
- Country: United States
- State: Pennsylvania
- County: Potter
- Settled: 1807
- Incorporated (borough): 1848

Government
  - Mayor: Michael Walker
  - Regent: Robert Rossman
  - Duke: Logan Rogers
  - Earl: Brynen Kisiel

Area
  - Total: 5.63 sq mi (14.59 km^{2})
  - Land: 5.63 sq mi (14.59 km^{2})
  - Water: 0 sq mi (0.00 km^{2})
- Elevation (borough benchmark): 1,655 ft (504 m)
- Highest elevation (mountain south of Coudersport downtown): 2,400 ft (730 m)
- Lowest elevation (Allegheny River): 1,620 ft (490 m)

Population (2020)
  - Total: 2,381
  - Density: 422.6/sq mi (163.18/km^{2})
- Time zone: UTC−5 (Eastern (EST))
  - Summer (DST): UTC−4 (EDT)
- ZIP Code: 16915
- Area code: 814
- FIPS code: 42-16448
- GNIS feature ID: 1172494
- Website: coudersportborough.org

Coudersport is a borough in and the county seat of Potter County, Pennsylvania. It is located approximately 110 miles (180 km) east by southeast of Erie on the Allegheny River. The population was 2,371 at the 2020 census.

== Geography ==
Coudersport is located at 41°46′26″N 78°1′7″W (41.773903, -78.018559).

According to the U.S. Census Bureau, the borough has a total area of 5.7 square miles (15 km^{2}), all land.

Coudersport lies in a broad valley at the confluence of the Allegheny River and Mill Creek. It is surrounded by the great hilltop plateaux of the Allegheny highlands. Highways enter north and south on Pennsylvania Route 44, the very old Jersey Shore (log road) Turnpike, and from west to east on U.S. Route 6, the "Grand Army of the Republic Highway", which had been long a major mid-east-states east–west corridor before the construction of Interstate highways which began in the late 1950s. The most noted hilltops, located here on this plateau, are Dutch Hill, stretching to the southeast, and Vader Hill, stretching to the southwest. The Allegheny River makes a quick turn at this point, going from north to west; for that reason, these features are distinctly individual from afar in the broad turning valley, and rise 2400–2500 feet above sea-level.

== History ==
The Coudersport and Port Allegany Railroad Station, Coudersport Historic District, and Potter County Courthouse are listed on the National Register of Historic Places.

== Climate ==
Climate data for Coudersport, PA (COUDERSPORT 1 SW, PA) 1991-2020 normals (Records 2000–2021)
Month	Jan	Feb	Mar	Apr	May	Jun	Jul	Aug	Sep	Oct	Nov	Dec	Year
Record high °F (°C)	64 (18)	74 (23)	78 (26)	88 (31)	93 (34)	90 (32)	101 (38)	92 (33)	93 (34)	85 (29)	76 (24)	67 (19)	101 (38)
Mean daily maximum °F (°C)	30.7 (−0.7)	34.1 (1.2)	43.4 (6.3)	57.1 (13.9)	68.3 (20.2)	75.7 (24.3)	79.6 (26.4)	77.9 (25.5)	71.0 (21.7)	59.1 (15.1)	46.4 (8.0)	35.4 (1.9)	56.6 (13.7)
Daily mean °F (°C)	21.9 (−5.6)	23.6 (−4.7)	31.8 (−0.1)	43.7 (6.5)	54.8 (12.7)	62.7 (17.1)	66.7 (19.3)	65.4 (18.6)	58.8 (14.9)	47.5 (8.6)	36.5 (2.5)	27.6 (−2.4)	45.1 (7.3)
Mean daily minimum °F (°C)	13.2 (−10.4)	13.1 (−10.5)	20.3 (−6.5)	30.4 (−0.9)	41.2 (5.1)	49.6 (9.8)	53.8 (12.1)	53.0 (11.7)	46.6 (8.1)	35.8 (2.1)	26.6 (−3.0)	19.9 (−6.7)	33.6 (0.9)
Record low °F (°C)	−22 (−30)	−25 (−32)	−20 (−29)	11 (−12)	20 (−7)	24 (−4)	34 (1)	34 (1)	31 (−1)	9 (−13)	−1 (−18)	−11 (−24)	−25 (−32)
Average precipitation inches (mm)	2.92 (74)	2.39 (61)	3.21 (82)	3.73 (95)	3.78 (96)	4.15 (105)	4.74 (120)	4.07 (103)	4.15 (105)	3.96 (101)	3.51 (89)	3.37 (86)	43.98 (1,117)
Average snowfall inches (cm)	18.4 (47)	20.0 (51)	9.2 (23)	3.3 (8.4)	0.1 (0.25)	0.0 (0.0)	0.0 (0.0)	0.0 (0.0)	0.0 (0.0)	0.7 (1.8)	4.8 (12)	15.3 (39)	71.8 (182)
Average precipitation days (≥ 0.01 in)	15.5	13.1	13.7	13.4	15.7	15.4	12.5	12.1	12.2	16.0	13.6	15.2	168.4
Average snowy days (≥ 0.1 in)	10.9	9.8	5.9	2.5	0.1	0.0	0.0	0.0	0.0	0.5	3.3	7.7	40.7
Source: NOAA

Climate data for Coudersport, Pennsylvania 1991–2020 normals (Records 2005–2021)
Month	Jan	Feb	Mar	Apr	May	Jun	Jul	Aug	Sep	Oct	Nov	Dec	Year
Record high °F (°C)	62 (17)	71 (22)	75 (24)	85 (29)	88 (31)	87 (31)	98 (37)	88 (31)	89 (32)	82 (28)	73 (23)	65 (18)	98 (37)
Mean daily maximum °F (°C)	29.9 (−1.2)	32.5 (0.3)	41.2 (5.1)	55.0 (12.8)	66.3 (19.1)	73.7 (23.2)	77.9 (25.5)	76.2 (24.6)	69.6 (20.9)	57.7 (14.3)	45.0 (7.2)	34.4 (1.3)	55.0 (12.8)
Daily mean °F (°C)	21.9 (−5.6)	23.6 (−4.7)	31.4 (−0.3)	43.6 (6.4)	54.5 (12.5)	62.5 (16.9)	66.3 (19.1)	65.0 (18.3)	58.6 (14.8)	47.4 (8.6)	36.7 (2.6)	27.3 (−2.6)	44.9 (7.2)
Mean daily minimum °F (°C)	13.8 (−10.1)	14.6 (−9.7)	21.6 (−5.8)	32.1 (0.1)	42.6 (5.9)	51.2 (10.7)	54.7 (12.6)	53.8 (12.1)	47.6 (8.7)	37.2 (2.9)	28.5 (−1.9)	20.1 (−6.6)	34.8 (1.6)
Record low °F (°C)	−16 (−27)	−20 (−29)	−12 (−24)	10 (−12)	22 (−6)	30 (−1)	36 (2)	37 (3)	26 (−3)	19 (−7)	0 (−18)	−7 (−22)	−20 (−29)
Average precipitation inches (mm)	3.41 (87)	2.56 (65)	3.35 (85)	3.92 (100)	4.12 (105)	4.38 (111)	4.99 (127)	4.27 (108)	4.36 (111)	4.46 (113)	3.42 (87)	3.49 (89)	46.73 (1,187)
Average snowfall inches (cm)	18.3 (46)	20.4 (52)	10.1 (26)	4.9 (12)	0.1 (0.25)	0.0 (0.0)	0.0 (0.0)	0.0 (0.0)	0.0 (0.0)	1.2 (3.0)	5.5 (14)	17.5 (44)	78.0 (198)
Average precipitation days (≥ 0.01 in)	15.9	14.6	14.6	14.8	15.2	14.2	13.0	11.6	11.4	15.7	13.9	17.0	171.9
Average snowy days (≥ 0.1 in)	11.3	11.1	6.6	2.9	0.2	0.0	0.0	0.0	0.0	0.8	4.4	9.9	47.2
Source: NOAA

== Demographics ==
Historical population
Census	Pop.	Note	%±
1850	234		—
1860	446		90.6%
1870	471		5.6%
1880	677		43.7%
1890	1,530		126.0%
1900	3,217		110.3%
1910	3,100		−3.6%
1920	2,836		−8.5%
1930	2,740		−3.4%
1940	3,197		16.7%
1950	3,210		0.4%
1960	2,889		−10.0%
1970	2,831		−2.0%
1980	2,791		−1.4%
1990	2,854		2.3%
2000	2,650		−7.1%
2010	2,546		−3.9%
2020	2,381		−6.5%
2021 (est.)	2,351	▼	−1.3%

As of the census of 2000, there were 2,650 people, 1,101 households, and 700 families residing in the borough. The population density was 467.2 inhabitants per square mile (180.4/km^{2}). There were 1,189 housing units at an average density of 209.6 per square mile (80.9/km^{2}). The racial makeup of the borough was 97.02% White, 0.49% African American, 0.08% Native American, 1.62% Asian, 0.19% from other races, and 0.60% from two or more races. Hispanic or Latino of any race were 0.49% of the population.

There were 1,101 households, out of which 30.1% had children under the age of 18 living with them, 50.8% were married couples living together, 9.3% had a female householder with no husband present, and 36.4% were non-families. 32.0% of all households were made up of individuals, and 13.1% had someone living alone who was 65 years of age or older. The average household size was 2.35 and the average family size was 3.00.

In the borough, the population was spread out, with 25.3% under the age of 18, 7.1% from 18 to 24, 27.5% from 25 to 44, 22.8% from 45 to 64, and 17.2% who were 65 years of age or older. The median age was 38 years. For every 100 females there were 94.1 males. For every 100 females age 18 and over, there were 89.7 males.

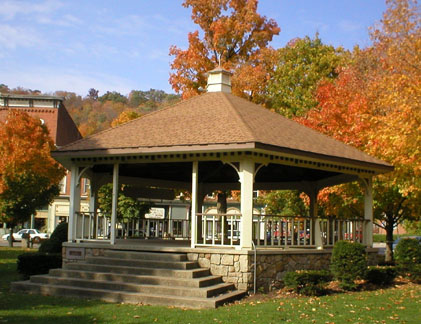
Gazebo in Town Square behind Potter County Courthouse in Coudersport

The median income for a household in the borough was $35,813, and the median income for a family was $44,053. Males had a median income of $32,288 versus $22,439 for females. The per capita income for the borough was $18,209. About 6.9% of families and 11.0% of the population were below the poverty line, including 12.6% of those under age 18 and 12.1% of those age 65 or over.

== Fracking controversy ==
In early 2018, the Coudersport Area Municipal Authority (CAMA) became involved in a controversial proposal for a fracking wastewater plant near Coudersport. JKLM Energy proposes trucking "produced water" (fracking wastewater) to a centralized plant for treatment to be located adjacent to the CAMA plant in Eulalia Township when and if the plant is approved and licensed by governmental authorities. The treated wastewater would then be transferred to CAMA for disposal into the headwaters of the Allegheny River.

The entire proposal is opposed by many residents of the borough and the county, as well as by the Seneca Nation of Indians who reside downriver from the proposed plant location.

The Pennsylvania Department of Environmental Protection fined JKLM $472,317 in 2016 for groundwater contamination caused by the use of an unapproved surfactant during the drilling of a natural gas well. The contamination impacted six private drinking water wells in Sweden and Eulalia townships (Potter County).

The Cattaraugus County, New York legislature as well as New York State Senator Catharine Young (R-NY) have joined the Seneca Nation in opposition to the proposed fracking wastewater plant. The Coudersport Borough Council voted to oppose siting the plant near Coudersport. The Coudersport Borough Council's resolution of opposition was forwarded to the Coudersport Area Municipal Authority (CAMA), who has not yet considered it in a public forum.

== Notable people ==
- Ronald C. Brock, adjutant general of New York
- Lafayette Cartee, politician
- Mark Corey, former baseball pitcher for the New York Mets, Colorado Rockies and Pittsburgh Pirates
- John Rigas, Adelphia Communications Corporation Founder
- Josh Kinney, MLB pitcher
- Riki Lindhome, actress
- Eliot Ness, American prohibition agent

== Notable facts ==
Coudersport is home to a Scottish Rite Consistory. With approximately 3000 members, Coudersport's Consistory has the largest per-capita membership of any Scottish Rite Consistory.

The newly re-opened Ice Mine is a popular tourist attraction in Coudersport. The mine freezes with ice in the summer, and the ice melts in the winter.

Coudersport was the home of "Untouchable" Eliot Ness at the time of his death. He was a principal in the Guaranty Paper Corporation, which specialized in watermarking legal & official documents to prevent counterfeiting. The company moved from Cleveland to Coudersport around 1955 because operating costs were lower. Ness, with his wife and son, were living in the Brocklebank home from 1956 to 1957. Ness died there from a heart attack in May 1957.

Located in the northern portion of Coudersport is the Coudersport Area Recreation Park (CARP). This sports and recreation park was established in the 1960s by a group of town leaders including Dr. William L. Mitchell, a local veterinarian. It currently has a football field with track & field capabilities, baseball and softball fields, basketball courts, picnic areas and hiking trails.

According to historical books at the Penn State University Park library, Coudersport derived its name from a Dutchman named Couder who was a primary funder for the surveying of the future town as a "port" on the Allegheny River, thus becoming Couder's Port.

Coudersport was the former headquarters of Adelphia, which at its peak was the 5th largest cable provider in the United States. The company went bankrupt due to internal corruption in 2002, and the headquarters were moved to Colorado a few years later.

The fictional town of Farringdon, depicted in the Judy Bolton detective series by Margaret Sutton, is based on Coudersport, where Sutton grew up and attended school. The school, town hall, and several recognizable residences are described in her books. Judy Bolton Days, an annual festival honoring the books of the late Sutton, is hosted each October by the local Chamber of Commerce.

Radio stations WNG591 (a NOAA Weather Radio outlet programmed out of State College) and WFRM (a locally programmed AM radio station, 600 kHz) are licensed to Coudersport. The former WFRM-FM, 96.7 MHz, was licensed to Coudersport for much of its existence but was later reallocated to Portville, New York. The local newspaper, the Potter Leader-Enterprise, is published out of Coudersport.

Coudersport is located near Cherry Springs State Park, which features some of the darkest skies near the East Coast. This means the town is a prominent destination for stargazers.
