= Major E. Holmes =

American academic and chemical engineer (1882–1946)

- Born: Major Edward Holmes; January 8, 1882; La Grange, Kentucky, U.S.
- Died: May 3, 1946 (aged 64); North Hornell, New York, U.S.
- Occupations: Academic and chemical engineer

Academic background
- Education: Indiana State University, A.B., 1908; Cornell University, MA, 1910 and Ph.D., 1914

Academic work
- Discipline: Chemistry
- Sub-discipline: Physical chemistry and economic geology
- Institutions: Missouri School of Mines; New York State College of Ceramics at Alfred University

Major Edward Holmes (January 8, 1882 – May 3, 1946) was an American academic, chemical engineer, and educator. He was the dean of the New York State College of Ceramics at Alfred University and founder and head of the Department of Ceramic Engineering and the Missouri School of Mines. He also worked for the National Carbon Company, the National Lime Association, and the U.S. Gypsum Company. He worked on developing dry cell batteries and made improvements in quick-setting lime plaster

== Early life ==
Holmes was born on January 8, 1882, in La Grange, Kentucky. His parents were Laura (née Maddox) and Jesse Holmes. They lived in Oldham County, Kentucky until he was thirteen years old. Holmes attended public schools in La Grange and Kempton, Indiana. He graduated from Tipton High School in Tipton, Indiana in 1901. He then attended Valparaiso College.

When he was nineteen years old, Holmes taught high school in New York, Indiana, from 1901 to 1902. He then taught at the Kempton High School in Kempton, Indiana, from 1902 to 1903. Holmes was a principal with the Goldman Indiana Public Schools from 1904 to 1905 and with the Jefferson Turnpike Consolidated Schools in Kempton from 1905 to 1906.

Holmes received an A.B. degree from Indiana State University in 1908. During his senior year at Indiana, he was an instructor at the university. He then attended Cornell University, receiving a Master of Arts degree in physical chemistry and economic geology in 1910 and a Ph.D. in chemistry in 1918. While at Cornell, he joined the New York chapter of Keramos, a professional fraternity in 1933. He was also an instructor at Cornell from 1908 to 1910.

== Career ==
=== Industry ===
Holmes was a registered engineer and worked for the National Carbon Company in Cleveland, Ohio, from 1910 to 1918. During World War I, in 1917 and 1918, he developed dry cell batteries for the United States government. He then worked for the National Lime Association in Washington, D.C. as the manager of its chemistry department from 1920 to 1922 and as its acting general manager from 1922 to 1923.

In 1923, Holmes became the development engineer for the U.S. Gypsum Company in Chicago, Illinois. He took the same position with Dolomite Company, Inc. in Columbus, Ohio, from 1924 to 1926, working on a collaborative effort with the United States Bureau of Mines to develop stabilizing dolomite refractories. He helped make improvements in quick-setting lime plaster.

=== Academia ===
In 1926, Holmes became founder and head of the Department of Ceramic Engineering and the Missouri Clay Testing and Research Laboratories at the Missouri School of Mines in Rolla, Missouri. In July 1932, Holmes became the dean of the New York State College of Ceramics at Alfred University, a position he kept until he died. He founded the New York Ceramic Experiment Station at Alfred University in 1935. He held nine patents and published more than thirty articles in professional bulletins.

Holmes was a fellow and vice president of the American Ceramic Society and also helped establish its Western Division. He co-founded and was president of the Ceramic Education Council. Holmes was the founder and board member of the Ceramics Association of New York from 1933 to 1946. He belonged to the American Society for Testing Materials, the American Chemical Association, the National Institute of Ceramic Engineers, and the American Institute of Chemical Engineers. He belonged to the Alpha Chi Sigma chemistry professional fraternity.

== Honors ==
Holmes belonged to the Sigma Xi honor society. He was a fellow in the American Ceramic Society. The University of Alfred awarded Holmes an honorary Doctor of Science, posthumously, in 1946.

== Personal ==
In 1922, Holmes married Jaunita Garr of La Grange, Kentucky. She assisted Holmes with his work.

He belonged to the Rotary Club, the Masons, and the Klan Alpine local fraternity at Alfred University. He was the national chairman of the Keramos professional fraternity from 1934 to 1936.

Holmes died of a throat infection at Bethesda Hospital in North Hornell, New York, on May 3, 1946. He was buried in Valley of Rest Cemetery in La Grange, Kentucky.
