= Hornellsville =

Hornellsville can refer to:

- The town (township) of Hornellsville, New York
- Until 1906, the city of Hornell, New York was also named Hornellsville.
