= Hartsville, New York =

- Town
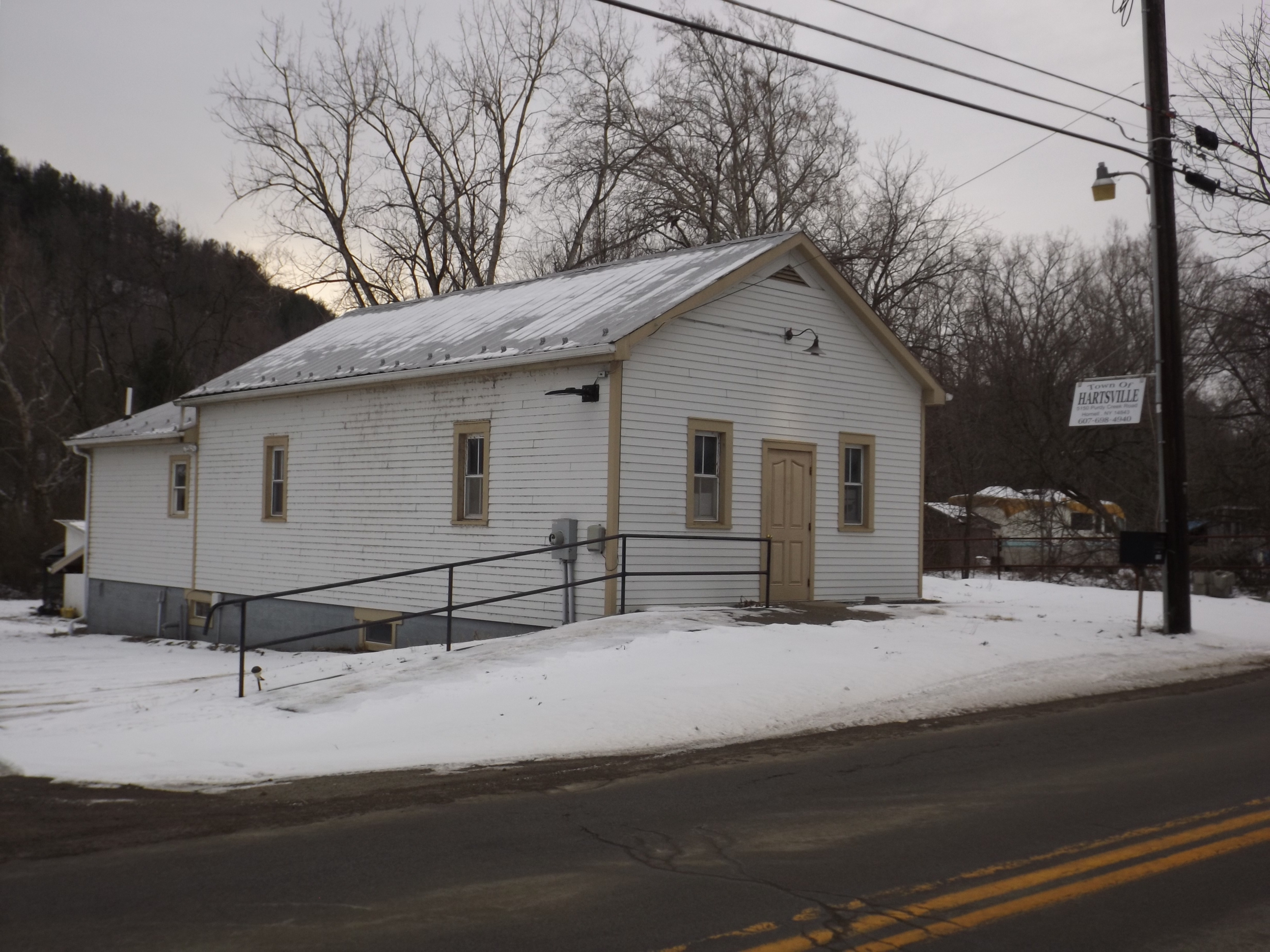
- Town Hall

- Location within the state of New York
- Coordinates: 42°14′50″N 77°41′34″W
- Country: United States
- State: New York
- County: Steuben

Area
  - Total: 36.20 sq mi (93.75 km^{2})
  - Land: 36.14 sq mi (93.61 km^{2})
  - Water: 0.058 sq mi (0.15 km^{2})
- Elevation: 2,116 ft (645 m)

Population (2020)
  - Total: 561 ▼
  - Estimate (2021): 554
  - Density: 16.4/sq mi (6.35/km^{2})
- Time zone: UTC-5 (Eastern (EST))
  - Summer (DST): UTC-4 (EDT)
- FIPS code: 36-32567
- GNIS feature ID: 0979055
- Website: https://www.townofhartsvilleny.gov/

Hartsville is a town in Steuben County, New York, United States. The population was 561 at the 2020 census. The town is named after a prominent early settler, Reuben Hart.

The Town of Hartsville is on the county's western border and is south of Hornell.

== History ==
The first permanent settler arrived circa 1810.

The early lumber industry gradually converted to raising dairy cows as land was cleared.

The town was formed from the Town of Hornellsville in 1844.

== Geography ==
According to the United States Census Bureau, the town has a total area of 36.2 square miles (94 km^{2}), of which 36.2 square miles (94 km^{2}) is land and 0.04 square miles (0.10 km^{2}) (0.06%) is water.

The western town line is the border of Allegany County.

=== Neighboring towns and areas ===
To the west is the Town of Alfred in Allegany County. To the north is the Town of Hornellsville and to the south is the Town of Greenwood. The eastern town line is shared with the Town of Canisteo.

== Demographics ==
Historical population
Census	Pop.	Note	%±
1850	854		—
1860	1,154		35.1%
1870	993		−14.0%
1880	1,015		2.2%
1890	757		−25.4%
1900	787		4.0%
1910	651		−17.3%
1920	545		−16.3%
1930	470		−13.8%
1940	498		6.0%
1950	518		4.0%
1960	479		−7.5%
1970	467		−2.5%
1980	509		9.0%
1990	546		7.3%
2000	585		7.1%
2010	609		4.1%
2020	561		−7.9%
2021 (est.)	554		−1.2%
U.S. Decennial Census

As of the census of 2000, there were 585 people, 233 households, and 170 families residing in the town. The population density was 16.2 inhabitants per square mile (6.3/km^{2}). There were 377 housing units at an average density of 10.4 per square mile (4.0/km^{2}). The racial makeup of the town was 99.49% White, 0.17% Native American, 0.17% from other races, and 0.17% from two or more races. Hispanic or Latino of any race were 0.17% of the population.

There were 233 households, out of which 28.3% had children under the age of 18 living with them, 62.7% were married couples living together, 4.3% had a female householder with no husband present, and 27.0% were non-families. 23.6% of all households were made up of individuals, and 6.4% had someone living alone who was 65 years of age or older. The average household size was 2.51 and the average family size was 2.95.

In the town, the population was spread out, with 24.3% under the age of 18, 6.8% from 18 to 24, 26.2% from 25 to 44, 29.6% from 45 to 64, and 13.2% who were 65 years of age or older. The median age was 40 years. For every 100 females, there were 115.1 males. For every 100 females age 18 and over, there were 116.1 males.

The median income for a household in the town was $40,568, and the median income for a family was $42,656. Males had a median income of $29,375 versus $18,654 for females. The per capita income for the town was $17,667. About 8.3% of families and 12.3% of the population were below the poverty line, including 26.9% of those under age 18 and 4.1% of those age 65 or over.

== Communities and locations in the Town of Hartsville ==
- Hartsville – The hamlet of Hartsville, located on County Road 28 near the center of the town, is the only community in the town. It was also previously known as "Hartsville Center."
- Purdy Creek – A stream flowing through the town and Hartsville village. It was named after an early settler and eventually flows into the Canisteo River.
- Webb Hollow – A valley northwest of Hartsville hamlet.

== See also ==
- Hornell Raceway
