= Zachary Smith =

Zachary Smith (or other forms such as Zac, Zach, Zack) may refer to:

== People ==
=== Arts and entertainment ===
- Armistead Burwell Smith IV, also known as Zach Smith, American rock musician with Three Mile Pilot and Pinback
- Zachary Smith (guitarist), American rock guitarist with The Loud Family, The Flying Monkeys, and Power13
- Zachary Dylan Smith (born 1994), American actor
- Zack Smith, American rock guitarist and songwriter with Scandal
- Zak Smith (born 1976), American artist and alternative porn star
- Zachary Cole Smith (born 1984), American musician, model and music video director

=== Characters ===
- Zac Smith (Shortland Street), a fictional character on the New Zealand soap opera Shortland Street
- Zacharias Smith, a fictional character from the Harry Potter books by J.K. Rowling
- Zachary Smith, a fictional character originated by Jonathan Harris on the TV series Lost in Space

=== Military and industry ===
- Zach "Hoeken" Smith, a co-founder of RepRap and MakerBot
- Zachary D. Smith (1990–2010), a U.S. Marine Lance Corporal killed in Afghanistan, memorialized by Zachary Smith Post Office
- Zachary Smith Reynolds (1911–1932), American amateur aviator and tobacco industry heir

=== Sports ===
- Zac Smith (born 1990), Australian-rules footballer
- Zack Smith (born 1988), Canadian ice hockey player
- Zach Smith (American football) (born 1998), American football quarterback

== Places ==
- Zachary Smith Post Office, in Hornell, New York
