= Adsit House =

Historic house in New York, United States

- U.S. National Register of Historic Places
- Location within New York Location within the United States
- Location: 34 Main St., Hornell, New York
- Coordinates: 42°19′42″N 77°39′49″W
- Area: 0.3 acres (0.12 ha)
- Built: 1828
- Architect: Davenport, Ira
- Architectural style: Federal, Greek Revival, et al.
- NRHP reference No.: 03000047
- Added to NRHP: February 20, 2003

Adsit House was a historic house located at 34 Main Street in Hornell, Steuben County, New York.

== Description and history ==
It was a two-story, L-shaped brick dwelling constructed in stages between 1828 and 1880. The original section constructed in 1828 was a two-story, three-bay brick residence in the Federal style, the first brick structure in Hornell.

It was listed on the National Register of Historic Places on February 20, 2003.

The house was demolished on June 15, 2010. Hornell residents had mixed emotions about the historic house being razed.
