= St. Ann's Federation Building =

Historic commercial building in New York, United States

- U.S. National Register of Historic Places
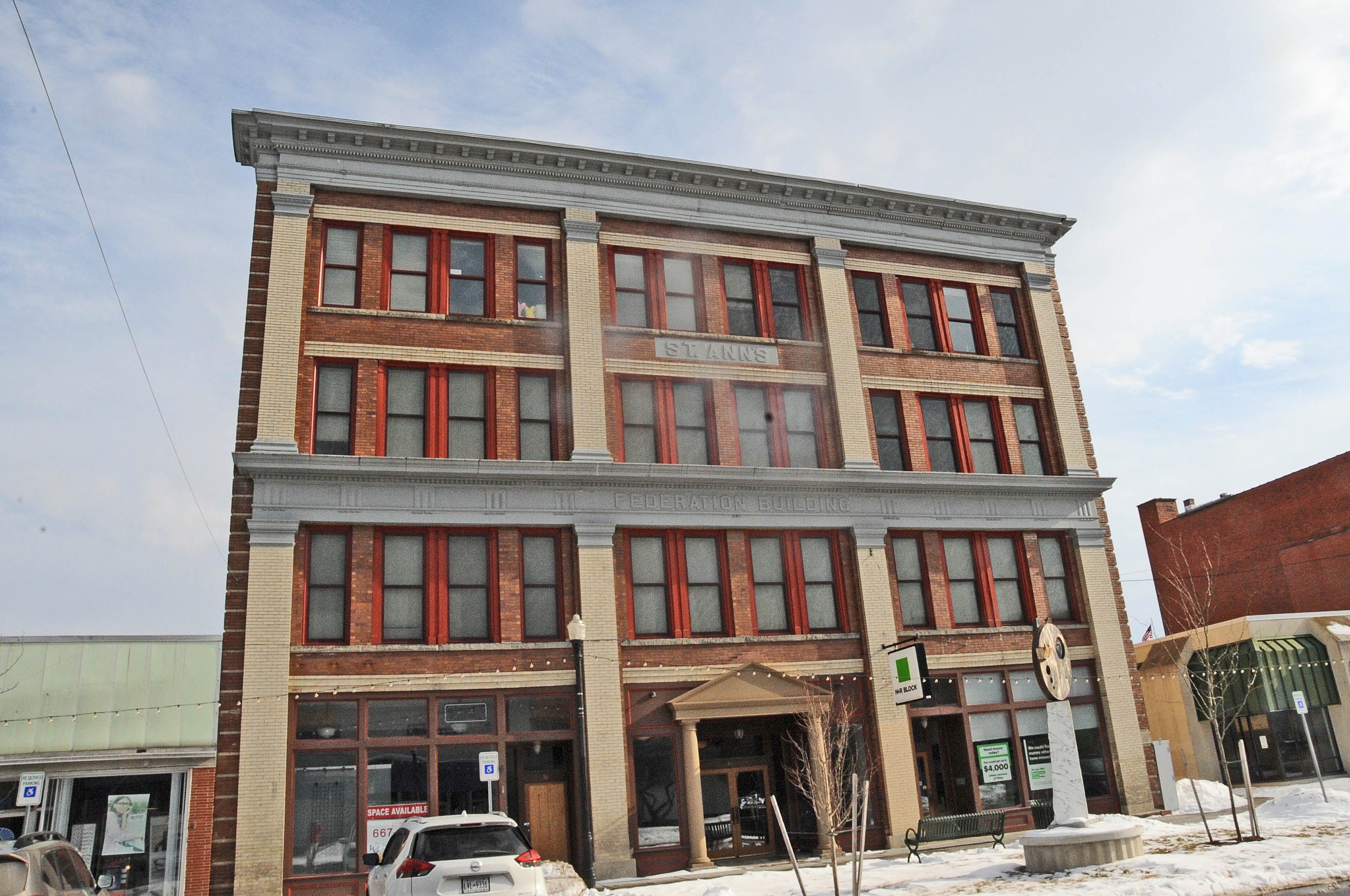

- Location within New York Location within the United States
- Location: 38 Broadway, Hornell, New York
- Coordinates: 42°19′33″N 77°39′38″W
- Area: less than one acre
- Built: 1910
- Built by: John Keenan
- Architect: Otis Dockstader
- Architectural style: Classical Revival
- NRHP reference No.: 01000552
- Added to NRHP: May 29, 2001

St. Ann's Federation Building is a historic commercial and office building located at Hornell in Steuben County, New York. It is a rectangular shaped, four story Neoclassical style building built between 1910 and 1912. The architect was Otis Dockstader of Elmira. The fireproof steel frame is clad in red and yellow brick laid up in running bond above a poured concrete foundation. The first story is composed of plate glass storefronts flanking a central entrance. The second floor contains a two-story, 73 by 60 feet auditorium, and dance hall.

It was listed on the National Register of Historic Places in 2001.
