= Hornell Public Library =

- U.S. National Register of Historic Places
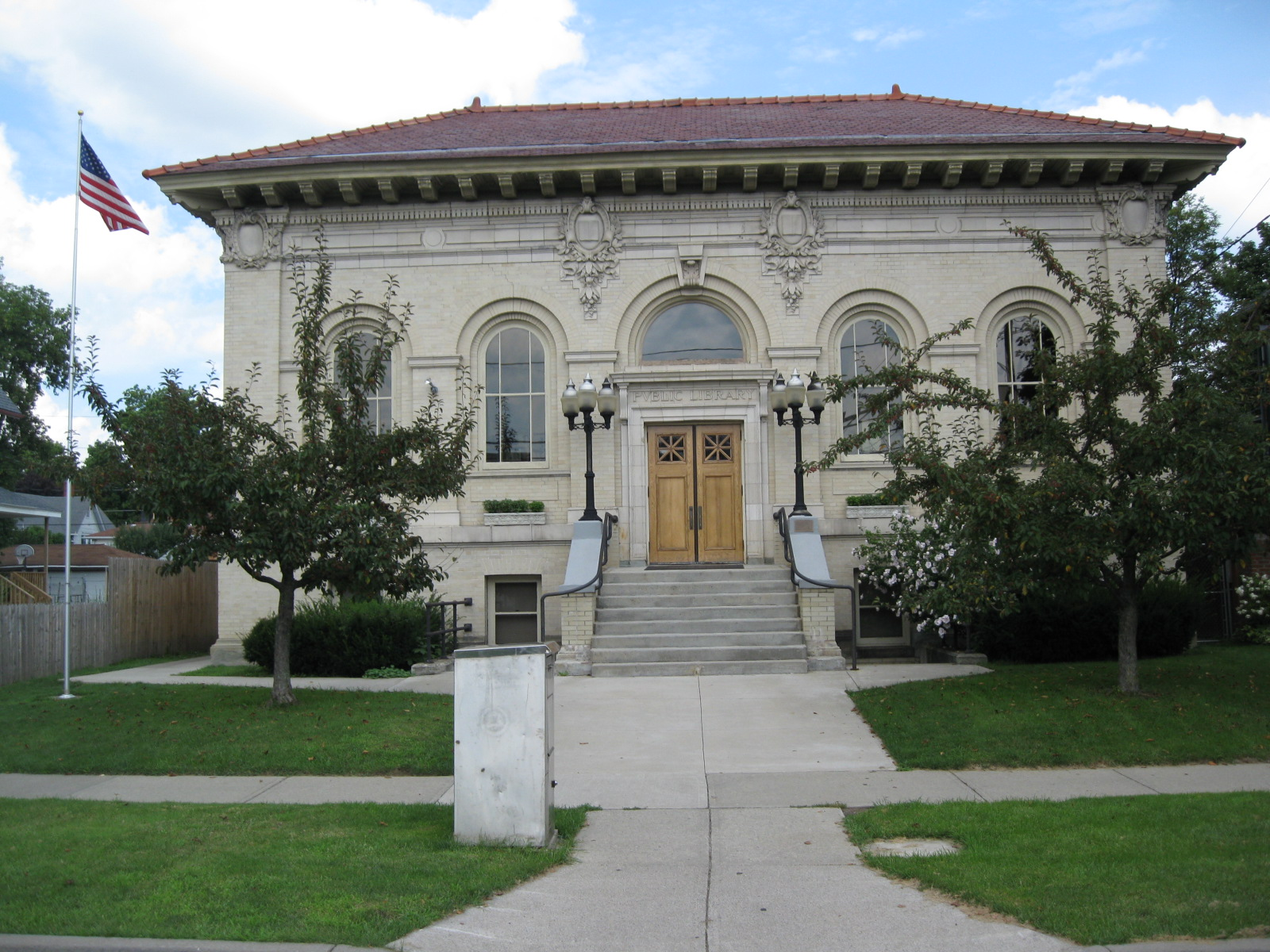
- Hornell Public Library, August 2009

- Location within New York Location within the United States
- Location: 64 Genesee St., Hornell, New York
- Coordinates: 42°19′41″N 77°39′28″W
- Area: less than one acre
- Built: 1908
- Architect: Tilton, Edward L.; Fahy & Prentiss
- Architectural style: Carnegie Library Style
- NRHP reference No.: 75001230
- Added to NRHP: February 24, 1975

Hornell Public Library is a historic library building located at Hornell in Steuben County, New York, USA. It was designed in 1908 and dedicated in 1911, with funds provided by the philanthropist Andrew Carnegie. It is one of 3,000 such libraries constructed between 1885 and 1919. Carnegie provided $25,000 toward the construction of the Hornell library. It is a one-story, five bay structure built of white pressed brick with masonry trim.

It was listed on the National Register of Historic Places in 1975.
