= Arkport, New York =

- Village
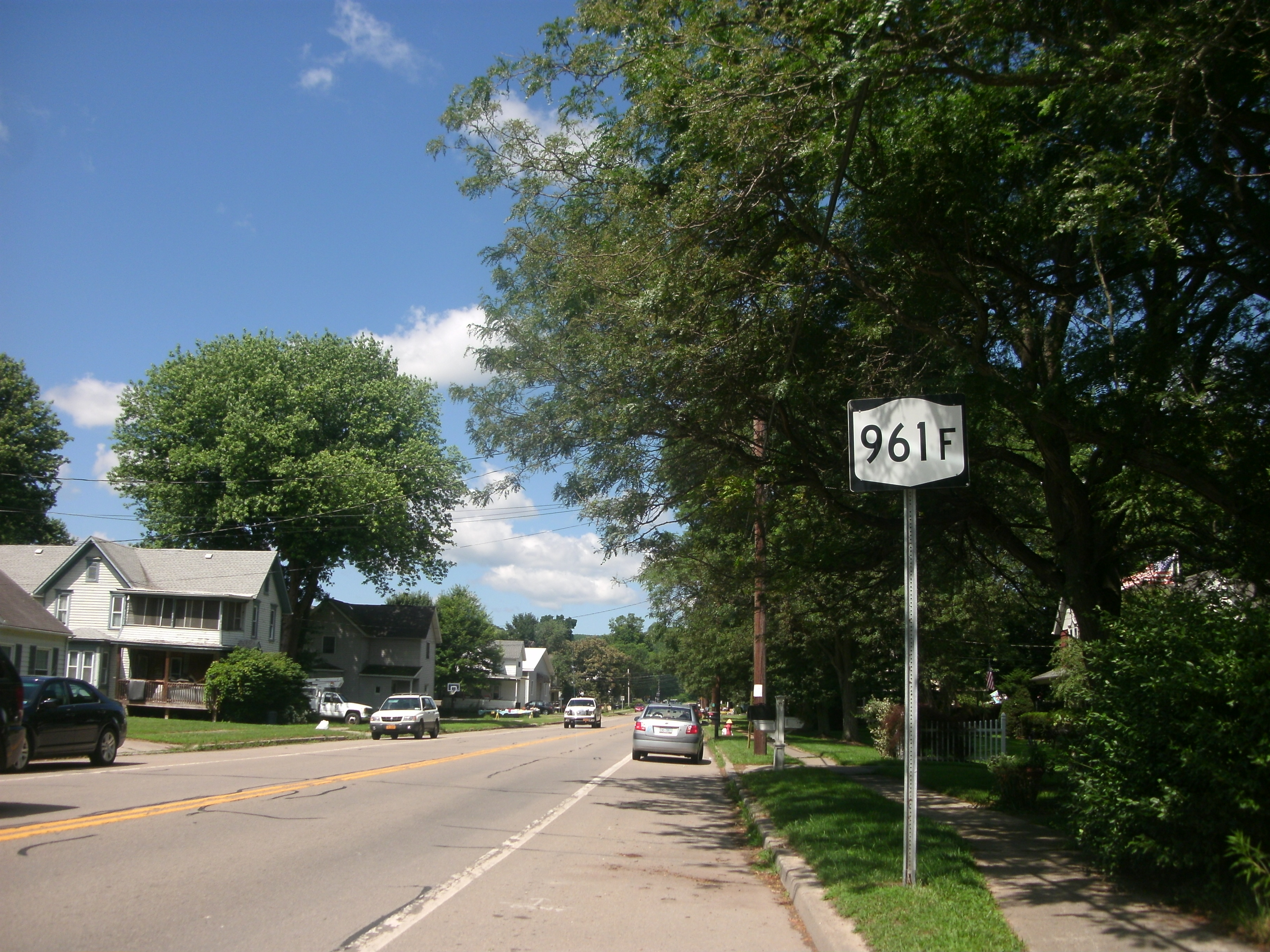
- NY 961F in Arkport

- Location within the state of New York
- Coordinates: 42°23′36″N 77°41′46″W
- Country: United States
- State: New York
- County: Steuben

Area
  - Total: 0.69 sq mi (1.80 km^{2})
  - Land: 0.69 sq mi (1.80 km^{2})
  - Water: 0 sq mi (0.00 km^{2})
- Elevation: 1,184 ft (361 m)

Population (2020)
  - Total: 745
  - Density: 1,073.1/sq mi (414.31/km^{2})
- Time zone: UTC-5 (Eastern (EST))
  - Summer (DST): UTC-4 (EDT)
- ZIP code: 14807
- Area code: 607
- FIPS code: 36-02583
- GNIS feature ID: 0942554

Arkport is a village in Steuben County, New York, United States. It is located in the town of Hornellsville, and is north of the city of Hornell. As of the 2020 census, Arkport had a population of 745. The name comes from the barges used to ship products through the village. The postal code is 14807.

Hornell Municipal Airport (HTF) is immediately south of the village.

== History ==
Arkport was founded in 1797 by Christopher Hurlbut. The Canisteo River was used to ship crops, livestock, and timber to Baltimore using arks. The navigable portion of the river ended in Arkport. This practice of using arks as cargo vessels continued until 1825, when the Erie Canal was built and it became more cost-effective to ship crops via the canal. The existing post office was built in 1890.

== Geography ==
Arkport is located at 42°23′36″N 77°41′46″W (42.393347, -77.696134).

According to the United States Census Bureau, the village has a total area of 0.7 square miles (1.8 km^{2}), all land.

The village is on the eastern bank of the Canisteo River.

New York State Route 36 passes from north to south through the village. The Southern Tier Expressway lies between the village and Hornell. County Roads 48 and 67 lead into the village.

== Demographics ==
Historical population
Census	Pop.	Note	%±
1840	175		—
1860	250		—
1920	463		—
1930	575		24.2%
1940	618		7.5%
1950	701		13.4%
1960	837		19.4%
1970	984		17.6%
1980	811		−17.6%
1990	770		−5.1%
2000	832		8.1%
2010	844		1.4%
2020	745		−11.7%
U.S. Decennial Census

At the 2000 census there were 832 people, 348 households, and 231 families in the village. The population density was 1,209.6 inhabitants per square mile (467.0/km^{2}). There were 364 housing units at an average density of 529.2 per square mile (204.3/km^{2}). The racial makeup of the village was 98.44% White, 0.60% African American, 0.12% Native American, 0.36% Asian, and 0.48% from two or more races. Hispanic or Latino of any race were 0.72%.

Of the 348 households 29.3% had children under the age of 18 living with them, 51.1% were married couples living together, 11.8% had a female householder with no husband present, and 33.6% were non-families. 29.9% of households were one person and 15.2% were one person aged 65 or older. The average household size was 2.39 and the average family size was 2.98.

The age distribution was 25.7% under the age of 18, 5.4% from 18 to 24, 23.2% from 25 to 44, 23.8% from 45 to 64, and 21.9% 65 or older. The median age was 42 years. For every 100 females, there were 80.1 males. For every 100 females age 18 and over, there were 76.1 males.

The median household income was $36,250 and the median family income was $48,684. Males had a median income of $36,136 versus $21,806 for females. The per capita income for the village was $16,170. About 1.4% of families and 5.0% of the population were below the poverty line, including 2.7% of those under age 18 and 3.2% of those age 65 or over.
