= Hornell Armory =

- U.S. National Register of Historic Places
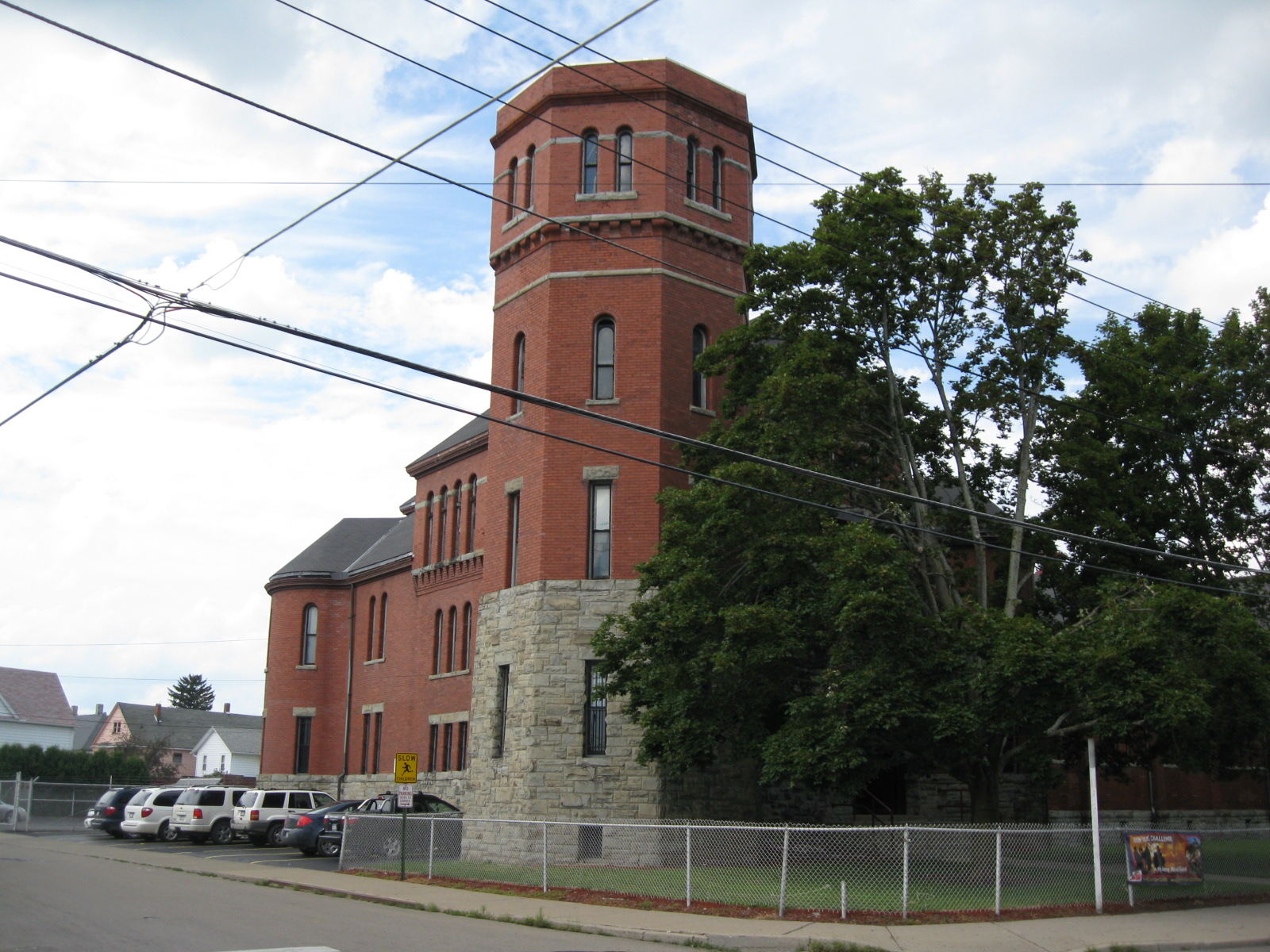
- Hornell Armory, August 2009

- Location within New York Location within the United States
- Location: 100 Seneca St., Hornell, New York
- Coordinates: 42°19′55″N 77°39′42″W
- Area: less than one acre
- Built: 1894
- Architect: Perry, I.G.
- Architectural style: Richardsonian Romanesque
- NRHP reference No.: 80002772
- Added to NRHP: May 06, 1980

Hornell Armory is a historic National Guard armory building located at Hornell in Steuben County, New York. It is a brick and stone castle-like structure built in 1894. It was designed by architect Isaac G. Perry. The three-story main structure has a four-story round corner tower. Attached to the main structure are an additional pair of two-story corner towers. Extending from the main structure is a long two-story wing with a gable roof and corner stair tower.

It was listed on the National Register of Historic Places in 1980.
