= Lincoln School (Hornell, New York) =

- U.S. National Register of Historic Places
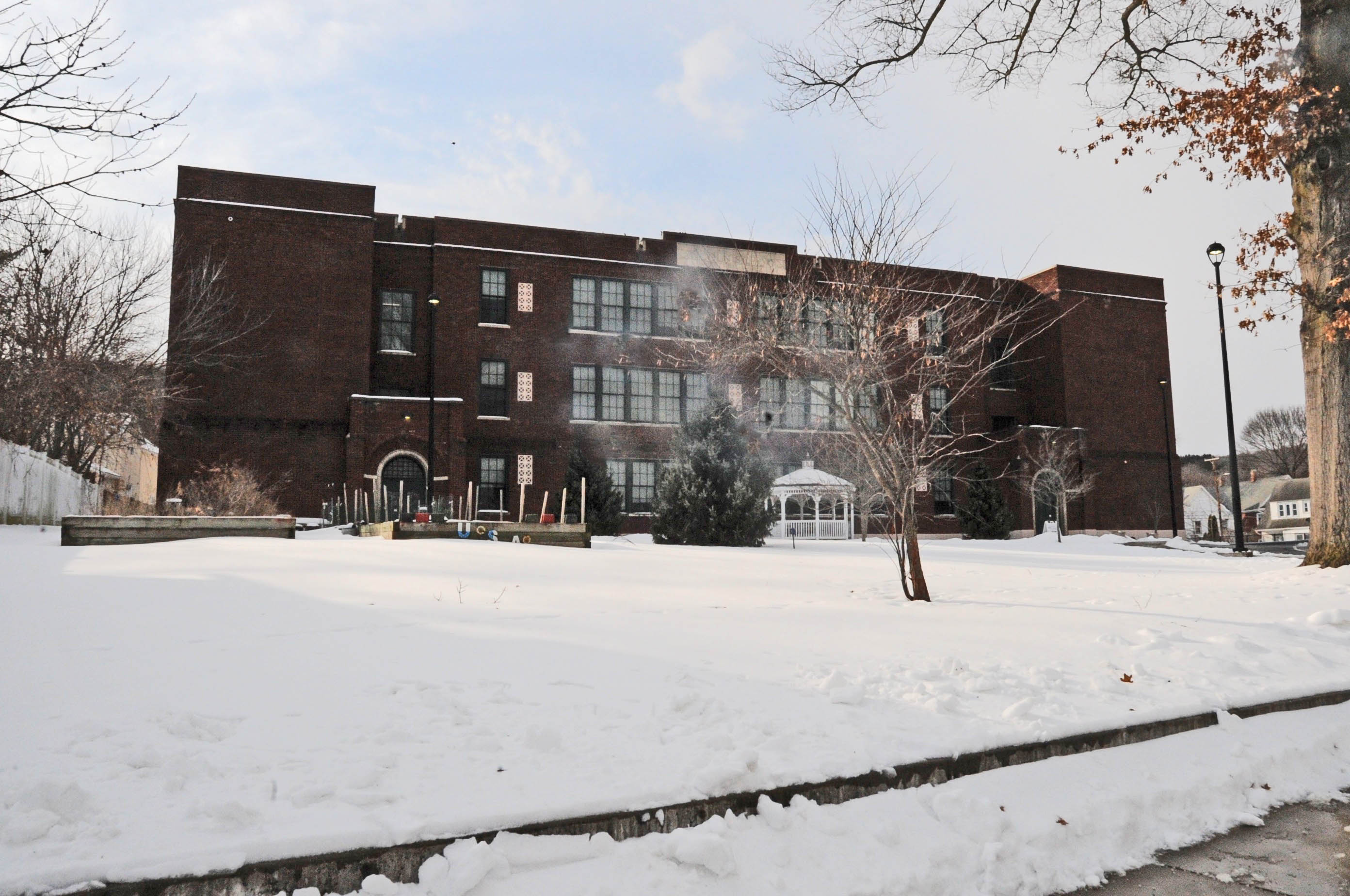

- Location within New York Location within the United States
- Location: 373 Canisteo Ave., Hornell, New York
- Coordinates: 42.3161°N 77.66175°W
- Area: less than one acre
- Built: 1923-1924
- Architect: Tooker & Marsh
- Architectural style: Neoclassical revival
- NRHP reference No.: 15000803
- Added to NRHP: November 17, 2015

Lincoln School is a historic elementary school building located at Hornell, Steuben County, New York. It was built in 1923–1924, and is a three-story, Neoclassical revival style dark brick building. It has a flat roof and brick and terra cotta trim. Attached to the main block is a two-story addition containing a combined gymnasium and auditorium. It served as a neighborhood elementary school until 1979 and as an office building until 2012.

It was listed on the National Register of Historic Places in 2015.
