= WYSL =

Coordinates: 42°51′16″N 77°42′39″W

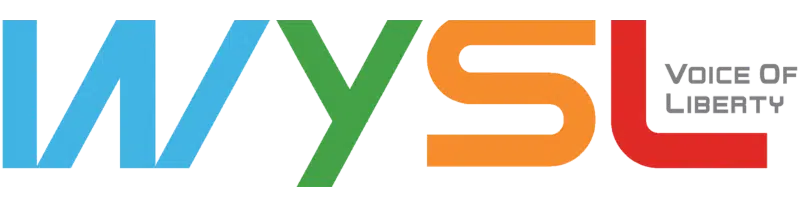
- Avon, New York; United States
- Broadcast area: Rochester metropolitan area Genesee River Valley
- Frequency: 1040 kHz
- Branding: WYSL NewsPower 1040, The Voice of Liberty

Programming
- Format: Talk radio
- Affiliations: Fox News Radio; Premiere Networks; Radio America; Townhall News; Westwood One; WHEC-TV

Ownership
- Owner: Robert Savage; (Radio Livingston)
- Sister stations: WLEA-FM, WLEA

History
- First air date: January 23, 1987
- Call sign meaning: easily pronounce the word "whistle"

Technical information
- Licensing authority: FCC
- Facility ID: 54665
- Class: B
- Power: 27,000 watts (day); 10,000 watts (critical hours); 500 watts (night)
- Translators: 92.1 W221CL (Rochester); 95.5 W238DE (Spencerport)
- Repeaters: 1480 WLEA (Hornell); 94.1 WLEA-FM (Hornell)

Links
- Public license information: Public file; LMS
- Webcast: Listen Live
- Website: wysl1040.com

WYSL (1040 AM) is a commercial radio station licensed to Avon, New York, and serving the Rochester metropolitan area. It broadcasts a talk radio format and is known as "WYSL NewsPower 1040, The Voice of Liberty." The station is owned by Robert C. Savage under the name "Radio Livingston."

By day, WYSL transmits with 27,000 watts, the second-most-powerful AM station in the Rochester area. 1040 AM is a clear channel frequency reserved for Class A WHO in Des Moines, at night WYSL must reduce power to 500 watts to avoid interference. A directional antenna with a four-tower array is used. Programming is also heard on two FM translators: W221CL at 92.1 MHz in Rochester and W238DE at 95.5 MHz in Spencerport.

== Programming ==
Weekdays begin with a wake-up talk and information program hosted by Pittsburgh radio personality Wendy Bell, who succeeded Jim Quinn in 2025. Several nationally syndicated conservative talk shows are also heard, Glenn Beck in late mornings, Jimmy Failla and Vince Coglianese in afternoons and Dana Loesch in the evening. Red Eye Radio from WBAP in Fort Worth is carried overnight.

Weekends are largely paid brokered programming, with shows on health, money, religion, guns and law. Retired state legislator Joseph Robach and former Libertarian gubernatorial candidate Larry Sharpe host weekly shows on the station. WYSL carries some local high school, college and minor league sports. Some newscasts from Channel 10 WHEC-TV, the NBC Network affiliate in Rochester, are simulcast on WYSL. Most hours begin with world and national news from Townhall News.

== History ==
=== All-News Radio ===
The WYSL call sign was taken from a radio station in Buffalo (the current WWWS). Management started the new WYSL in January 23, 1987, originally on 1030 kHz. But that frequency required the station to sign off at sunset. So the station moved to 1040 kHz, allowing it to broadcast around the clock.

The station began with an all-news radio format, combining local content with news programming from the Associated Press. The all-news format ended in 2006 for a number of reasons. First, the Associated Press discontinued its expanded radio services in July 2005. WYSL replaced the network with CNN Headline News, the only other national commercial all-news outlet available. After that, however, Headline News stopped broadcasting news in the evening, switching to talk and reality shows. This left a large hole in the schedule.

=== Adding Talk ===
As a result, WYSL picked up conservative talk hosts Laura Ingraham and Bill O'Reilly, and added Rusty Humphries and Jerry Doyle from the Talk Radio Network in the evening, as it transitioned to a News/Talk outlet.

WYSL was affiliated with ABC News Radio and the Wall Street Journal Radio Network, but switched to the Salem Radio Network for newscasts in 2012. It now airs a different Salem news service, Townhall News.

WYSL increased its daytime power from 2,500 watts to 20,000 watts in November 2006. It operates at reduced power at night to protect clear-channel station WHO in Des Moines, Iowa.

=== Local Talk Shows ===
WYSL continued to transition into a full-time talk radio station in 2007. Early in 2007, the station added its first local talk show, hosted by local attorney Bill Nojay, as well as picking up Dennis Miller in the afternoon drive time slot. Jim Bohannon was added for late evenings, while Jim Quinn's syndicated The War Room with Quinn and Rose was picked up in the morning drive, thus eliminating the last "all news" programming block on the station, in October 2007. Nojay's show began syndication in 2008 on WLEA in Hornell as well as on WGVA and its numerous simulcasts in the Finger Lakes.

An FM translator, W221CL, went on the air in early 2010 which covers the city of Rochester and portions of Monroe County. The FM station is branded "FM TALK 92.1 WYSL", which simulcasts WYSL 1040 AM.

=== Conflict with HD Radio ===
Owner Robert Savage has been a vocal opponent of HD Radio technology being used on the AM band, saying it causes interference and unnecessary broadcast delay for minimal gain in quality.

He filed a complaint with the Federal Communications Commission over interference caused by WBZ's nighttime HD signal on the adjacent 1030 kHz frequency,

=== Former Programs ===
Attorney Bill Nojay hosted a daily hour-long program on WYSL for several years, prior to his election to the New York State Assembly as well as during his tenure in the legislature. Nojay's show was syndicated across two other radio stations in upstate New York.

Nojay was still hosting the show when he committed suicide in 2016. Nojay's time slot was filled by Shannon Joy for a time.

Jim Quinn's morning show, in its various incarnations, remained on WYSL until Quinn's death in 2025.

Former logo

=== Expansion in Hornell ===
On November 11, 2024, Savage announced that he had struck an agreement to take over programming of WLEA in Hornell, New York in an effort to save that station from being shut down. WLEA and sister station WCKR had been in financial distress for several years, forcing its owner—the estate of Kevin Doran, who had died in 2015—to sell to Dawn Ichikawa.

== See also ==
- WHEC-TV
- WHAM (main commercial competitor)
- CNN Headline News
- The Wall Street Journal
