= Adrian, New York =

Hamlet in the state of New York, United States

- hamlet
- Location of Adrian in New York Adrian, New York (the United States)
- Coordinates: 42°15′16.26″N 77°31′14.95″W
- Country: United States
- State: New York
- County: Steuben
- Elevation: 1,135 ft (346 m)
- Time zone: UTC-5 (Eastern (EST))
  - Summer (DST): UTC-4 (EDT)
- ZIP code: 14823
- Area code: 607
- GNIS feature ID: 942193

Adrian (originally called "Crosby Ville") is a small hamlet located in Steuben County, New York, United States. Adrian lies in the Finger Lakes Region of upstate New York near Hornell. The hamlet has only two roads, Old Store Road and Catatunk Road. Its main ZIP code is 14823.

The community developed around an early lumber business and saw mill. It later became a railroad community with its own depot that served the needs of the surrounding farming communities.
