= Hornellsville, New York =

- Town
- Location within the state of New York
- Coordinates: 42°21′N 77°40′W
- Country: United States
- State: New York
- County: Steuben

Area
  - Total: 43.54 sq mi (112.78 km^{2})
  - Land: 43.33 sq mi (112.22 km^{2})
  - Water: 0.22 sq mi (0.56 km^{2})
- Elevation: 1,198 ft (365 m)

Population (2020)
  - Total: 4,039 ▼
  - Estimate (2021): 4,002
  - Density: 93/sq mi (36/km^{2})
- Time zone: UTC-5 (Eastern (EST))
  - Summer (DST): UTC-4 (EDT)
- FIPS code: 36-35683
- GNIS feature ID: 0979079
- Website: https://www.townofhornellsville.com/

Hornellsville is a town in Steuben County, New York, United States. The population, not counting the city of Hornell, was 4,039 at the 2020 census. The name is taken from a prominent pioneer family.

The Town of Hornellsville is at the western border of the county, and surrounds the city of Hornell. Until 1906, the city of Hornell was named Hornellsville.

The name Hornellsville is used only in real estate or legal contexts, but rarely in conversation. This is because Hornell is much more frequently mentioned, and its boundaries are quite different.

== History ==
The town was first settled circa 1790 in the vicinity of the modern city of Hornell.

The Town of Hornellsville was created in 1820 from part of the Town of Canisteo. Territory from Hornellsville was used to form the Towns of Hartsville (1844) and part of Fremont (1854).

In 1852, the community of Hornellsville became the incorporated Village of Hornellsville and in 1888 became the City of Hornellsville. It changed its name to the City of Hornell in 1906. The City of Hornell is surrounded by the Town of Hornellsville.

== Geography ==
According to the United States Census Bureau, the town has a total area of 43.7 square miles (113 km^{2}), of which 43.5 square miles (113 km^{2}) is land and 0.2 square miles (0.52 km^{2}) (0.41%) is water.

The Southern Tier Expressway (Interstate 86 and New York State Route 17) passes through the north part of the town. New York State Route 21 and New York State Route 36 intersect by Hornell.

The Canisteo River flows southward through the town.

The western town line is the border of Allegany County.

== Demographics ==
Historical population
Census	Pop.	Note	%±
1830	1,364		—
1840	2,121		55.5%
1850	2,637		24.3%
1860	4,230		60.4%
1870	5,837		38.0%
1880	9,852		68.8%
1890	1,939		−80.3%
1900	1,833		−5.5%
1910	2,047		11.7%
1920	1,829		−10.6%
1930	2,505		37.0%
1940	2,761		10.2%
1950	2,912		5.5%
1960	3,413		17.2%
1970	3,993		17.0%
1980	4,066		1.8%
1990	4,149		2.0%
2000	4,041		−2.6%
2010	4,151		2.7%
2020	4,039		−2.7%
2021 (est.)	4,002		−0.9%
U.S. Decennial Census

As of the census of 2000, there were 4,042 people, 1,669 households, and 1,098 families residing in the town. The population density was 93.0 inhabitants per square mile (35.9/km^{2}). There were 1,830 housing units at an average density of 42.1 per square mile (16.3/km^{2}). The racial makeup of the town was 97.92% White, 0.52% African American, 0.05% Native American, 0.82% Asian, 0.25% from other races, and 0.45% from two or more races. Hispanic or Latino of any race were 0.77% of the population.

There were 1,669 households, out of which 26.7% had children under the age of 18 living with them, 53.6% were married couples living together, 8.1% had a female householder with no husband present, and 34.2% were non-families. 29.5% of all households were made up of individuals, and 15.8% had someone living alone who was 65 years of age or older. The average household size was 2.34 and the average family size was 2.91.

In the town, the population was spread out, with 22.2% under the age of 18, 5.5% from 18 to 24, 22.6% from 25 to 44, 26.8% from 45 to 64, and 22.8% who were 65 years of age or older. The median age was 45 years. For every 100 females, there were 88.9 males. For every 100 females age 18 and over, there were 86.1 males.

The median income for a household in the town was $36,932, and the median income for a family was $48,688. Males had a median income of $33,426 versus $22,193 for females. The per capita income for the town was $20,803. About 4.2% of families and 8.4% of the population were below the poverty line, including 8.7% of those under age 18 and 3.6% of those age 65 or over.

== Communities and locations in the Town of Hornellsville ==
- Almond – The Village of Almond is on the western town line on NY-21.
- Almond Lake – A small lake northeast of Almond village.
- Arkport – The Village of Arkport is in the north part of the town on NY-36.
- On its north side, the Village of Canisteo abuts the town of Hornellsville. Some parts of Hornellsville are served by the Canisteo Post Office and have a Canisteo zip code.
- Glenwood Park, a former recreation south of Hornell. See Glenwood Inn (Hornellsville, New York).
- Hornell – The City of Hornell, technically not part of the Town of Hornellsville.
- Hornell Municipal Airport (4G6) – A general aviation airport between Hornell and Arkport.
- North Hornell – The Village of North Hornell is on NY-36.
- South Hornell – A hamlet south of Hornell on NY-36.
- Webbs Crossing – A location north of Hornell and by the Interstate on Steuben County Route 66.
- Thacherville – A group of houses just outside the City of Hornell.
- Heather Heights- A group of houses on the top of a hill.
- Belle Haven- A group of houses in the Southern Part of Hornellsville.

== Notable people ==
- Charles J. Helm, Kentucky politician, U.S. Consul General to Cuba, diplomat of the Confederate States
- Carl Edgar Myers, balloon inventor and aeronautical engineer scientist
- Bill Pullman, actor
- Solon O. Thacher, Kansas and New York politician and lawyer
