= Glenwood Inn =

Glenwood Inn may refer to

- The Glenwood Inn (Hornellsville, New York)
- The Mission Inn Hotel & Spa in Riverside, California, which was originally named the Glenwood Inn
