= WLEA =

Simulcast of WYSL, Avon
- Hornell, New York; United States
- Broadcast area: Canisteo Valley Area
- Frequency: 1480 kHz
- Branding: WELA Southern Tier

Programming
- Format: News/talk
- Affiliations: Fox News Radio; Premiere Networks; Radio America; Townhall News; Westwood One; WHEC-TV

Ownership
- Owner: Robert Savage; (Radio Livingston)
- Sister stations: WLEA-FM, WYSL

Technical information
- Licensing authority: FCC
- Facility ID: 52841
- Class: D
- Power: 2,500 watts day 19 watts night
- Transmitter coordinates: 42°17′15″N 77°38′47″W
- Translator: 106.9 W295CW (Hornell)

Links
- Public license information: Public file; LMS
- Webcast: Listen to WLEA; WLEA alternate feed
- Website: wlea.net

WLEA (1480 AM) is a radio station broadcasting a talk radio format. Licensed to Hornell, New York, United States, the station serves the Canisteo Valley area, and is a part of the Elmira Corning Radio Market The station is currently owned by Robert Savage, and operated as a simulcast of WYSL in Avon, New York.

== FM translator ==
An FM translator is used to widen the coverage area of WLEA, especially at night when the AM broadcasting signal reduces power to only 19 watts.

Broadcast translator for WLEA
Call sign	Frequency	City of license	FID	ERP (W)	Class	FCC info
W295CW	106.9 FM	Hornell, New York	200909	250	D	LMS

== History ==
WLEA signed on in 1948 on 1320 kHz; two years later, the 1320 slot was bought out by WWHG, later the now-defunct WHHO, necessitating the station to move to a new frequency. It was part of the Mutual Broadcasting System. Actor Bob Crane was one of the station's earliest employees, beginning as a janitor and later hosting "The 1480 Club." The station's owner Pmj Communications was founded by Kevin Doran, who also hosted the station's morning show for a time in the 1970s, then again from the early 1990s until his death in 2015; his estate continued to own the company and sister station WCKR until 2024. Previously, the station was owned by Charlie Henderson, who represented Hornell in the State Assembly (1956–1981).

Programming heard on WLEA includes This Morning: America's First News, The Rush Limbaugh Show, The Sean Hannity Show, Jim Bohannon, John Batchelor, a local interview show called "Newsmaker Show" and the "1480 Club", as well as local news updates, ABC News Radio and Fox News Radio.

WLEA is the broadcast home of the Hornell Dodgers team and also carries Hornell High School athletics (sister station WCKR carries Canisteo–Greenwood High School sports).

The Doran estate had been under substantial financial distress since January 2020, forcing them to briefly take WCKR to an all-talk format to reduce the cost of music royalties. Doran's son Brendan had been in negotiations to sell the station to Gordon Ichikawa, which had been foiled by Ichikawa's death in December 2023; Ichikawa's widow Dawn eventually agreed to buy the station, despite having no interest in operating it. Dawn Ichikawa had planned all along to shut the station down due to the dire financial straits of the station and the ones she had inherited from her late husband. On November 6, 2024, it was announced that WLEA 1480 along with its FM translator 106.9 W295CW, will shut down permanently on November 11, 2024, due to lack of sponsors and support. Days after the announcement, radio station WYSL in Avon, New York agreed to provide programming to WLEA to keep the station operational.
