= North Hornell, New York =

- Village
- Location within the state of New York
- Coordinates: 42°20′44″N 77°39′39″W
- Country: United States
- State: New York
- County: Steuben

Government
  - Mayor: John Falci

Area
  - Total: 0.49 sq mi (1.27 km^{2})
  - Land: 0.49 sq mi (1.27 km^{2})
  - Water: 0 sq mi (0.00 km^{2})
- Elevation: 1,165 ft (355 m)

Population (2020)
  - Total: 732
  - Density: 1,491.8/sq mi (575.98/km^{2})
- Time zone: UTC-5 (Eastern (EST))
  - Summer (DST): UTC-4 (EDT)
- FIPS code: 36-53055
- GNIS feature ID: 0958823

North Hornell is a village in Steuben County, New York, United States. As of the 2020 census, North Hornell had a population of 732. The village is entirely within the town of Hornellsville, north of the city Hornell.

== History ==
In 2004, the North Hornell village council started studies on whether a possible merger with the city of Hornell or dissolving the village wiykd reduce annual costs. The citizens of the village voted not to merge with the city of Hornell.

== Geography ==
North Hornell is located at 42°20′44″N 77°39′39″W.

According to the United States Census Bureau, the village has a total area of .6 square miles (1.6 km^{2}), all land.

Conjoined New York State Route 21 and New York State Route 36 form a major highway through the village.

North Hornell is on the north bank of the Canisteo River.

Elmhurst Creek runs through the village.

== Demographics ==
Historical population
Census	Pop.	Note	%±
1930	452		—
1940	589		30.3%
1950	605		2.7%
1960	917		51.6%
1970	919		0.2%
1980	813		−11.5%
1990	822		1.1%
2000	851		3.5%
2010	778		−8.6%
2020	732		−5.9%
U.S. Decennial Census

As of the census of 2000, there were 851 people, 303 households, and 210 families residing in the village. The population density was 1,533.4 inhabitants per square mile (592.0/km^{2}). There were 324 housing units at an average density of 583.8 per square mile (225.4/km^{2}). The racial makeup of the village was 97.06% White, 0.47% African American, 1.88% Asian, 0.12% from other races, and 0.47% from two or more races. Hispanic or Latino of any race were 1.06% of the population.

There were 303 households, out of which 30.4% had children under the age of 18 living with them, 55.4% were married couples living together, 7.6% had a female householder with no husband present, and 30.4% were non-families. 26.1% of all households were made up of individuals, and 16.8% had someone living alone who was 65 years of age or older. The average household size was 2.39 and the average family size was 2.88.

In the village, the population was spread out, with 19.6% under the age of 18, 4.7% from 18 to 24, 20.4% from 25 to 44, 24.2% from 45 to 64, and 31.0% who were 65 years of age or older. The median age was 48 years. For every 100 females, there were 81.1 males. For every 100 females age 18 and over, there were 76.7 males.

The median income for a household in the village was $48,571, and the median income for a family was $61,125. Males had a median income of $42,000 versus $23,125 for females. The per capita income for the village was $24,825. About 3.4% of families and 6.5% of the population were below the poverty line, including 5.5% of those under age 18 and 1.9% of those age 65 or over.

== See also ==
- Bethesda Hospital
