= United States Post Office (Hornell, New York) =

- Old Post Office
- U.S. National Register of Historic Places
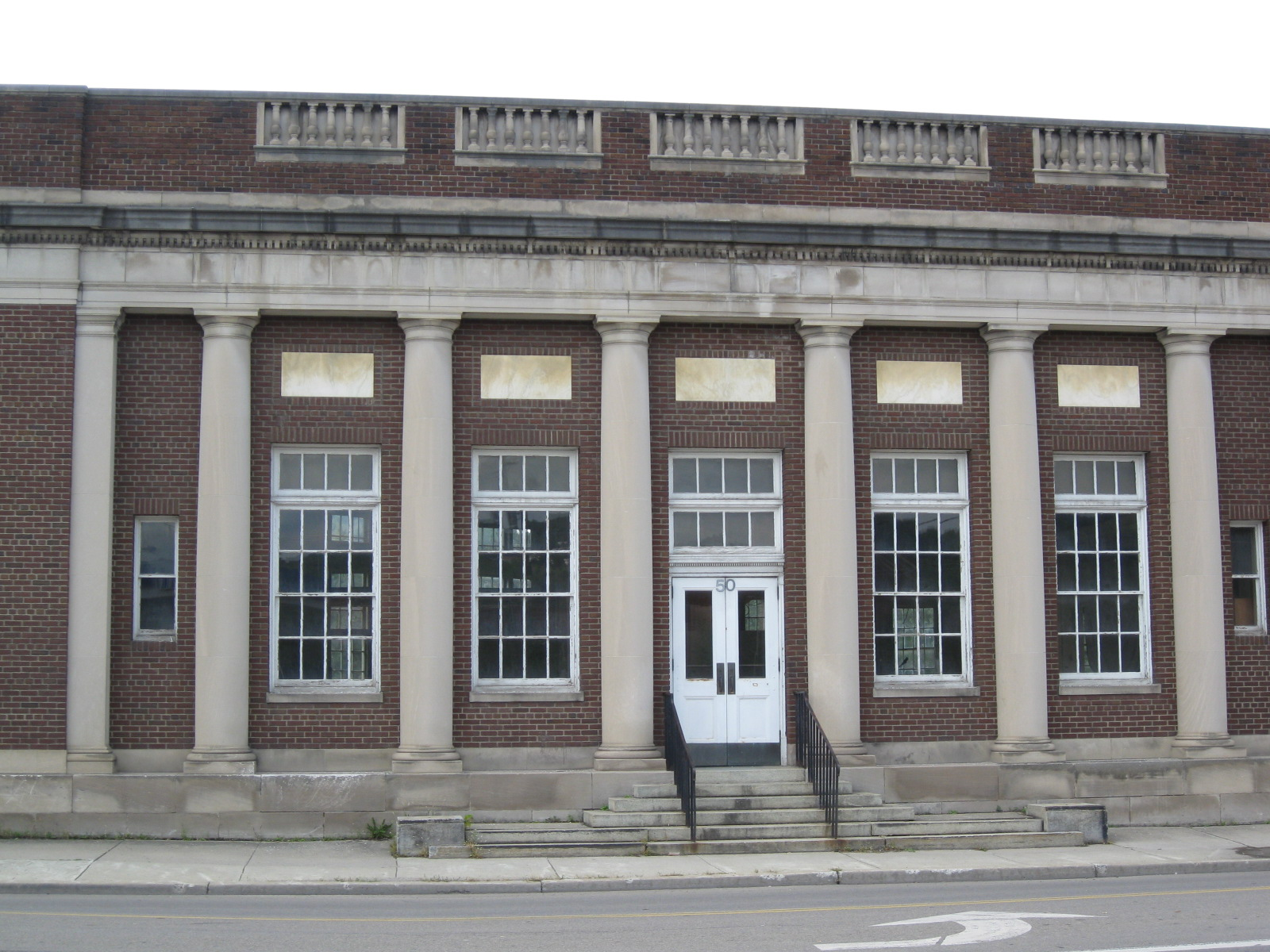
- Old Post Office, Hornell, NY, August 2009

- Location within New York Location within the United States
- Interactive map showing the location for U.S. Post Office-Hornell
- Location: 50 Seneca St., Hornell, New York
- Coordinates: 42°19′44.7882″N 77°39′41.9214″W
- Area: less than one acre
- Built: 1916
- Architect: James A. Wetmore, George A. Stiles
- Architectural style: Colonial Revival
- MPS: US Post Offices in New York State, 1858-1943, TR
- NRHP reference No.: 97001458
- Added to NRHP: December 08, 1997

The former U.S. Post Office in Hornell, Steuben County, New York, United States, is located on Seneca Street. It was built in 1916 and is one of a number of post offices in New York State designed by the Office of the Supervising Architect of the Treasury Department, James A. Wetmore. It is a neo-Georgian, Colonial Revival style structure. It was vacated by the post office in 1965 and served as offices for the Hornell Board of Education and District Administration until 1989. In 1996 it was purchased by Jerome S. O'Connor, and it was listed on the National Register of Historic Places in 1997.

== Zachary Smith Post Office ==
On August 3, 2010, the new Hornell Post Office, now located at 23 Genesee Street, was officially renamed the Zachary Smith Post Office after Lance Corporal Zachary Smith of the United States Marine Corps, who died in action in Operation Enduring Freedom in January 2010. As part of a U.S. Postal Service policy, Smith's name was only allowed on a plaque inside the building. After intervention by elected officials, the U.S. Postal Service agreed in July 2012 to place Smith's name on the outside of the building, and a dedication ceremony took place on January 28, 2013.
