= Hornell Raceway =

Defunct auto racing venue in Hartsville, New York

- Location: Hartsville, New York
- Coordinates: 42.2696°N 77.6473°W
- Owner: Paul Amidon
- Broke ground: 1958
- Opened: 1959
- Closed: 1965
- Surface: Clay
- Length: .536 km (0.333 mi)
- Banking: High-banked

Hornell Raceway was a 1/3-mile (0.54 km) dirt oval racing facility in the Finger Lakes Region of New York State.

== Overview ==
Paul Amidon was a crewman working area racing events when, in 1958, he decided to build his own racetrack on land he owned at the outskirts of Hornell, New York. The track opened in 1959 with a lack of race car entries and a rough and dusty track surface. Amidon quickly switched to hosting the more popular “B-Class” (sportsman) and “Modern” (hobby stock) cars, and resolved the track surface issues.

The Hornell region was a significant repair and maintenance center for the railroad, with a massive railroad yard and repair shops that were among the largest in the country at the time. Many race spectators were on train crews that were subject to short notice calls to work. To accommodate them Amidon installed a telephone in the announcer booth so that the train dispatcher could have crew members paged.

Racing continued through the 1965 season, after which Amidon had the property restored for farming operations.
