= WLEA-FM =

Radio station in Hornell, New York

Simulcast of WYSL, Avon
- Hornell, New York; United States
- Broadcast area: Elmira-Corning area
- Frequency: 92.1 MHz
- Branding: WELA Southern Tier

Programming
- Format: Talk radio

Ownership
- Owner: Robert Savage; (Radio Livingston)
- Sister stations: WLEA, WYSL

History
- First air date: June 1981
- Former call signs: WCKR (until 2025)
- Call sign meaning: FM counterpart to WLEA

Technical information
- Licensing authority: FCC
- Facility ID: 52842
- Class: A
- ERP: 2,550 watts
- HAAT: 155 meters
- Transmitter coordinates: 42°20′38″N 77°37′36″W

Links
- Public license information: Public file; LMS
- Website: WLEA.net

WLEA-FM (92.1 FM) is a radio station licensed to Hornell, New York, United States, the station serves the Canisteo Valley area. The station is currently owned by Bob Savage.

For most of its history on air, WCKR was a country music station, a format it abandoned in May 2017 in favor of top 40. On February 1, 2020, WCKR changed formats from pop music to sports, branded as "92.1 The Team". The station acknowledged that the 2020 format flip was strictly financial, as they could no longer afford to pay royalties to play music. On August 14, 2020, amid widespread disruption of the sporting world in spring and summer 2020, WCKR relaunched the Fun 92.1 branding and its Top 40 format six months later.

On November 11, 2024, Dawn Ichikawa, owner of WVIN and WABH, announced an agreement to purchase WCKR and WLEA from the Doran family. Ichikawa's husband Gordon had been negotiating with Doran's son Brendan to buy the stations before Gordon's death in December 2023. Dawn Ichikawa had no interest in maintaining the station and had planned on closing down the station had she not found another buyer. She eventually found one in Bob Savage, owner of WYSL. In 2025, the station changed its call sign to WLEA-FM, matching its sister station, as by then both had begun simulcasting WYSL.

The transmitter facilities are located on Tobes Hill.
