= Bethesda Hospital (North Hornell, New York) =

Former hospital in North Hornell, New York, United States

Coordinates: 42°20′53″N 77°39′48″W

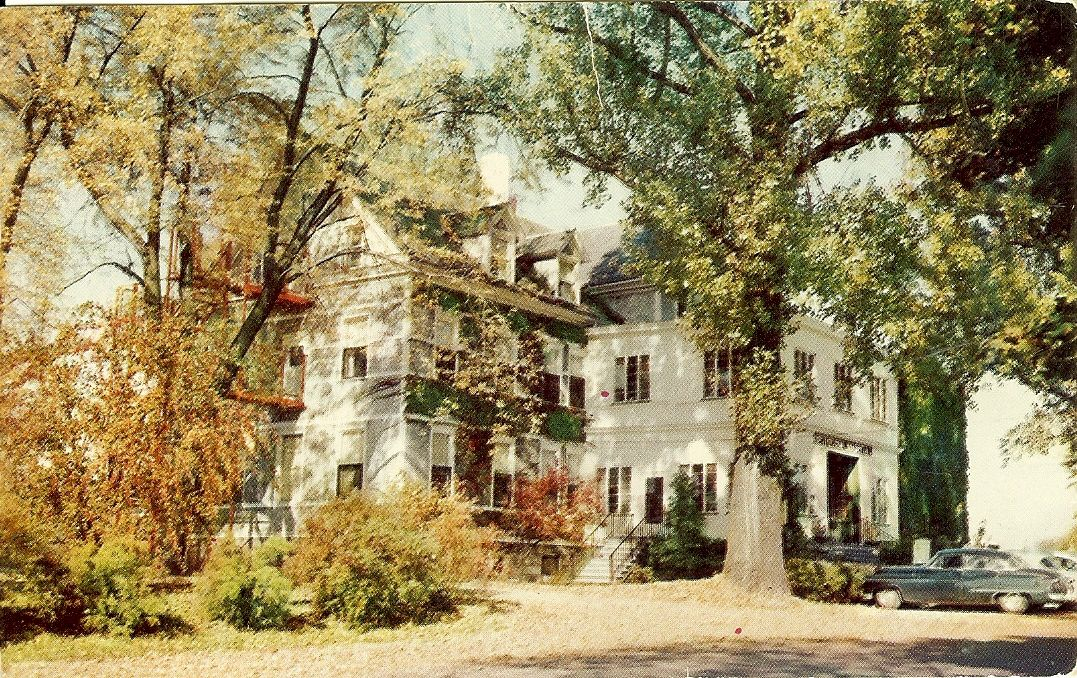
Old Bethesda Hospital, North Hornell, NY

Bethesda Hospital was a general-purpose hospital in the village of North Hornell, New York. It operated from approximately 1920–1970.

== History ==
Bethesda's first facility was a frame building on Chambers Street. Having outgrown that facility, it built and moved into a much larger, single-story brick facility, located at 1 Bethesda Drive, about 1961. The hospital was unable to meet its loan payments and had to close. The former hospital is now Elderwood of Hornell, a proprietary (for profit) long-term care facility. After Bryant North Hornell Elementary School, it is the largest employer in North Hornell.

== See also ==
- List of hospitals in New York (state)
