= Glenwood Inn (Hornellsville, New York) =

Coordinates: 42.301°N 77.652°W

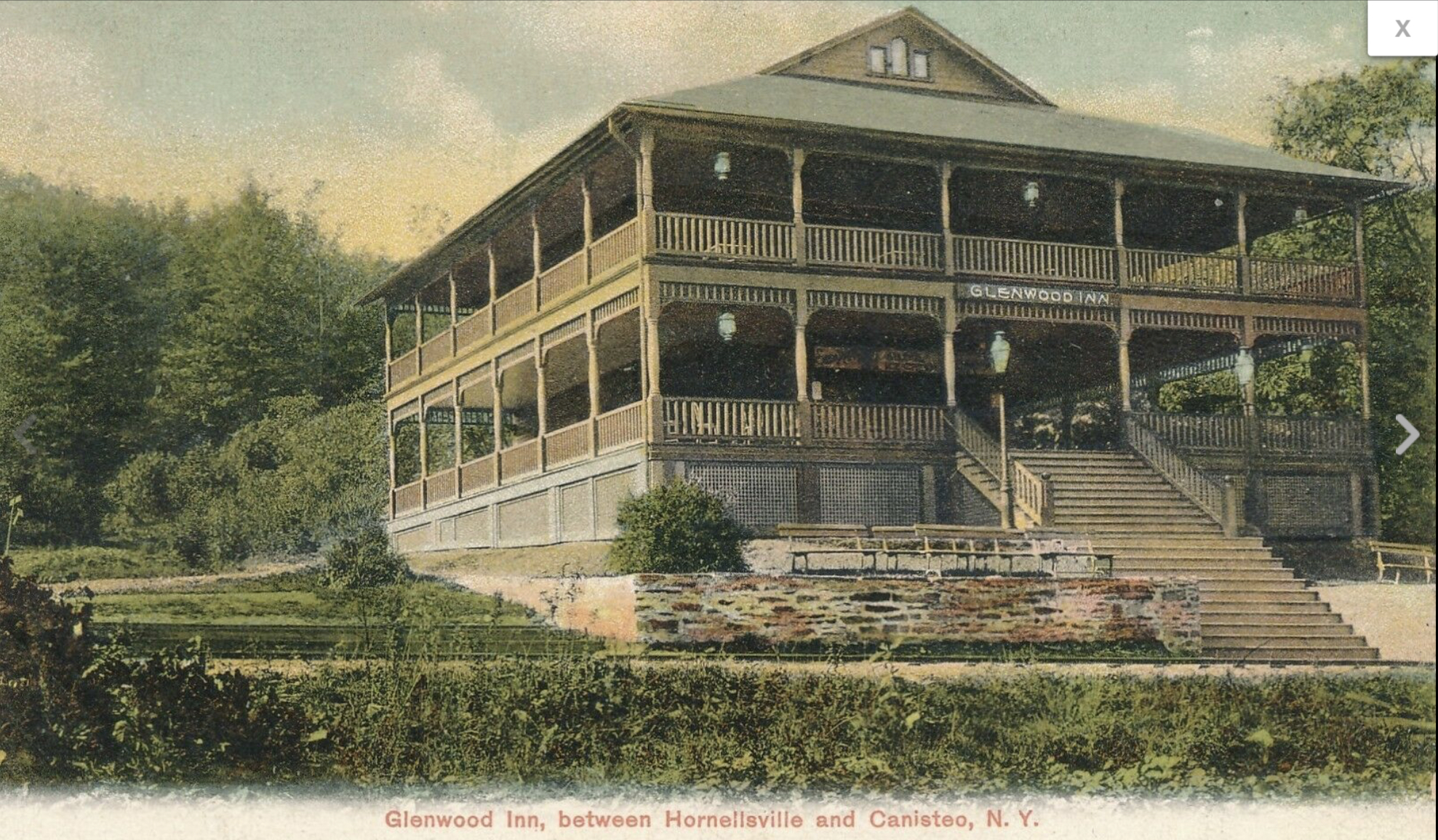
Glenwood Inn, Hornellsville (the town), New York. Hand-colored postcard from 1901–07. The card says "between Hornellsville and Canisteo", meaning between the city of Hornell, then called Hornellsville, and Canisteo.

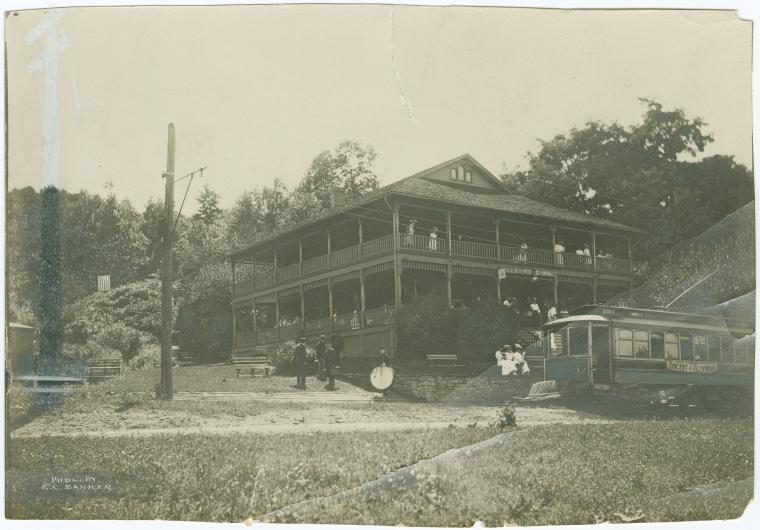
Glenwood Inn, Hornellsville, New York, with the Hornell-Canisteo electric trolley in front. The banner on the trolley says "Concert at Glenwood". Note man carrying a drum. Since the trolley was standing still long enough for a picture to be taken — at the time pictures required technical setup — this must have been a Sunday excursion train, stopped at the end of the route before starting back to Hornellsville.

The Glenwood Inn was "one of the best known summer resorts in this section of the state and Hornell's leading place of recreation". Glenwood Park was 2 miles (3.2 km) south of Hornellsville (after 1906, Hornell) and 3 miles (4.8 km) north of Canisteo, at Midway Court, in the hamlet of South Hornell. 25 acres (10 ha) in size, it was developed by the owners of the Hornellsville & Canisteo Electric Railroad, inaugurated in 1892, on "a wooded glen and bluff" and "a mile of river" they purchased, so as to build ridership by creating a destination. The Inn opened in 1895. Adjacent to it were a dance hall, which also served as a skating rink, a bandstand/pavilion, merry-go-round, picnic tables, a tennis court, and a boathouse where rowboats could be rented for use in an artificial lake created by a small dam on the Canisteo River. Boys could swim in the river (few girls were interested), and "trails for hiking ran back up on the hill through the glen". It was a venue for concerts by the Canisteo Band or one from a neighboring community, banquets, dances, and picnics. "Not a day goes but what a more or less large party visits the spot". No alcohol was served. On Sundays there were excursion trains to it. In the winter it was closed.

The entire complex was destroyed by fire in 1923.

== See also ==
- Hornell Traction Company
