= Hornell Municipal Airport =

Airport near Hornell, New York, U.S.

- IATA: none; ICAO: KHTF; FAA LID: HTF

Summary
- Airport type: Public
- Owner: City of Hornell
- Serves: Hornell, New York
- Elevation AMSL: 1,220 ft (370 m)
- Coordinates: 42°22′56″N 077°40′56″W

Map
- Location of airport in New York

Runways
Direction	Length		Surface
Direction	ft	m	Surface
18/36	5,000	1,524	Asphalt

Statistics (2009)
- Aircraft operations: 19,902
- Based aircraft: 19
- Source: Federal Aviation Administration

Hornell Municipal Airport (ICAO: KHTF, FAA LID: HTF, formerly 4G6) is a city-owned public-use airport located three nautical miles (6 km) north of the central business district of Hornell, a city in Steuben County, New York, United States. It is included in the National Plan of Integrated Airport Systems for 2011–2015, which categorized it as a general aviation airport.

Although most U.S. airports use the same three-letter location identifier for the FAA and IATA, this airport is assigned HTF by the FAA, but has no designation from the IATA (which assigned HTF to Hatfield Airport in the Hatfield, Hertfordshire, England).

== Facilities and aircraft ==
Hornell Municipal Airport covers an area of 54 acres (22 ha) at an elevation of 1,220 feet (372 m) above mean sea level. It has one runway designated 18/36 with an asphalt surface measuring 5,000 by 75 feet (1,524 x 23 m).

For the 12-month period ending September 4, 2009, the airport had 19,902 aircraft operations, an average of 54 per day: 90% general aviation and 10% air taxi. At that time there were 19 aircraft based at this airport: 89.5% single-engine, and 10.5% multi-engine.

== See also ==
- List of airports in New York
