= Canisteo River =

River in the U.S. state of New York

Coordinates: 42°23′22.8″N 77°43′50″W

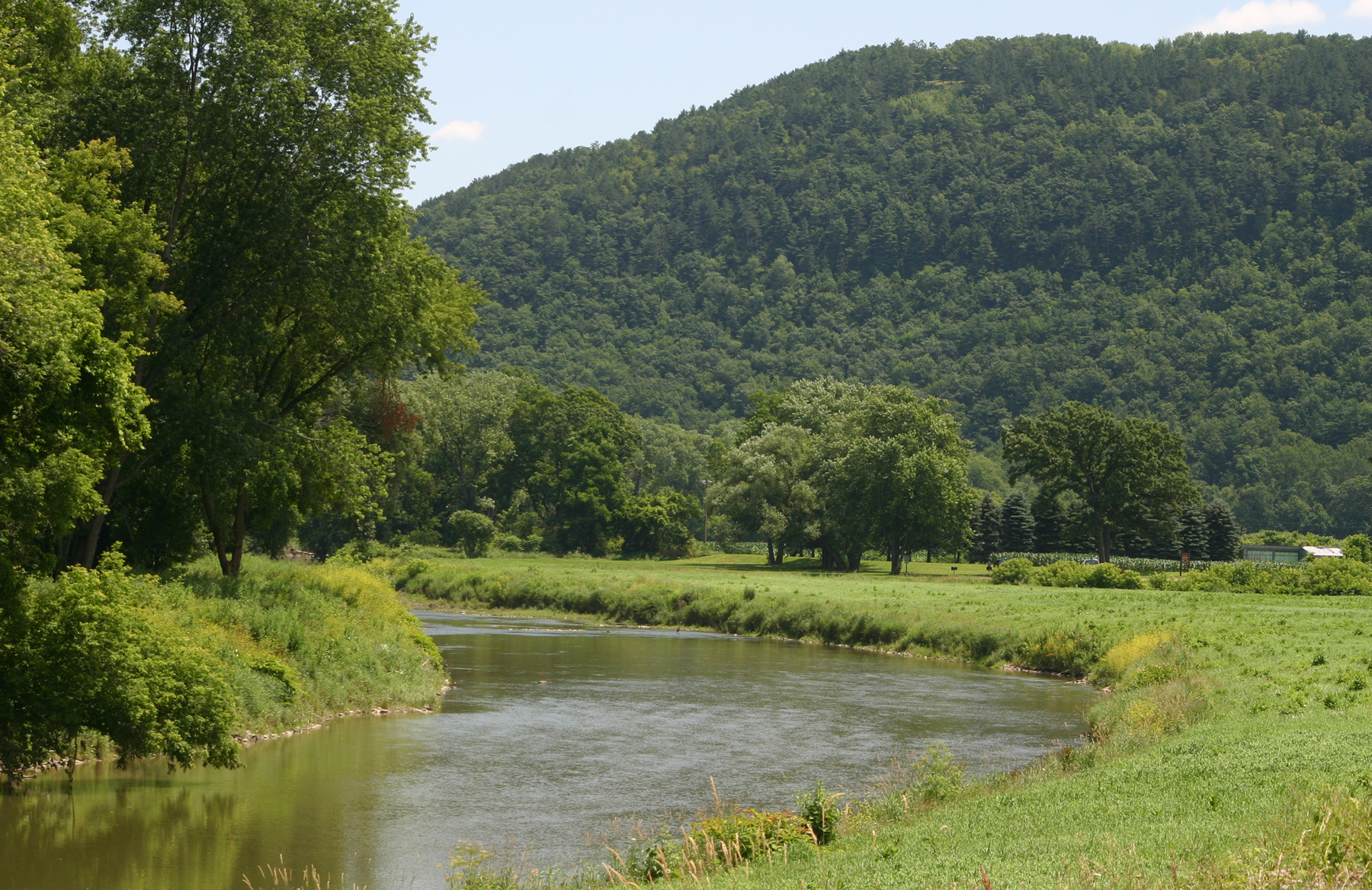
Canisteo River below Addison, New York

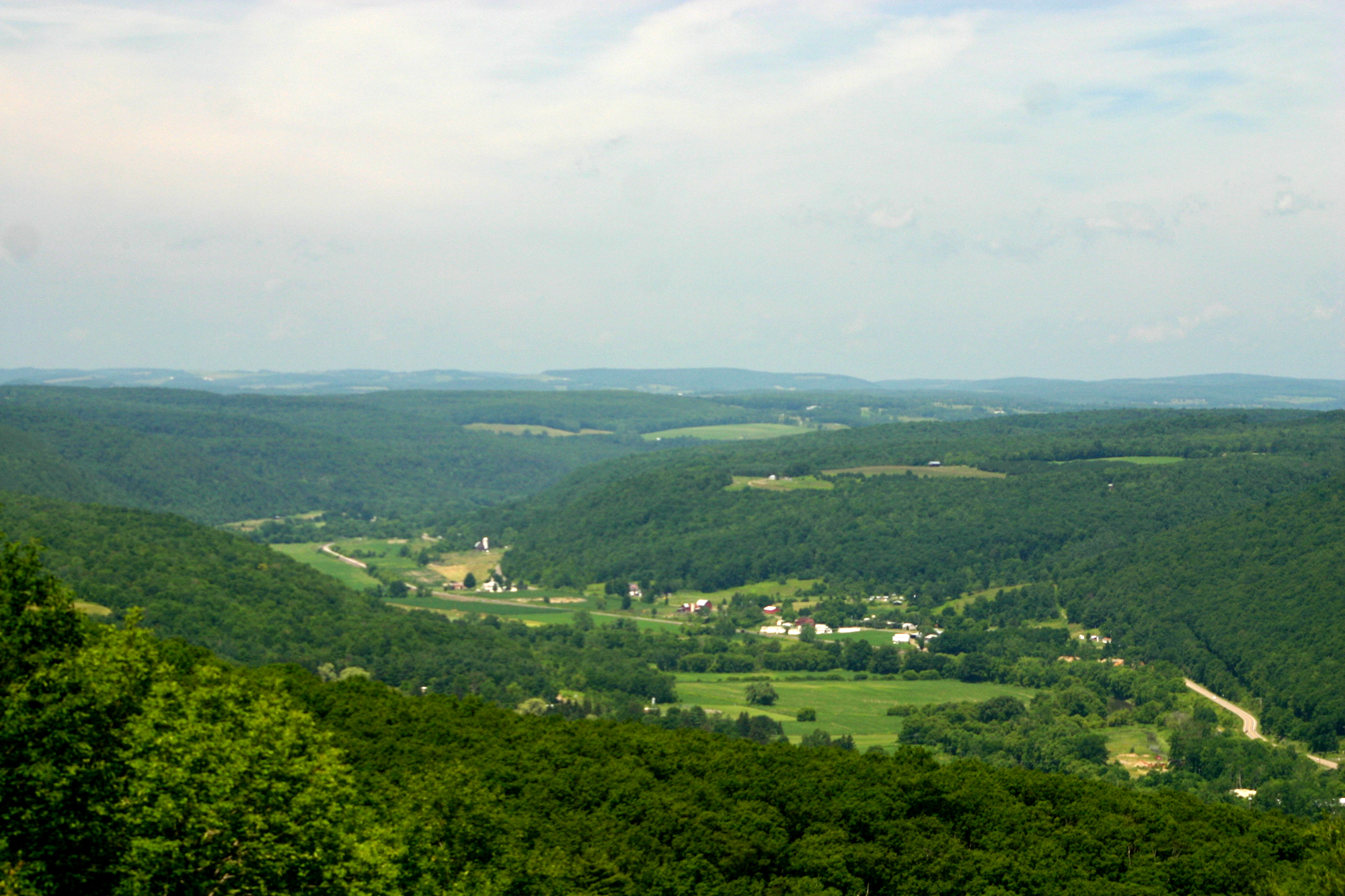
Canisteo River Valley from Pinnacle State Park

The Canisteo River is a 61.0-mile-long (98.2 km) tributary of the Tioga River in western New York in the United States. It drains a dissected plateau, a portion of the northern Allegheny Plateau southwest of the Finger Lakes region, in the far northwestern reaches of the watershed of the Susquehanna River.

It rises in the hills of northern Allegany County, New York approximately 15 miles (24 km) southwest of Dansville, New York. It flows east into northern Steuben County, New York, then generally southeast past Hornell, New York and Canisteo, New York. It joins the Tioga from the west in southeastern Steuben County, approximately 10 miles (16 km) north of the Pennsylvania state line and 5 miles (8 km) southwest of Corning, New York.

The origin of the name of the river is obscure, likely from the Algonquian languages subfamily of American indigenous languages meaning either "pickerel" or "head of water".

== History ==
The Canisteo River empties via the Tioga into the Chemung River, and it into the Susquehanna River. This allowed goods transported on the Canisteo River to reach the Atlantic via the ports of Havre de Grace and Perryville, Maryland, midway between Baltimore and Philadelphia. Prior to the opening of the Erie Canal in 1825, this was western New York State's most direct route for products going to market. As on other rivers in the Susquehanna basin, transportation on the Canisteo before the middle of the 19th century was often accomplished by arks up to 75 feet (23 m) long. Arkport, New York, on the Canisteo River, was the highest navigable point in the Susquehanna watershed.

Since the upper headwaters went through virgin forest, an early timber industry developed. Logs were floated down the river after being cut. Livestock and crops soon followed.

In the floods of 1936, the river overflowed and inundated parts of the Canisteo and Hornell, leading to the construction of flood control systems in both communities. The only flooding since then was from Hurricane Agnes of 1972, in which the river destroyed the Erie Railroad line south of Hornell and New York Route 36 between Canisteo and Hornell, which was rebuilt further from the river.

== See also ==
- List of New York rivers
- Canisteo (village), New York
- Canisteo, New York
