= Hornell, New York =

Hornell
- City
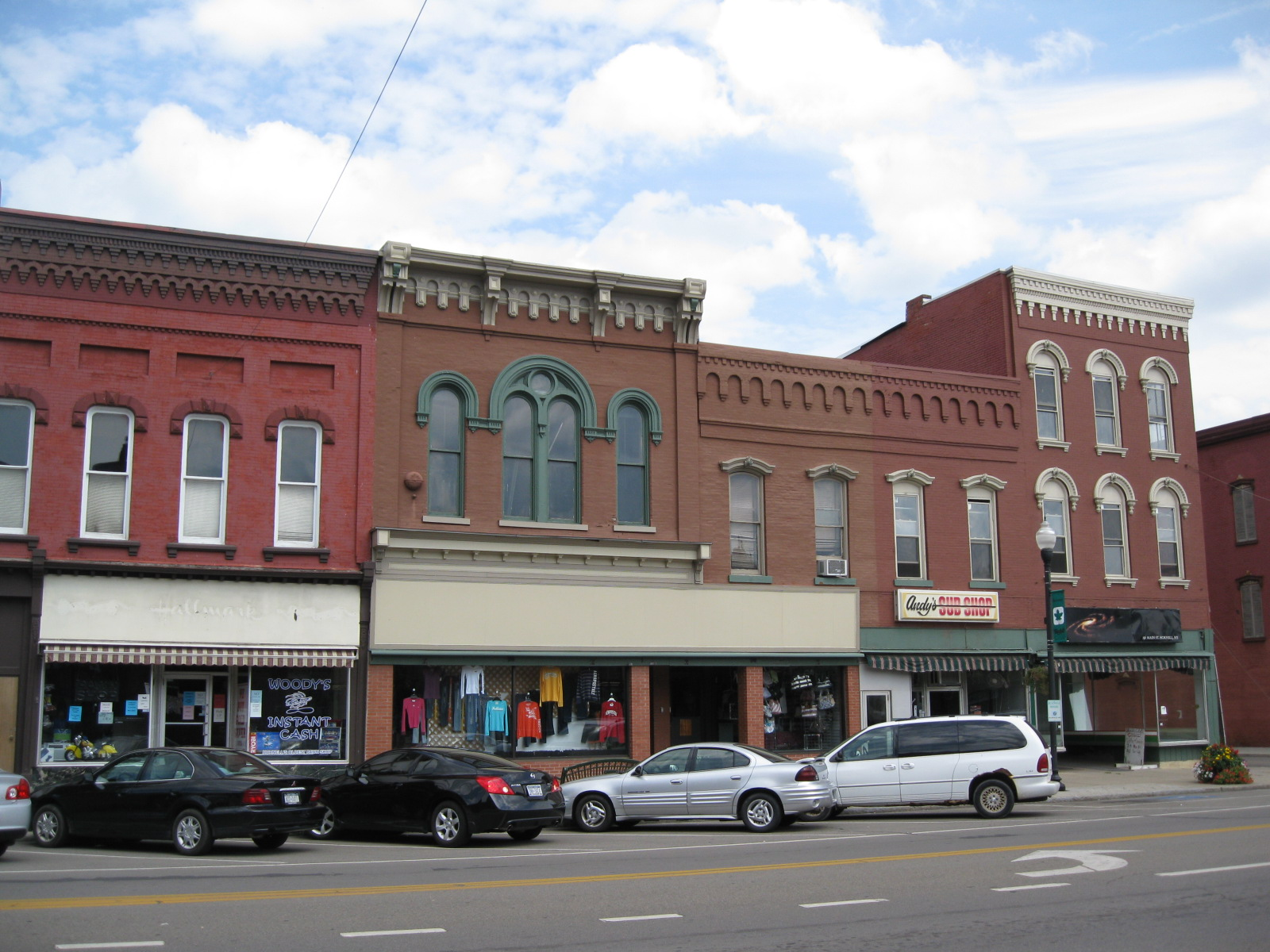
- Downtown Hornell
- Nickname: Maple City,
- Location within the state of New York
- Coordinates: 42°19′N 77°40′W
- Country: United States
- State: New York
- County: Steuben
- First settled: 1790
- Incorporated (Town of Hornellsville): 1820
- Incorporated (Village of Hornellsville): 1852
- Incorporated (City of Hornellsville/Hornell): 1888/1906

Government
  - Type: (Mayor-Council)
  - Mayor: John Buckley (R)
  - City Council: • W1: David Sutfin (R) • W2: Christina Hancock (R) • W3: Joseph McKay (R) • W4: Steve Peck (R) • W5: Daniel Warriner (R) • W6: Lita Brown (R) • W7: Kevin Valentine (R) • W8: James M. Bassage (R) • W9: Shannon Davis (R) • W10: John Carbone (D)

Area
  - Total: 3.28 sq mi (8.49 km^{2})
  - Land: 3.28 sq mi (8.49 km^{2})
  - Water: 0 sq mi (0.00 km^{2})
- Elevation: 1,161 ft (354 m)

Population (2020)
  - Total: 8,263
  - Density: 2,520.3/sq mi (973.08/km^{2})
- Time zone: UTC−5 (Eastern (EST))
  - Summer (DST): UTC−4 (EDT)
- ZIP Code: 14843
- Area code: 607
- FIPS code: 36-35672
- GNIS feature ID: 0975771
- Website: City website

Hornell is a city in Steuben County, New York, United States. The population was 8,259 at the 2020 census. The city is named after the Hornell family, early settlers.

The City of Hornell is surrounded by the Town of Hornellsville. Hornell is about 55 miles (89 km) south of Rochester and is near the western edge of Steuben County.

Hornell is nicknamed the "Maple City" after the large maple trees that once grew throughout the town and covered the surrounding hills of the Canisteo Valley. Hornell residents celebrate with one of the largest Saint Patrick's Day parades and celebrations in the area, bringing many out to welcome spring and show their green.

== History ==
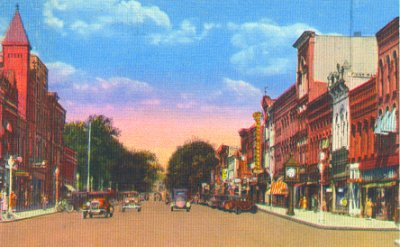
Main Street, Hornell in the 1920s

What is now Hornell was first settled in 1790 under the name "Upper Canisteo", to distinguish it from the community of Canisteo, then known as "Lower Canisteo". The family of Benjamin Crosby were the first settlers in what is now Hornell. The area was incorporated as a town in 1820, as "Hornellsville." The name comes from early settler George Hornell Jr, who built the first gristmill here.

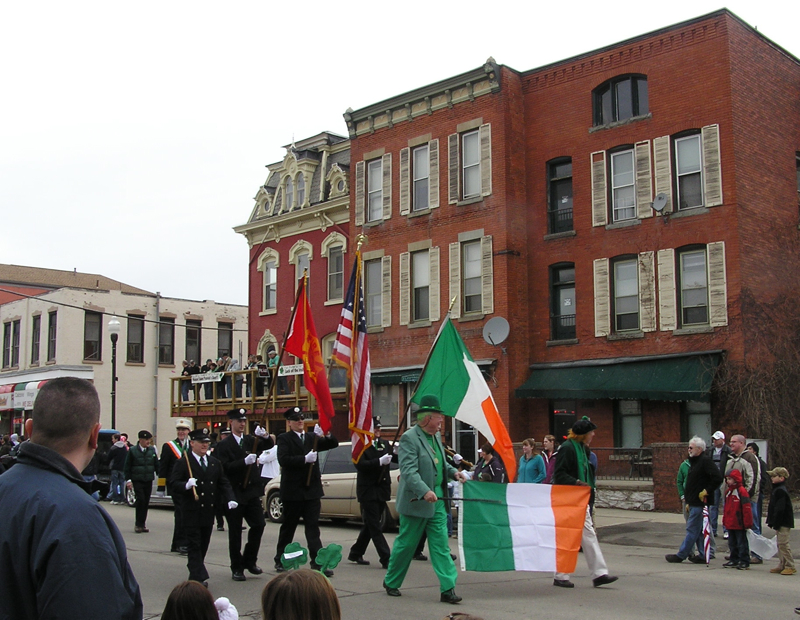
The 2011 Saint Patrick's Day parade in Hornell.

The City of Hornell was chartered in 1888 as the "City of Hornellsville," (having been first organized as the "Village of Hornellsville" in 1852). The name was changed to Hornell in 1906.

Major flooding in 1936 put parts of the city under water, prompting the creation of a system of levees to prevent future serious flooding issues.

The former city park, Union Park, was destroyed by the highway construction of the 1970s.

In 1950, Hornell had a population just above 15,000 people. It had two radio stations, WWHG and WLEA, and three movie theaters - the Steuben and the Majestic were located on Broadway, the Hornell on Main Street.

The current mayor of Hornell is Republican John Buckley.

The Hornell Armory, Hornell Public Library, Adsit House, Lincoln School, St. Ann's Federation Building, and United States Post Office are listed on the National Register of Historic Places.

== Railroads and Hornell ==
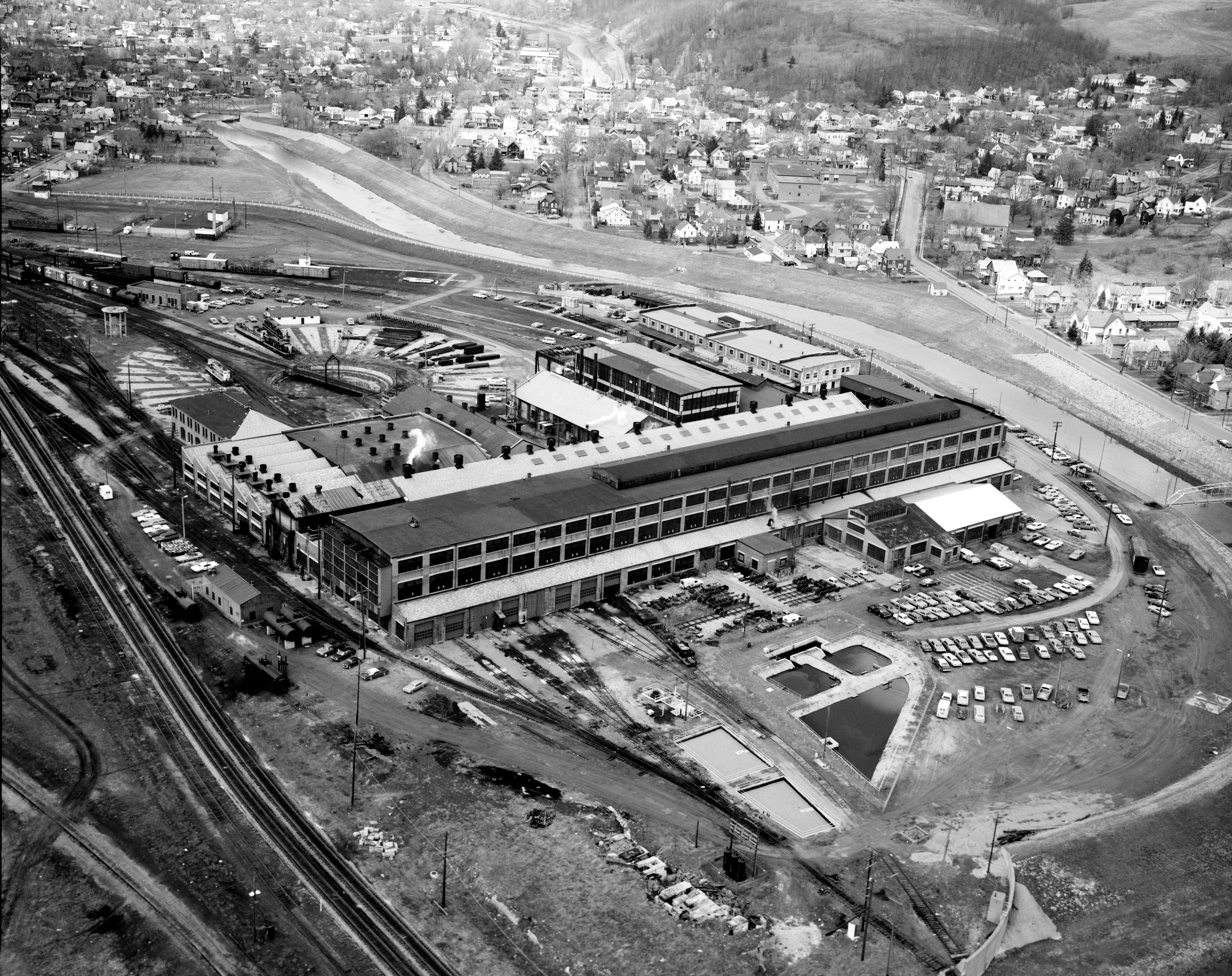
Former Erie Railway repair shop in Hornell. View is looking north towards downtown Hornell. Note the rotating train turntable and the Canisteo River. Photo from 1971.

Hornell had four rail lines, though the companies operating the railroads often changed names, routes, and ownership:

- The main Erie Railroad line, connecting New York City (terminal in Hoboken, New Jersey) and Dunkirk, New York.
- Erie's Buffalo line. This began as the Attica and Hornellsville Railroad (1845–1851), which became part of the Buffalo and New York City Railroad, which extended the line to Buffalo and operated it from 1852 to 1861, when it was acquired by Erie. Hornell was the junction and transfer point for the two main branches of the Erie.
- A line running to the northeast, from a separate depot on Seneca St. near Adsit, connecting Hornell via Wayland with Geneva. The company was the Geneva Southwestern and Hornellsville Railway (1872–1875), then the Geneva and Hornellsville Railway (1875–1876), and the Geneva, Hornellsville and Pine Creek Railway (1876–1879), and the Rochester, Hornellsville and Lackawanna Railroad (1886–1889), then the Delaware, Lackawanna, and Western, or Lackawanna for short. Later the Pittsburg, Shawmut and Northern Railroad ran on this route one train in each direction per day, connecting Hornell with Angelica to the west and Wayland to the north.
- The Hornellsville Electric Railway Company and Hornellsville & Canisteo Railway Company, consolidated in 1909 as the Hornell Traction Company, provided service to North Hornell, Canisteo, and within the city, linking the Lackawanna and Erie depots, from 1892 until 1926.

Some grading was done in 1872–1873 for a proposed but unbuilt Rochester, Hornellsville, and Pine Creek railroad.

The most important railroad in Hornell was the New York and Erie Railroad, or Erie for short. It arrived in Hornell in 1850 and began public service on May 14, 1851. President Millard Fillmore, himself a native of western New York, and Secretary of State Daniel Webster rode through Hornell on the inaugural train.

Hornell was a central location on the Erie, making it a favorable location for the railroad's repair yards. According to an 1882 traveler's guide to the Erie Railroad, in Hornell "There are an immense amount of side-tracks, ample engine-houses, repair-shops, and other railroad structures, as the village is the dividing-point of the Susquehanna and Western Divisions, and the point of junction of the Buffalo Division of the Erie Railway.... It has banks, newspapers, a nourishing library association, which maintains a course of popular lectures. There are churches of various denominations, and a population of about 9,000. The cars destined for Buffalo, Niagara Falls, etc., are here detached from those going west via Salamanca or Dunkirk. At the station is a spacious dining-saloon, where meals are served to travelers at regular hours."

In 1895 the Erie constructed "at the foot of Pine Street...an immense stock barn" for the large number of cattle being shipped east on its trains.

=== Hornell during the railroad period (1860–1960) ===
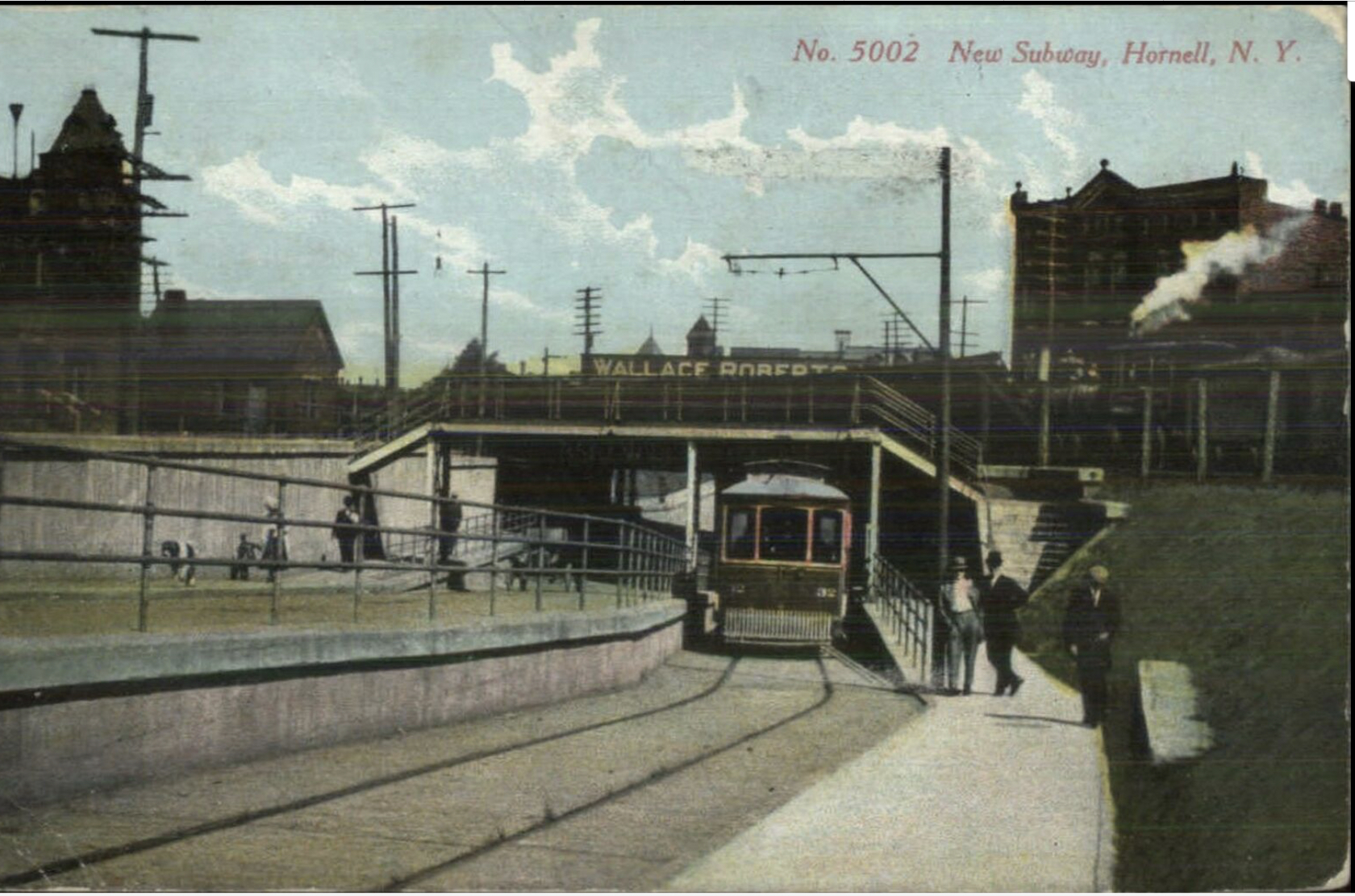
The Canisteo Street underpass of the Erie Railroad tracks, early 20th century. View is looking north towards downtown.

For the next hundred years Hornell enjoyed prosperity, with its steam engine shop doing the repairs for the entire Erie line. The most important point in town was the train station, which survives and since 2005 houses the Hornell Erie Depot Museum. Next to it were the police station and fire department, at the beginning of Broadway, a wide street with stores, a luncheonette, and the Steuben and Majestic Theaters. Heading south, Broadway ended at Canisteo Street just before it passed under the tracks, a route served for some decades by the Hornell Traction Company. The underpass was closed, save for a pedestrian passage, when the Route 36 arterial was built.

At the five-way intersection just north of the underpass, where Broadway began, Canisteo Street ran northwestward. Near its southern end (now covered by the Route 36 arterial), was Hornell's largest hotel, the New Sherwood, the offices of the Hornell Evening Tribune and above it those of its radio station WWHG. On the east side was a storefront Greyhound station (service Elmira – Corning – Bath – Hornell – Batavia – Buffalo, no direct service to Rochester); on the west side was Hornell's main park, Union Park, destroyed by the Hornell Arterial, with the city's high school (middle school after new high school built), containing the city's largest auditorium, and other businesses. Main Street, with the Hornell Theater, WLEA's studios, Koskie's music store, and other businesses, connected the two now-separated streets (Broadway and Canisteo/Seneca). Main St. extended east to Hornell's Carnegie Library (the Hornell Public Library), Hornell's largest grocery store, Loblaw's, the YMCA, with the only public swimming pool in the city, various medical and dental offices, and finally (turning south and crossing the Canisteo River), the Erie repair shops. North of Main Street the downtown area extended another block with the city's pharmacy, Jacobson's, a shoe store, the United States Post Office (all now [2009] vacant), and the Steuben Trust Company (bank). In the block north of Main Street, Church Street had Hornell's synagogue, Temple Beth-El (closed), and at the intersection with Genesee Street four churches, one on each corner; two survive today (2017). Further north on Seneca Street were Hornell's best restaurant, The Big Elms, Hornell's baseball field (from 1942 to 1957 Hornell had a minor-league team), and car dealers. The current high school is adjacent to the baseball field. The city ended at the Canisteo River, where a bridge led to the village of North Hornell.

Yet things were not idyllic in Hornell. In 1922, after a recruitment talk by "KKK organizer C. S. Fowler... at the local Grand Army of the Republic hall, the Klan announced its existence by igniting a huge cross on the side of a mountain, a demonstration evidently intended to intimidate the community's sizable immigrant population."

=== Hornell in the post-railroad period (1960–present) ===
Hornell has struggled to regain its former prosperity. The population is half what it was in 1960, and still declining. Passenger service, in severe decline, ended completely by 1970. (The former station has been refurbished and, since 2006, is the Hornell Erie Depot Museum.) The railroad came upon further hard times as trucking picked up more and more of the freight business. In October 1960, the Erie merged with the Lackawanna to form the Erie Lackawanna. Diesel engines, replacing older steam engines, required less maintenance; consequently, many of the staff were laid off. The Erie Accounting Office, in Hornell, was closed and its work transferred to the Lackawanna headquarters in Scranton, Pennsylvania. In 1972, flooding from Hurricane Agnes destroyed about 200 miles (320 km) of roadbed along the Canisteo River, removing all hope of reoperating the railroad line southeast of Hornell. The Erie Lackawanna filed for bankruptcy soon after.

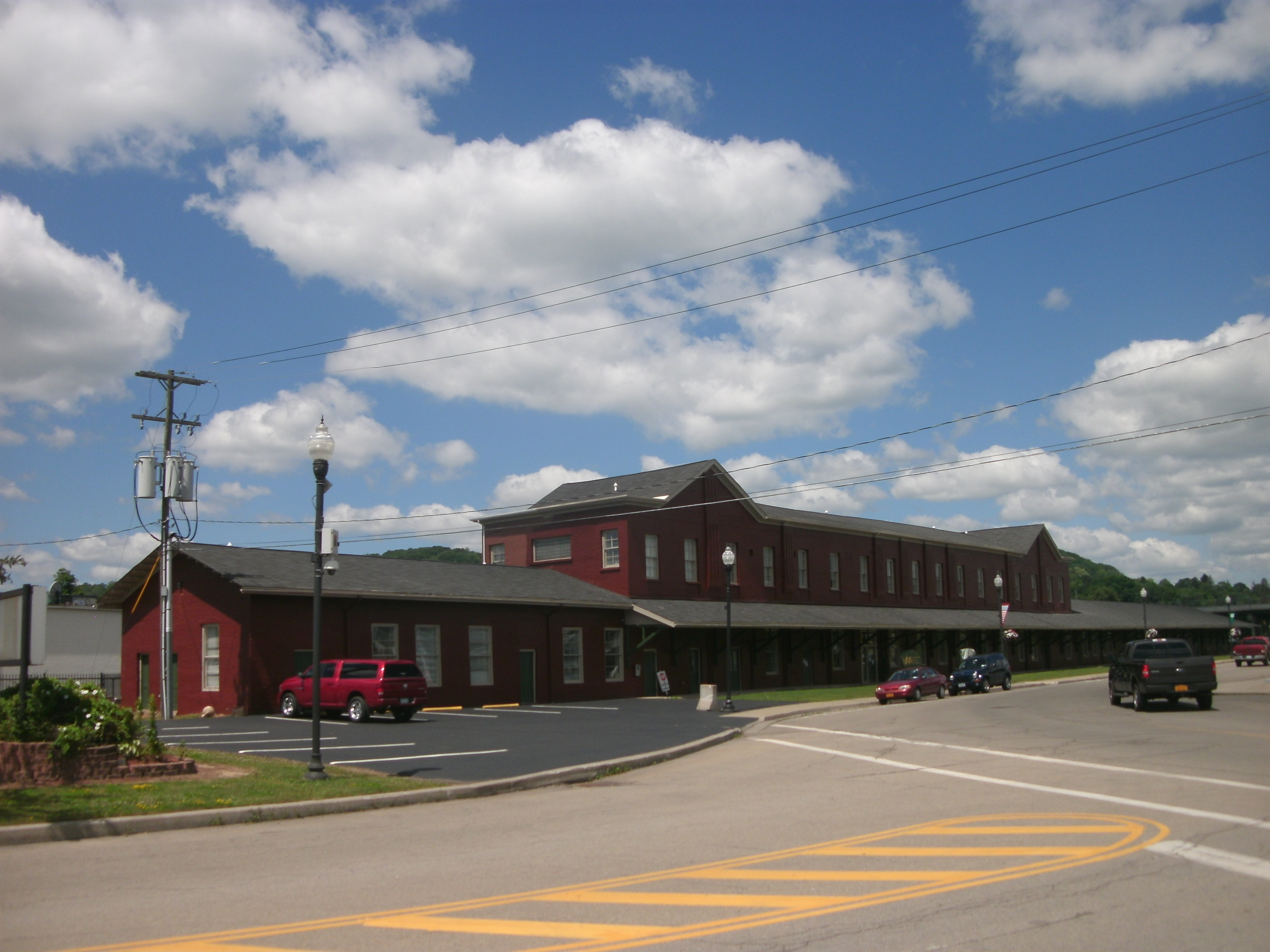
The Hornell Erie Depot Museum, photographed in July 2013

The former Erie repair shops were completely closed for years. They were later reopened to service EMD diesels and perform bodywork and painting. Yet later, they were operated by General Electric for a short time, followed by Morrison-Knudsen.

Today, the Hornell shops are a major employer, serving as Alstom's main North American assembly and manufacturing site, at which AC traction motors, railway cars, and passenger locomotives are produced. Car bodies are shipped disassembled from São Paulo, Brazil, and assembled in Hornell. Alstom won a contract worth $194 million to completely overhaul PATCO Speedline's light rail fleet, beginning in 2011. In 2013, the facility was contracted to build 34 light rail vehicles for OC Transpo. In 2020, the plant began production of Amtrak's second generation Acela high-speed trains. In January 2021, the plant won a $1.8bn contract to build new passenger railcars for Metra, which is expected to create 250 additional jobs.

== Highway construction ==
=== Route 36 Arterial ===
Hornell's central layout changed significantly when the New York Route 36 arterial was built about 1972. Prior to that, Route 36, Hornell's main north–south highway, was routed along Seneca Street (to the north) and Canisteo Street (to the south). Neither of these streets were adequate for the increased automobile and truck traffic which accompanied the decline of the railroad, and they could not be easily expanded. Canisteo Street also had a significant bottleneck (originally the "Canisteo Subway" on the Hornell-Canisteo trolley, pictured on a postcard, above) where the route went under the Erie Railroad tracks, just south of downtown. Route 36 between Hornell and Canisteo, also inadequate, could not be expanded due to the adjacent Canisteo River.

The decision was made to replace the route with an arterial, west of Seneca Street on the north side, crossing the downtown and exiting Hornell east of Canisteo Street on the south side. "The highway required the demolition of 245 houses and many commercial buildings, split the city in half, and sacrificed Hornell's Union Park." The four-lane route was continued to Canisteo. Unconnected fragments of the former Route 36 from Hornell to Canisteo survive; in Hornell it starts from East Avenue, east of the river, and heading north from the Village of Canisteo it is today Dineen/McBurney Road.

The impact of the relocation of Route 36 on central Hornell was profound. Much of the south end of the downtown was destroyed, either physically or economically. Seneca Street and Broadway, formerly important commercial streets, became deserted side streets. (See United States Post Office (Hornell, New York).) It is not fondly remembered, and it was something wanted by the trucking industry and its customers, not the local working class.

=== The Southern Tier Expressway (New York Route 17, now Interstate 86) ===
When the decision was made in the 1960s to upgrade the western portion of New York Route 17 to expressway status, it was decided to route the expressway through the Hornell area, as it was considered to have more prospects for development than Greenwood and Jasper, along the old route (now New York Route 417). Interstate 86 begins (or ends) in Pennsylvania, running from I-90 near Erie, Pennsylvania, across New York's Southern Tier to Windsor, NY. It crosses New York State Route 36 between Hornell and Arkport. It is today (2023) Hornell's main highway.

== Geography ==
Hornell is located at 42°19′N 77°40′W (42.3244, -77.6603). Hornell is at an altitude of 1,160 feet (350 meters) above sea level.

According to the United States Census Bureau, the city has a total area of 2.7 square miles (7.0 km^{2}), all land.

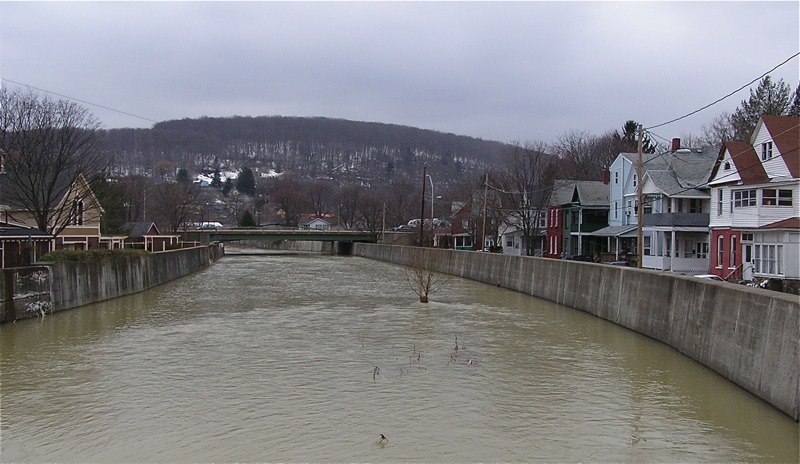
Canacadea Creek, a tributary of the Canisteo River in a residential neighborhood of Hornell.

Hornell is on the Canisteo River and surrounded by the foothills of the Allegheny Mountains.

== Demographics ==
Historical population
Census	Pop.	Note	%±
1870	4,552		—
1880	8,195		80.0%
1890	10,996		34.2%
1900	11,918		8.4%
1910	13,617		14.3%
1920	15,025		10.3%
1930	16,250		8.2%
1940	15,649		−3.7%
1950	15,049		−3.8%
1960	13,907		−7.6%
1970	12,144		−12.7%
1980	10,234		−15.7%
1990	9,877		−3.5%
2000	9,019		−8.7%
2010	8,563		−5.1%
2020	8,263		−3.5%
U.S. Decennial Census

=== 2020 census ===
As of the 2020 census, Hornell had a population of 8,263. The median age was 37.6 years. 23.3% of residents were under the age of 18 and 17.1% of residents were 65 years of age or older. For every 100 females there were 95.5 males, and for every 100 females age 18 and over there were 94.1 males age 18 and over.

100.0% of residents lived in urban areas, while 0.0% lived in rural areas.

There were 3,570 households in Hornell, of which 27.5% had children under the age of 18 living in them. Of all households, 33.7% were married-couple households, 23.1% were households with a male householder and no spouse or partner present, and 32.3% were households with a female householder and no spouse or partner present. About 37.3% of all households were made up of individuals and 14.4% had someone living alone who was 65 years of age or older.

There were 4,060 housing units, of which 12.1% were vacant. The homeowner vacancy rate was 1.8% and the rental vacancy rate was 10.1%.

Racial composition as of the 2020 census
Race	Number	Percent
White	7,171	86.8%
Black or African American	262	3.2%
American Indian and Alaska Native	21	0.3%
Asian	105	1.3%
Native Hawaiian and Other Pacific Islander	1	0.0%
Some other race	75	0.9%
Two or more races	628	7.6%
Hispanic or Latino (of any race)	257	3.1%

=== 2000 census ===
As of the 2000 census, there were 9,019 people, 3,596 households, and 2,218 families residing in the city. The population density was 3,309.0 inhabitants per square mile (1,277.6/km^{2}). There were 4,100 housing units at an average density of 1,504.2 per square mile (580.8/km^{2}). The racial makeup of the city was 95.73% White, 2.38% African American, 0.23% Native American, 0.57% Asian, 0.04% Pacific Islander, 0.38% from other races, and 0.67% from two or more races. Hispanic or Latino of any race were 1.29% of the population.

There were 3,596 households, out of which 32.4% had children under the age of 18 living with them, 40.9% were married couples living together, 16.1% had a female householder with no husband present, and 38.3% were non-families. 32.0% of all households were made up of individuals, and 14.3% had someone living alone who was 65 years of age or older. The average household size was 2.44 and the average family size was 3.07.

In the city, the population was spread out, with 27.7% under the age of 18, 9.7% from 18 to 24, 27.0% from 25 to 44, 19.7% from 45 to 64, and 16.0% who were 65 years of age or older. The median age was 35 years. For every 100 females, there were 89.0 males. For every 100 females age 18 and over, there were 82.9 males.

The median income for a household in the city was $28,184, and the median income for a family was $35,000. Males had a median income of $31,727 versus $18,854 for females. The per capita income for the city was $14,419. About 18.7% of families and 21.4% of the population were below the poverty line, including 32.1% of those under age 18 and 6.6% of those age 65 or over.

== Parks and recreation ==
There are several parks in the city of Hornell including:

- Maple City Park is adjacent to the Hornell High School and is maintained by both the school district and the city. It includes tennis courts, a baseball field, softball field, multiple half-basketball courts, a playground, a 6-lane rubber track, and a turf field (football and soccer). It is the home of the Hornell Dodgers NYCBL baseball team and the Hornell Red Raider athletic teams. Hornell's annual "Music Under the Stars" drum and bugle corps event also takes place on the turf field at this site. Prior to the construction of the high school, the park was the home of the minor league baseball team Hornell Dodgers (1942–1957).
- Veterans Memorial Park at James Street (formerly known as simply James St. Park) has many sports fields, pavilions, the city pool, and several playgrounds. Fourth of July celebrations, including fireworks, are located at this park.
- Michael C. Fucci Memorial Park at Shawmut is where the Hornell skate park is located. Many youth football and baseball games are also played on the fields. There was, at one time, an effort for Rails to Trails to create a bike/hike trail from this park northwestward.

== Education ==
There are four public schools and one private school in Hornell:

- Hornell High School (public, grades 7–12)
- Intermediate School (public, grades 3–6)
- North Hornell School (public, grades 3PreK–2): located in the village of North Hornell, but still part of the Hornell City School District
- Columbian School (public, Head Start): also location of administrative offices
- St. Ann's Academy (private, grades PreK–6): independent Catholic school that opened in 2012 after St. Ann's Catholic School (K–8) was closed by the Diocese of Rochester

The current Superintendent of Schools is Jeremy Polatti.

In June 2007, the Hornell Evening Tribune newspaper announced that a school planning committee is proposing a $100 million project to re-organize the schools and improve assessment results.

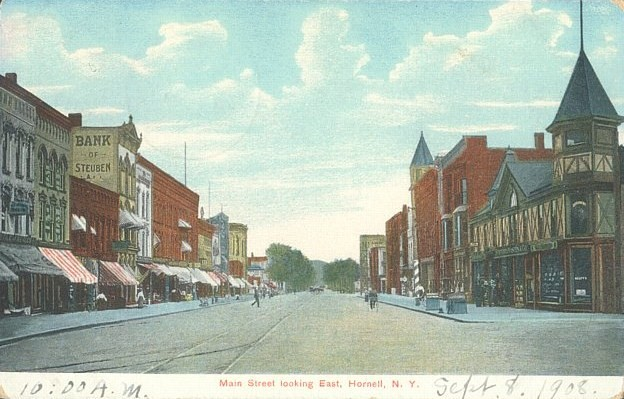
Main Street, looking east, 1908

== Transportation ==
Hornell is served by Hornell Area Transit buses.

New York State Route 21 conjoined with New York State Route 36 passes through the city, which is just south of the Southern Tier Expressway (Interstate 86 / New York State Route 17). County Roads 65, 68 and 109 also lead into the city.

The city is served by two railroads: it is on Norfolk Southern's Southern Tier Mainline and is the eastern terminus of the Western New York and Pennsylvania Railroad.

Hornell Municipal Airport (KHTF) is located a few miles north of the city on Route 36.

== Notable people ==
- John William Barber (1920–2007), jazz tubist
- Gene Burns (1940–2013), talk radio host
- Bob Crane (1928–1978), Radio Broadcaster WLEA
- Bill Dugan (born 1959), professional football player
- Frank Kelly Freas (1922–2005), science fiction artist
- John Keel (1930–2009), author
- Bob Morton (1934–2015), Washington state legislator
- Thomas Murphy (1915–2006), CEO of General Motors (1974–1980)
- Thom McDaniels (born 1949), former high school football coach
- Bill Pullman (born 1953), actor
- Vice Adm. Lyndon Spencer (1898–1981), U.S. Coast Guard officer
- M. Louise Stowell (1861–1930) artist
- Mike Waufle (born 1954), professional football coach
- James A. Wetmore (1863–1940), US acting Supervising Architect

== Media ==
Print

- The Evening Tribune

Radio

- WLEA - AM 1480
- WCKR - FM 92.1
- WKPQ - FM 105.3
- WWHG (defunct)
- WHHO (defunct)

== See also ==
- Glenwood Inn (Hornellsville, New York)
- Hornell Traction Company
- Hornell Raceway
