= Steuben County, New York =

County in New York, United States

- County
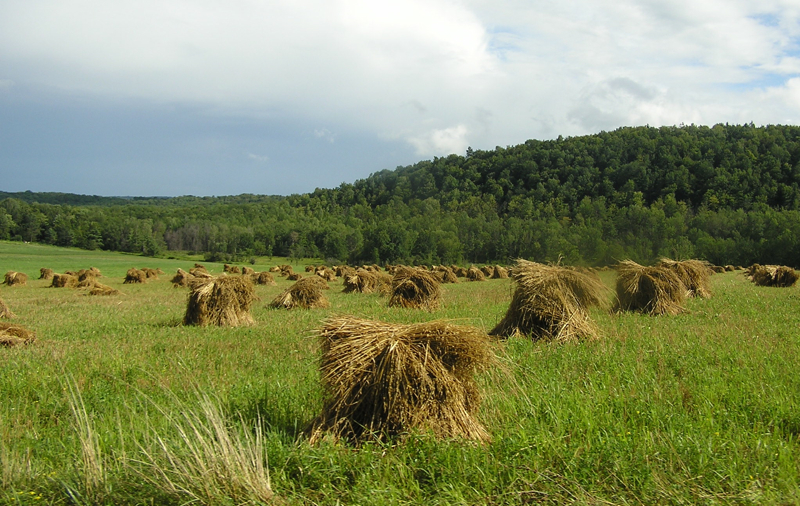
- Farmland in rural Steuben County

- Seal

- Location within the U.S. state of New York
- Coordinates: 42°16′N 77°23′W
- Country: United States
- State: New York
- Founded: 1796
- Named for: Baron von Steuben
- Seat: Bath
- Largest city: Corning

Area
  - Total: 1,404 sq mi (3,640 km^{2})
  - Land: 1,391 sq mi (3,600 km^{2})
  - Water: 14 sq mi (36 km^{2}) 1.0%

Population (2020)
  - Total: 93,584
  - Estimate (2025): 91,855 ▼
  - Density: 66/sq mi (25/km^{2})
- Time zone: UTC−5 (Eastern)
  - Summer (DST): UTC−4 (EDT)
- Congressional districts: 23rd, 24th
- Website: www.steubencountyny.gov

Steuben County (/ˈstjuːbən/ STEW-bən or /stjuːˈbɛn/ stew-BEN) is a county located in the U.S. state of New York. As of the 2020 census, its population was 93,584. Its county seat is Bath. Its name is in honor of Baron von Steuben, a Prussian general who fought on the American side in the American Revolutionary War, though it is not pronounced the same (German: [fɔn ˈʃtɔʏbn̩]). The county is part of the Southern Tier region of the state.

Steuben County comprises the Corning, NY micropolitan statistical area, which is also included in the Elmira-Corning, NY combined statistical area.

== History ==
Ontario County was established in 1789 to govern lands the state of New York had acquired in the Phelps and Gorham Purchase; at the time, it covered the entirety of Western New York. Steuben County, much larger than today, was split off from Ontario County on March 8, 1796. In 1823, a portion of Steuben County was combined with a portion of Ontario County to form Yates County. Steuben County was further reduced in size on April 17, 1854, when a portion was combined with portions of Chemung and Tompkins Counties to form Schuyler County.

In its earliest years, Steuben County was demographically and geographically linked to the Susquehanna River basin in Pennsylvania, leading to the port of Baltimore. The Canisteo River, navigable as far as Arkport, emptied into the Chemung River and it into the Susquehanna. No natural barriers, such as the Cohoes Falls on the Mohawk, existed to impede transportation, and timber and other agricultural products were easily shipped downriver from what are the towns of Addison, Canisteo, and Hornellsville. Prior to the opening of the Erie Canal in 1825, followed by the railroads, communication with the Hudson Valley and New York City was difficult. Limited to horses, mules, and donkeys, using it to ship bulky agricultural products was far too expensive.

In 1892, a bill was introduced in the legislature to split Steuben County, with Canisteo, Corning, and "the south towns" becoming Lincoln County. It did not pass.

== Geography ==
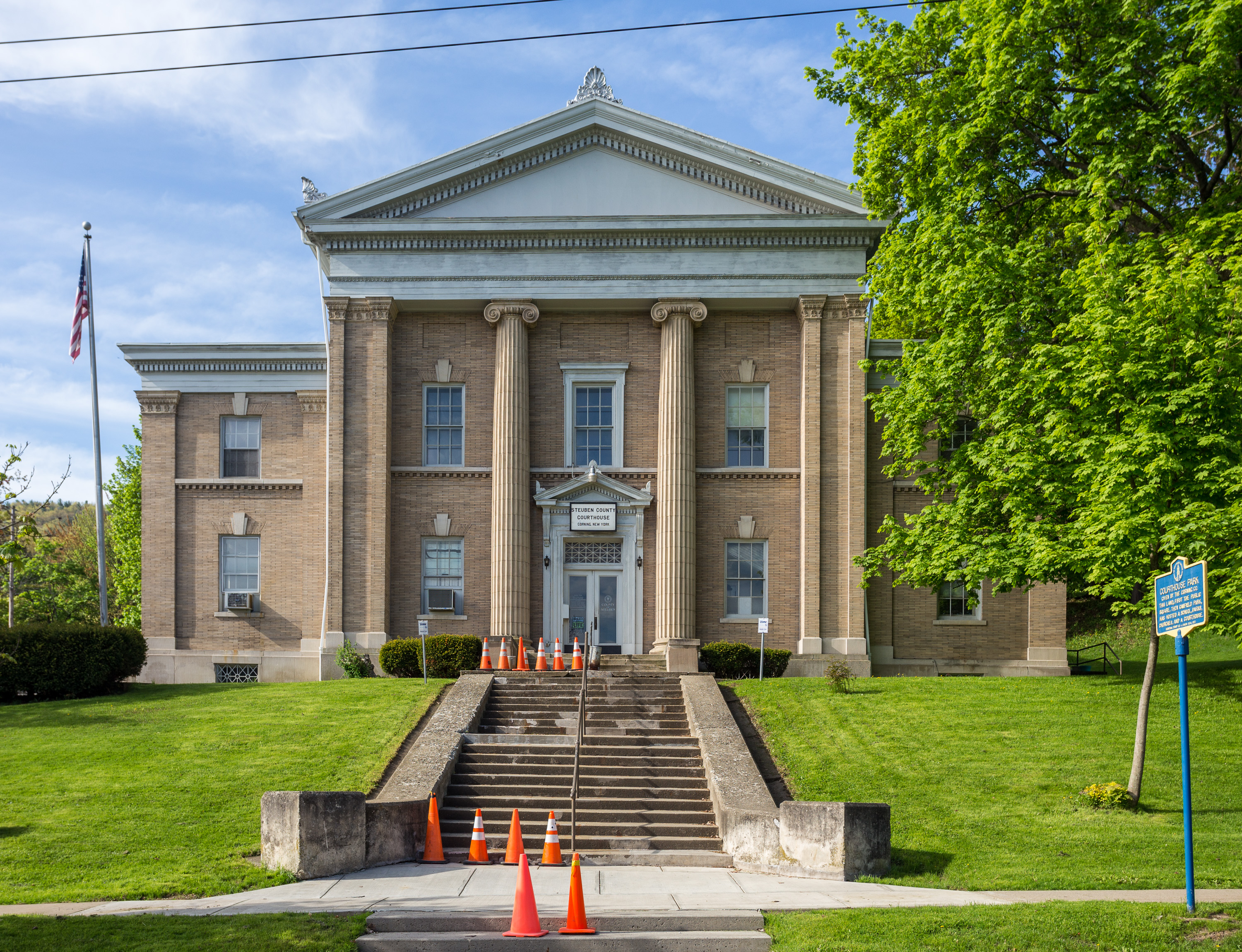
Former Steuben County Courthouse in Corning

According to the U.S. Census Bureau, the county has a total area of 1,404 square miles (3,640 km^{2}), of which 14 square miles (36 km^{2}) (1.0%) are covered by water.

Steuben County is in the southwestern part of New York, immediately north of the Pennsylvania border. The population of Steuben County according to the 2000 U. S. census was 98,726. The county is in the Southern Tier region of New York.

=== Adjacent counties ===
- Ontario County - north
- Yates County - northeast
- Schuyler County - east
- Chemung County - east
- Tioga County, Pennsylvania - south
- Potter County, Pennsylvania - southwest
- Allegany County - west
- Livingston County - northwest

== Government and politics ==
Steuben County is governed by a 17-member legislature headed by a chairman.

=== State and federal government ===
Steuben County is a Republican stronghold in national elections. The last Democrat to carry the county was Lyndon Johnson in his 1964 landslide.

United States presidential election results for Steuben County, New York
Year	Republican		Democratic		Third party(ies)	
Year	No.	%	No.	%	No.	%
1884	10,048	48.78%	9,060	43.98%	1,491	7.24%
1888	11,637	53.10%	9,154	41.77%	1,126	5.14%
1892	10,577	50.61%	8,307	39.74%	2,017	9.65%
1896	12,858	59.47%	7,971	36.87%	793	3.67%
1900	12,411	55.51%	8,872	39.68%	1,076	4.81%
1904	12,680	59.66%	7,364	34.65%	1,209	5.69%
1908	12,313	56.33%	8,366	38.27%	1,180	5.40%
1912	5,986	31.54%	7,396	38.97%	5,598	29.49%
1916	10,424	53.99%	8,032	41.60%	852	4.41%
1920	18,335	65.79%	7,401	26.56%	2,132	7.65%
1924	21,481	66.79%	7,194	22.37%	3,485	10.84%
1928	28,028	69.26%	10,699	26.44%	1,739	4.30%
1932	22,986	62.19%	13,219	35.77%	754	2.04%
1936	24,987	61.23%	14,978	36.70%	845	2.07%
1940	27,587	65.12%	14,651	34.58%	127	0.30%
1944	25,538	65.36%	13,461	34.45%	73	0.19%
1948	22,938	62.44%	12,895	35.10%	903	2.46%
1952	32,123	74.14%	11,154	25.74%	49	0.11%
1956	33,902	78.22%	9,440	21.78%	0	0.00%
1960	29,638	68.06%	13,898	31.91%	13	0.03%
1964	15,988	39.34%	24,634	60.61%	23	0.06%
1968	24,189	62.52%	12,229	31.61%	2,272	5.87%
1972	28,708	75.05%	9,462	24.74%	83	0.22%
1976	23,164	60.93%	14,685	38.63%	166	0.44%
1980	22,418	58.73%	12,826	33.60%	2,926	7.67%
1984	28,848	73.19%	10,471	26.56%	98	0.25%
1988	25,359	65.93%	12,824	33.34%	283	0.74%
1992	19,761	47.72%	12,043	29.08%	9,606	23.20%
1996	17,710	46.40%	14,481	37.94%	5,980	15.67%
2000	24,200	59.66%	14,600	35.99%	1,763	4.35%
2004	26,980	63.81%	14,523	34.35%	781	1.85%
2008	24,203	57.75%	17,148	40.92%	560	1.34%
2012	21,954	56.98%	15,787	40.97%	790	2.05%
2016	26,831	63.88%	12,526	29.82%	2,645	6.30%
2020	29,474	63.83%	15,790	34.19%	915	1.98%
2024	29,777	65.34%	15,413	33.82%	385	0.84%

Office	District	Area of the county	Officeholder	Party	First took office	Residence
U.S. Representative	New York's 23rd congressional district	All	Nicholas Langworthy	Republican	2022	Pendleton, Niagara County
State Senator	58th State Senate District	All	Thomas F. O'Mara	Republican	2011	Big Flats, Chemung County
State Assemblyman	132nd State Assembly District	All of the county not covered by the 133rd and 148th assembly districts	Philip A. Palmesano	Republican	2011	Corning, Steuben County
State Assemblyman	133rd State Assembly District	The north and northwest parts of the county (towns of Dansville, Cohocton, Hornellsville, Prattsburgh, Wayland)	Vacant			
State Assemblyman	148th State Assembly District	The southwest corner of the county (towns of Greenwood, Jasper, Troupsburg, West Union)	Joseph M. Giglio	Republican	2005	Gowanda, Cattaraugus County

Steuben County is part of:

- The 7th Judicial District of the New York Supreme Court
- The 4th Department of the New York Supreme Court, Appellate Division

== Demographics ==
Historical population
Census	Pop.	Note	%±
1800	1,788		—
1810	7,246		305.3%
1820	21,989		203.5%
1830	33,851		53.9%
1840	46,138		36.3%
1850	63,771		38.2%
1860	66,690		4.6%
1870	67,717		1.5%
1880	77,586		14.6%
1890	81,473		5.0%
1900	82,822		1.7%
1910	83,362		0.7%
1920	80,627		−3.3%
1930	82,671		2.5%
1940	84,927		2.7%
1950	91,439		7.7%
1960	97,691		6.8%
1970	99,546		1.9%
1980	99,217		−0.3%
1990	99,088		−0.1%
2000	98,726		−0.4%
2010	98,990		0.3%
2020	93,584		−5.5%
2025 (est.)	91,855	▼	−1.8%
U.S. Decennial Census; 1790-1960 1900-1990; 1990-2000 2010-2020

=== 2020 census ===
Steuben County, New York – Racial and ethnic composition Note: the US Census treats Hispanic/Latino as an ethnic category. This table excludes Latinos from the racial categories and assigns them to a separate category. Hispanics/Latinos may be of any race.
Race / Ethnicity (NH = Non-Hispanic)	Pop 1980	Pop 1990	Pop 2000	Pop 2010	Pop 2020	% 1980	% 1990	% 2000	% 2010	% 2020
White alone (NH)	97,341	96,638	94,689	93,476	84,338	98.11%	97.53%	95.91%	94.43%	90.12%
Black or African American alone (NH)	882	1,135	1,329	1,487	1,416	0.89%	1.15%	1.35%	1.50%	1.51%
Native American or Alaska Native alone (NH)	142	197	240	193	203	0.14%	0.20%	0.24%	0.19%	0.22%
Asian alone (NH)	321	540	889	1,151	1,616	0.32%	0.54%	0.90%	1.16%	1.73%
Native Hawaiian or Pacific Islander alone (NH)	x	x	15	14	12	x	x	0.02%	0.01%	0.01%
Other race alone (NH)	146	60	48	66	301	0.15%	0.06%	0.05%	0.07%	0.32%
Multiracial (NH)	x	x	720	1,232	3,980	x	x	0.73%	1.24%	4.25%
Hispanic or Latino (any race)	385	518	796	1,371	1,718	0.39%	0.52%	0.81%	1.38%	1.84%
Total	99,217	99,088	98,726	98,990	93,584	100.00%	100.00%	100.00%	100.00%	100.00%

=== 2000 census ===
As of the census of 2000, 98,726 people, 39,071 households, and 26,216 families were residing in the county. The population density was 71 people per square mile (27 people/km^{2}). The 46,132 housing units had an average density of 33 units per square mile (13/km^{2}). The racial makeup of the county was 96.43% White, 1.36% African American, 0.27% Native American, 0.90% Asian, 0.02% Pacific Islander, 0.21% from other races, and 0.81% from two or more races. Hispanic or Latino of any race were 0.81% of the population. About 18.6% were of German, 15.2% English, 14.4% American, 13.6% Irish, and 8.3% Italian ancestry according to Census 2000; 96.5% spoke English and 1.3% Spanish as their first language.

Of the 39,071 households, 31.8% had children under 18 living with them, 51.7% were married couples living together, 10.6% had a female householder with no husband present, and 32.9% were not families. About 27.2% of all households were made up of individuals, and 11.9% had someone living alone who was 65 or older. The average household size was 2.49 and the average family size was 3.01.

In the county, the age distribution was 26.0% under 18, 7.40 from 18 to 24, 27.2% from 25 to 44, 24.2% from 45 to 64, and 15.2% who were 65 or older. The median age was 38 years. For every 100 females, there were 96.0 males. For every 100 females 18 and over, there were 93.2 males.

The median income for a household in the county was $35,479 and for a family was $41,940. Males had a median income of $32,155 versus $24,163 for females. The per capita income for the county was $18,197. About 9.9% of families and 13.2% of the population were below the poverty line, including 18.7% of those under 18 and 5.8% of those 65 or over.

== Industry ==
The largest employer in Steuben County is Corning, Inc. (formerly Corning Glass Works), the world headquarters of a large firm (34,000 employed worldwide), which manufactures specialty glass and related products. Related is the nearby Corning Museum of Glass. A wine industry is in Hammondsport, also the headquarters of the Mercury Corporation, a custom manufacturer, formerly of aircraft and aircraft components, and a museum of aviation, the Glenn H. Curtiss Museum, is in Hammondsport. Former industries in Steuben County are the Steuben Glass Works, in Corning, now part of Corning Glass Works, and the Erie Railroad repair shops, in Hornell.

== Education ==
The one institution of postsecondary education in Steuben County is Corning Community College. Alfred University and Elmira College are nearby.

School districts partially or entirely in the county include:

- Addison Central School District
- Alfred-Almond Central School District (portion)
- Andover Central School District
- Arkport Central School District
- Avoca Central School District
- Bath Central School District
- Bradford Central School District
- Canaseraga Central School District (portion)
- Campbell-Savona Central School District
- Canisteo-Greenwood Central School District
- Corning City School District
- Dansville Central School District
- Elmira City School District (portion)
- Hammondsport Central School District
- Hornell City School District
- Jasper-Troupsburg Central School District
- Naples Central School District (portion)
- Penn Yan Central School District (portion)
- Prattsburgh Central School District
- Wayland-Cohocton Central School District
- Whitesville Central School District (portion)

== Healthcare ==
Steuben County is home to multiple hospitals. The Western region of Steuben County is served by UR Medicine St James Hospital in Hornell, New York. The mid/central region of the county is served by Ira Davenport Memorial Hospital in Bath, New York. The east region of the county is served by the Southern Tier's Level III Trauma Center Guthrie Corning Hospital in Corning, New York. Veterans in Steuben County and surrounding counties get their healthcare at the Bath VA Medical Center. The northern region of the county is served by hospitals not in the county, like UR Medicine Noyes Health in Dansville, New York and Soldiers and Sailors Memorial Hospital in Penn Yan, New York.

== Transportation ==
=== Major highways ===
- Interstate 86 (Southern Tier Expressway)
- New York State Route 17 (Southern Tier Expressway)
- Interstate 99
- U.S. Route 15
- Interstate 390
- New York State Route 15
- New York State Route 21
- New York State Route 36
- New York State Route 414
- New York State Route 415
- New York State Route 417

=== Airports ===
Steuben County contains the following public-use airports:

- Corning-Painted Post Airport in the town of Erwin, near Corning and Painted Post
- Hornell Municipal Airport in the city of Hornell

=== Public transportation ===
Local bus service is provided by Hornell Area Transit.

== Communities ==
=== Larger settlements ===
#	Location	Population	Type	Area
1	Corning	11,183	City	Southeast
2	Hornell	8,563	City	West
3	†Bath	5,786	Village	Northeast
4	Gang Mills	4,185	CDP	Southeast
5	Canisteo	2,270	Village	West
6	Wayland	1,865	Village	Northwest
7	Painted Post	1,809	Village	Southeast
8	Addison	1,763	Village	Southeast
9	South Corning	1,145	Village	Southeast
10	Avoca	946	Village	Northwest
11	Arkport	844	Village	West
12	Cohocton	838	Village	Northwest
13	Savona	827	Village	Northeast
14	North Hornell	778	Village	West
15	Campbell	713	CDP	Southeast
16	Hammondsport	661	Village	Northeast
17	††Prattsburgh	656	CDP	Northeast
18	Coopers Plains	598	CDP	Southeast
19	Riverside	497	Village	Southeast
20	‡Almond	466	Village	West

† - County seat

†† - Former village

‡ - Not wholly in this county

=== Towns ===
- Addison
- Avoca
- Bath
- Bradford
- Cameron
- Campbell
- Canisteo
- Caton
- Cohocton
- Corning
- Dansville
- Erwin
- Fremont
- Greenwood
- Hartsville
- Hornby
- Hornellsville
- Howard
- Jasper
- Lindley
- Prattsburgh
- Pulteney
- Rathbone
- Thurston
- Troupsburg
- Tuscarora
- Urbana
- Wayland
- Wayne
- West Union
- Wheeler
- Woodhull

=== Hamlets ===
- Adrian
- Canisteo Center
- Gibson
- Perkinsville
- South Hornell
- South Canisteo

== Notable people ==
People born in Steuben County:

- Stanley C. Armstrong (1888–1950), politician
- Josiah H. Bonney (1817–1887), politician
- Olive Byrne (1904–1990), domestic partner
- Edward Conner (1829–1900), republican
- Glenn H. Curtiss (1878–1930), aviation pioneer
- Joseph James DeAngelo (born 1945), serial killer
- Jasper Humphrey (1812–1892), Democratic member of the Wisconsin State Assembly
- Artemas Martin (1835–1918), mathematician
- Selwyn N. Owen (1836–1916), lawyer
- James A. Parsons (c.1868–1945), politician
- Omar L. Rosenkrans (1843–1926), republican
- Eric M. Smith (born 1980), juvenile murderer
- Peter Truax (1828–1909), philanthropist

== See also ==
- Steuben County Transit System
- List of counties in New York
- National Register of Historic Places listings in Steuben County, New York
