= Canisteo =

Canisteo may refer to:

== Places in the United States ==
- Canisteo (town), New York, in Steuben County
- Canisteo (village), New York, in Steuben County
- Canisteo River, a tributary of the Tioga River in New York
- Canisteo Township, Minnesota, in Dodge County

== Other ==
- Canisteo Peninsula, Antarctica
- USS Canisteo (AO-99), US Navy ship
