= South Canisteo, New York =

- Hamlet
- Location within New York Location within the United States
- Coordinates: 42°19′33″N 77°55′00″W
- Country: United States
- State: New York
- County: Steuben
- Elevation: 1,470 ft (450 m)
- Time zone: UTC-5 (Eastern (EST))
  - Summer (DST): UTC-4 (EDT)
- ZIP code: 14823
- Area code: 607

South Canisteo is a hamlet in the Town of Canisteo, approximately 6 miles (9.7 km) southeast of the Village of Canisteo. It is located on New York Route 36 at its intersection with Steuben County route 21 (South Canisteo–Rathbone Road), Hog Back Road, and Steuben County route 31.

It is on Colonel Bills Creek, which empties into the Canisteo River at Canisteo Center.

South Canisteo previously had a post office, and a cheese and butter factory (creamery).
