= New York & Pennsylvania Railroad =

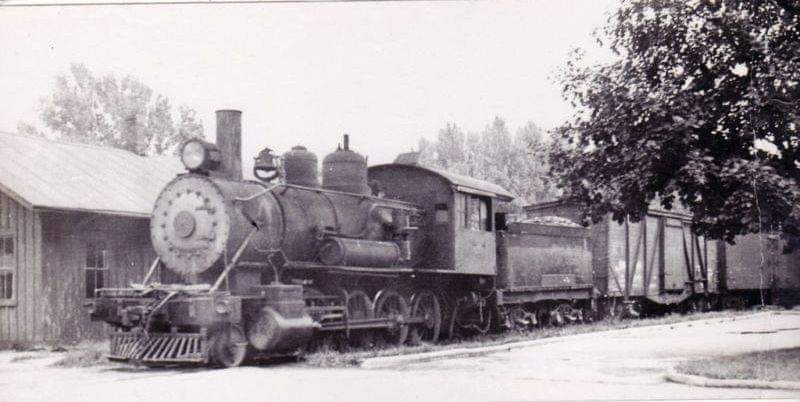

Overview
- Status: Defunct
- Owner: Theodore Cobb and Sons
- Termini: Canisteo (village), New York; Ceres, New York
- Stations: 5 (Canisteo, Greenwood, Genesee, Oswayo, Shinglehouse) Possibly Rexville, McGraws, Whitesville, Ellisburg, and others.

Service
- Services: 1
- Depot(s): Canisteo, New York
- Rolling stock: 6 locomotives, 2 passenger coaches, 30 flat cars, 2 cabooses

History
- Work began: 1892
- Opened: 1894
- Completed: 1903
- 1916–1920: Suspension of service in New York state because of flood damage.
- 1935: Damage from flood of 1935 direct cause of shutdown.
- Closed: 1935

Technical
- Line length: 90.33 km (56.13 mi)
- Character: Passenger and freight, 1894–1917; freight only, 1917–1935
- Track gauge: 4 ft 8 1/2 in (1,435 mm) standard gauge
- Operating speed: 30 mph (48 km/h)

The New York & Pennsylvania Railroad (NYP) was a single track, shortline railroad running on a route described as east—west in the company's timetables, but closer to an arc: almost due south along Bennett's Creek from Canisteo through the hamlets of Greenwood, Rexville, and Whitesville, New York, southwest through Genesee, Pennsylvania to Oswayo, Pennsylvania, then northwest through Shinglehouse, Pennsylvania to Ceres, New York. In Canisteo trains made "a close connection" with "electric cars for Hornellsville". Trains connected in Canisteo with the Erie Railroad, with service to Buffalo and New York City; in Genesee with the Buffalo and Susquehanna Railroad, with service to Wellsville, New York, and in Ceres with the Pittsburg [sic], Shawmutt, and Northern Railroad, with service to Olean, New York, and points west. While the railroad did not serve Hornell, occasionally it did run special trains, using the Erie tracks. Its route was primarily in southwestern Steuben County, New York, and northern Potter County, Pennsylvania, with small portions in Allegany County, New York, and McKean County, Pennsylvania. Total track was 56.13 miles (90.33 km) main line and 7.69 miles (12.38 km) of sidings.

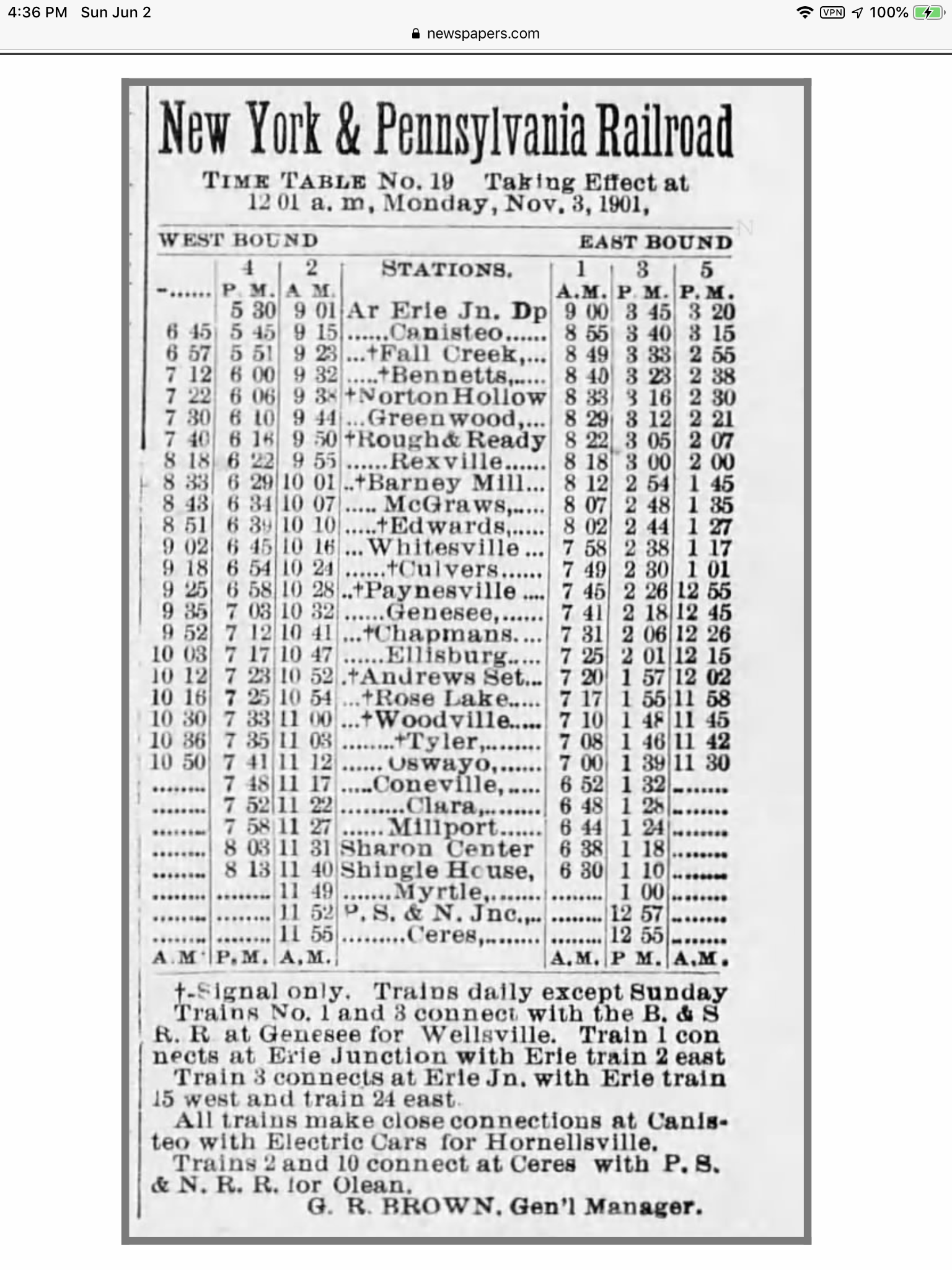
New York & Pennsylvania Railroad timetable, 1901

== The unbuilt Rochester, Hornellsville, and Pine Creek Railroad ==
Between Canisteo and Rexville the New York & Pennsylvania used the grading done in 1872–1873 for the unbuilt and scandal-ridden Rochester, Hornellsville, and Pine Creek Railroad (RHP). Construction of that railroad came to a halt at the Panic of 1873.

As far as Genesee, the route of the NYP is the same as that planned for the RHP. The NYP wanted to extend to Hornellsville using the roadbed of the RHP, but did not do so because the builders found unattractive the terms offered by the owner of it.

== Construction ==
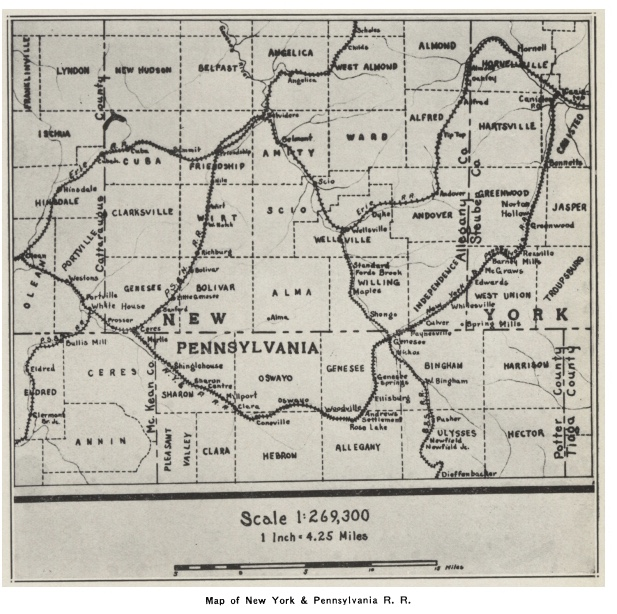
Map showing route of New York & Pennsylvania Railroad

The line was built in segments. The first section built was from Oswayo east to Genesee. The company was at that time the Olean, Oswayo, and Eastern Railway Company, incorporated in 1892. Service began in 1893. The line merged with the New York and Pennsylvania Railway [sic] Company, incorporated in 1895, extending service in 1896 northeastward to its junction with the Erie Railroad on the north side of Canisteo, New York. After a merger in 1904 with the Ceres and Olean Railway (incorporated 1901), service northwestward to Ceres, New York, began. Also in 1894, the line was given its final name.

A 1911 timetable shows two first-class and one second-class (involving transfers in Oswayo and Shinglehouse) trains in each direction each day. Between Shinglehouse and Ceres there were only one first-class and one second-class train in each direction each day. The schedule also reveals that speeds were rarely above 30 miles per hour (48 km/h). At Ceres the entire train had to be turned around, using a wye turnaround.

The railroad served a territory which was a beehive of industry in the early years of its existence, with sawmills, tanneries, barrel header and stave factories, grist mills, planing mills, "large deposits of glass rock" (quartz) with a high percentage of silica, natural gas, and a prosperous, diversified agricultural region. A windowglass factory covered 9 acres (3.6 ha), employed 300 men and was said to be the largest of its kind in the country.

At its peak it owned 6 locomotives, 2 passenger coaches, 30 flat cars, and 2 cabooses.

== Canisteo ==
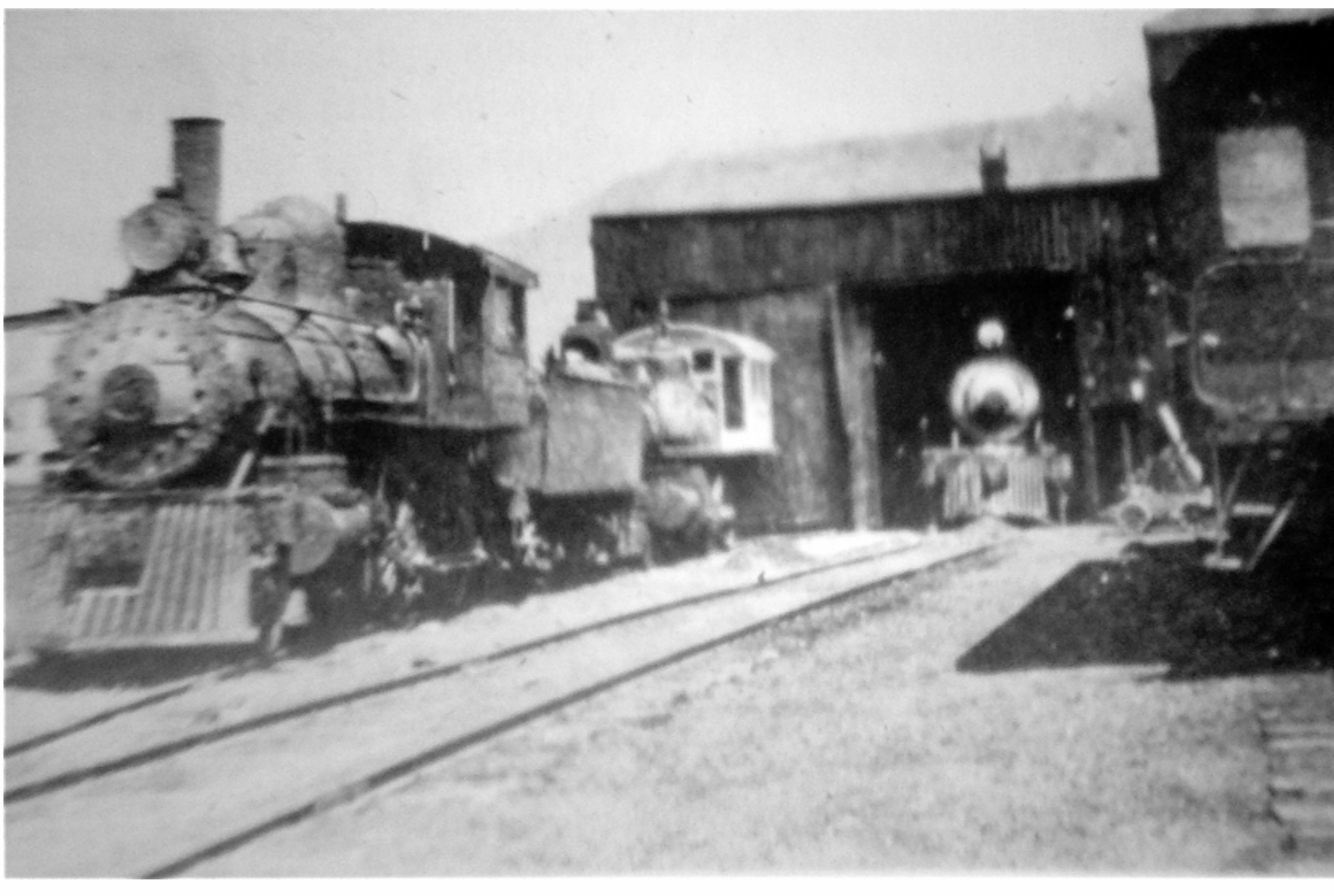
New York & Pennsylvania Railroad Engine House, between 2nd and 3rd Streets in Canisteo

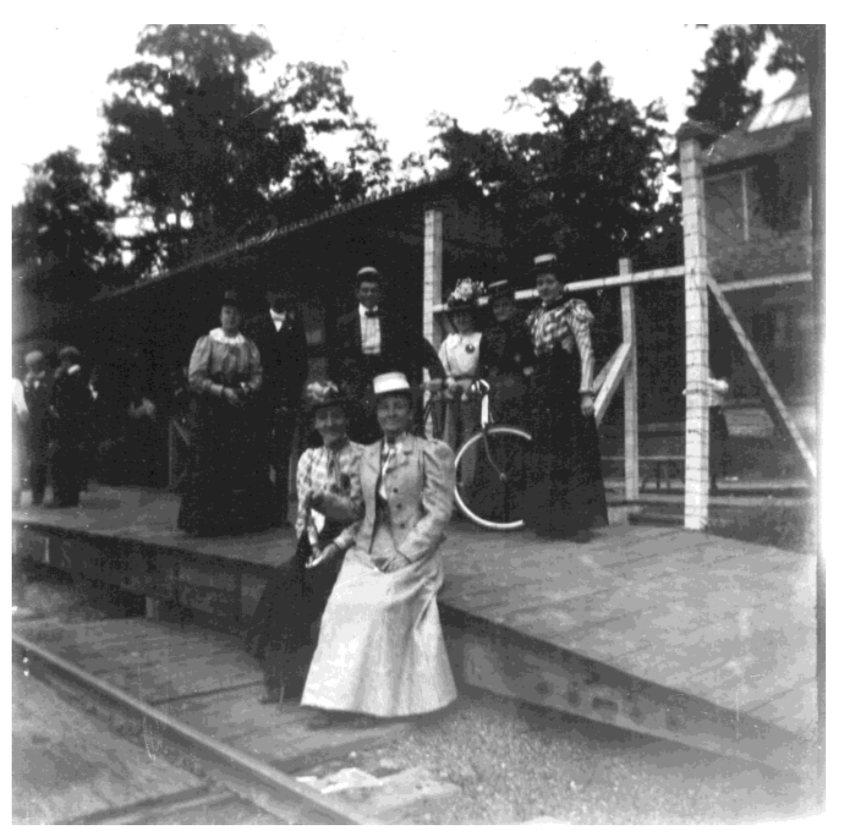
Academy Street platform, New York & Pennsylvania Railroad

Starting in 1896, the company's offices were in Canisteo, the eastern end of the line. (Actually the end was at the Erie Railroad depot, just north of Canisteo.) Besides the Erie Railroad stop and the main stop in downtown Canisteo, the railroad had a third stop in Canisteo, at Academy Street, for use by students of Canisteo Academy, who came from as far as Pennsylvania, spending the week at boarding houses, and returning home on weekends. According to the 1897 Sanford Fire Insurance Map, the route in the village of Canisteo was from the Erie line south, then NW to SE across Depot St., just north of the Taylor Chair factory and the Pearl Button Works. Then came its garage and storage yard (tracks). There were 8 short spur lines to various businesses. The route turned south, and crossed Main Street (now East Main Street) just east of the Fire Department. The station and company offices were just south of Main Street. Remains of freight facilities are on each side of the route north and south of 5th Street. The route then turned slightly to the southeast, as does today's South Elm St., and then stopped at the Academy Street platform. According to two timetables, 15 minutes were used in traversing the 0.6 miles (0.97 km) between the Erie Depot and the Academy Street stations, so the train went through the village at 2.4 miles per hour (3.9 km/h), a walking pace.

== Decline ==
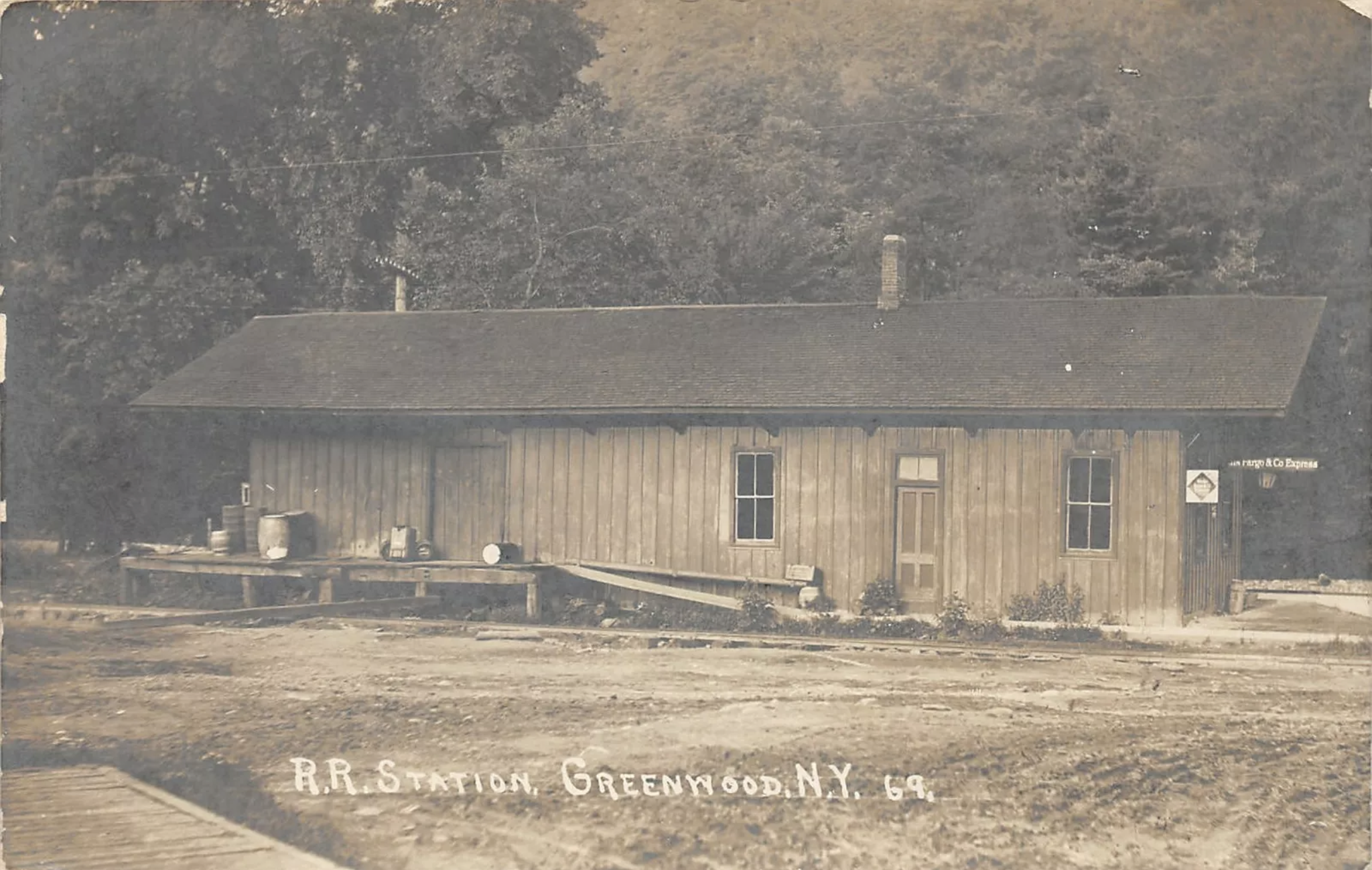
New York & Pennsylvania Railroad station in Greenwood, New York. Note Wells Fargo sign. 1920?

The exhausting of timber, the decline of the lumber industry, and the consequent decline in population, were key factors in the line's demise. Revenue no longer covered operating expenses, but service was maintained, with two passenger trains each day, down to the close of this period, though the resources of the road did not admit of keeping it in very good shape.

There was a bad fire in Genesee in April 1898, destroying part of the village. The plant of the Penn Tanning Company at Oswayo burned in January 1903 and was not rebuilt, and the tannery at Shinglehouse closed in that year. In 1907 the sand–lime brick works at Genesee went into bankruptcy and closed. In 1909 the Palmer Window Glass Company at Shinglehouse closed. The Empire Window Glass Company, the Elk Flint Bottle Company, and the Wolcott Gasoline factory also closed. A disastrous fire in Shinglehouse in March 1909 destroyed hotels and stores in the business district. The railroad depot at Genesee burned in 1912 and was not replaced, an old passenger coach serving as a station. The heading mill in Oswayo closed in 1916, removing the last industry from that village. The Oswayo Valley Silk Company at Shinglehouse closed in 1919 and a large fire that year destroyed the bank, two hardware stores, drug store and shoe shop. The Puritan Glass Works in Shinglehouse were junked in 1919.

In 1917 passenger service was discontinued.

=== 1916 flood damage ===
Service between Canisteo and Genesee was suspended in 1916 after extensive flood damage, including "several bad washouts". 9 miles (14 km) of track were removed between Whitesville and Genesee. Liquidation of the railroad was proposed, since it had failed to pay dividends (earn a profit). After a change in ownership, a new corporation (New York & Pennsylvania Railway), and the raising of new capital, the damage was repaired, the track replaced, a new trestle over Bennett's Creek built in Canisteo, and service for freight only was restored in 1920.

=== 1935 flood damage ===
The flood of 1935 washed bridges and tracks away for 10 miles (16 km) south of Canisteo. Since the line, in its entirety in need of renovation, had been losing money for years, and had little hope of regaining profitability, shareholders voted to end operations. In 1935 the railroad had 24 employees.

== Archival material ==
The records of the New York and Pennsylvania Railroad (184 volumes) are located in the Carl M. Kroch Library at Cornell University.

== See also ==
- Buffalo and Susquehanna Railroad
- Coudersport and Port Allegany Railroad
- Hornell Traction Company
