= Ole Carlson House =

Historic house in Minnesota, United States

- Formerly listed on the U.S. National Register of Historic Places
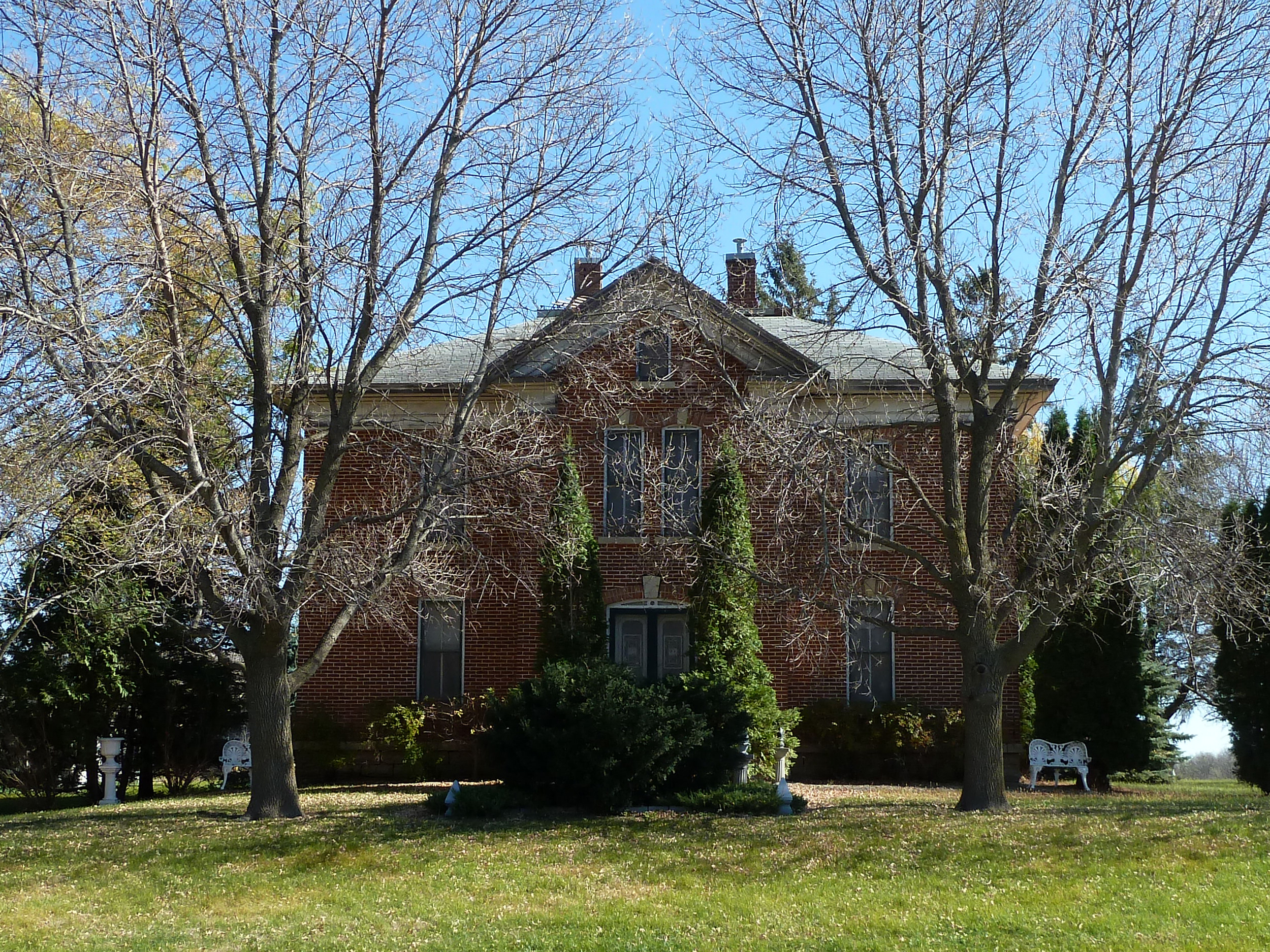

- Location within Minnesota Location within the United States
- Nearest city: Kasson, Minnesota
- Coordinates: 43°57′16″N 92°41′52″W
- Area: less than one acre
- Built: 1880
- Architect: Aasved, Ole Anderson
- MPS: Dodge County MRA
- NRHP reference No.: 82002944

Significant dates
- Added to NRHP: April 16, 1982
- Removed from NRHP: April 17, 2025

The Ole Carlson House is a historic farmhouse in Dodge County, Minnesota. Located in Canisteo Township, it is on County Road 15, approximately 8 miles (13 km) south of Kasson, Minnesota. In 1981, the home remained in the ownership of the grandson and great-grandson of Ole Carlson. The private home was placed on the National Register of Historic Places (NRHP) in 1982, and was delisted in 2025.

== Structure ==
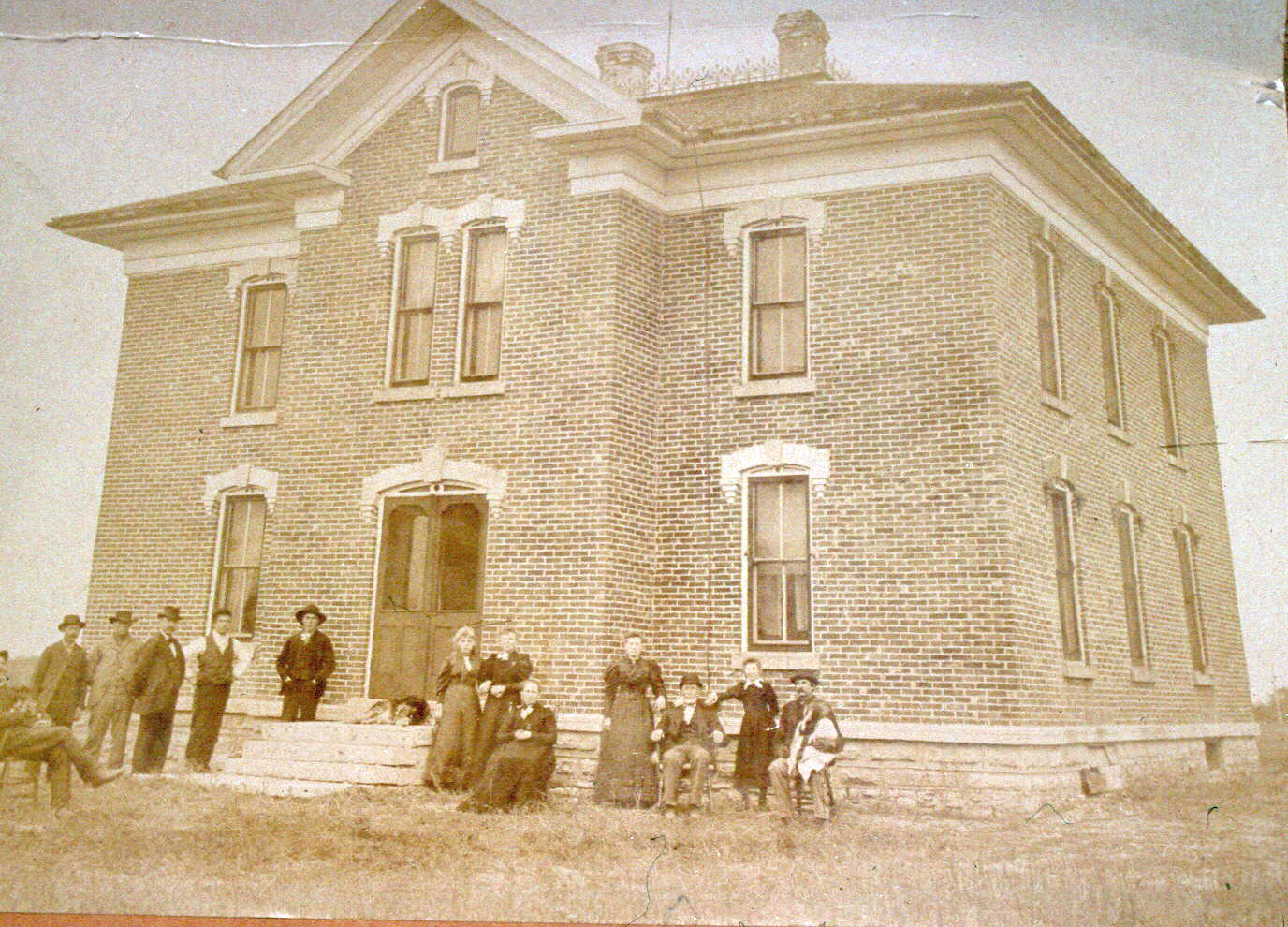
The Ole Carlson House, not long after its construction. Note the existence of balustrade and lack of plantings.

The Ole Carlson House was both designed and built by Ole Anderson Aasved for his neighbor Ole Carlson, a fellow Norwegian immigrant farmer. Its location on a slight elevation makes the structure very visible. The house is a large, two-story, almost square brick structure, symmetrical in arrangement with a hip roof and roof deck, with a projecting central gabled pavilion. At the time the home was completed, it had a balustrade along the edge of the roof deck, however it is no longer present. In addition to the main house, a small one-story brick addition on the eastern side (rear) houses a summer kitchen. The south foundation includes a datestone with the name "O. A. Aasved" and the date "1880".

The design includes elements reminiscent of the Italianate style, which are often found in rural Minnesota farmhouses of the era and used to emphasize verticality. These elements include two-over-two double-hung sash windows in tall rectangular openings with keystone segmental-arch hoods, and hooded double front entrance. Unlike similar houses, conventional eave brackets were never applied to the house.

== History ==
The builder, Ole Anderson Aasved, was born in March 1826 near Trondheim, Norway. Raised on a farm, he had almost no formal education, but he sought to educate himself. Aasved was married several times. He married Christiana Anderson in 1849, and the couple had one child, Christiana (later Mrs. Martin Peterson), before his wife died in 1854. Aasved moved to the United States in 1857, and in 1860 he married fellow Norwegian native Ingred Alexson; they had one daughter, Anna, before Alexson died in 1869. He worked in logging Michigan before settling in Minnesota. In 1865 he enlisted in the 2nd Minnesota Volunteer Cavalry Regiment of the Union Army, but saw no active service and was discharged in the same year.

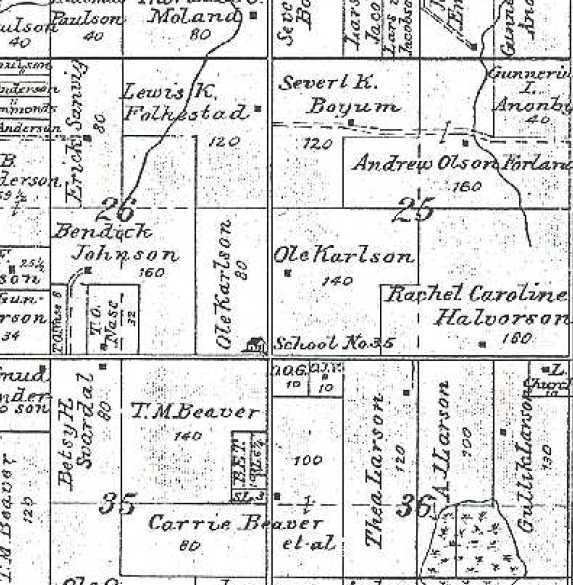
The 1905 plat map of the "Ole Karlson" properties and their acreage in the township. The small black box shows the location of the house.

In Minnesota, Aasved accumulated 220 acres (89 ha) of land in adjacent 140 acres (57 ha) and 80 acres (32 ha) parcels. Aasved finished his own residence in 1882 at a cost of $3,000. In 1883 he married a third time, to fellow Norwegian immigrant Benedicka Hanson.

== Significance ==
The Ole Carlson House was selected for placement on the NRHP based on its significance to the agricultural history of the Upper Midwest, its own unique architecture, and as an example of the ethnic settlements of early Norwegian Americans. A county history of 1884 declared that the house was "the best farm house in the county."
