= Canisteo, New York =

Canisteo
- Town
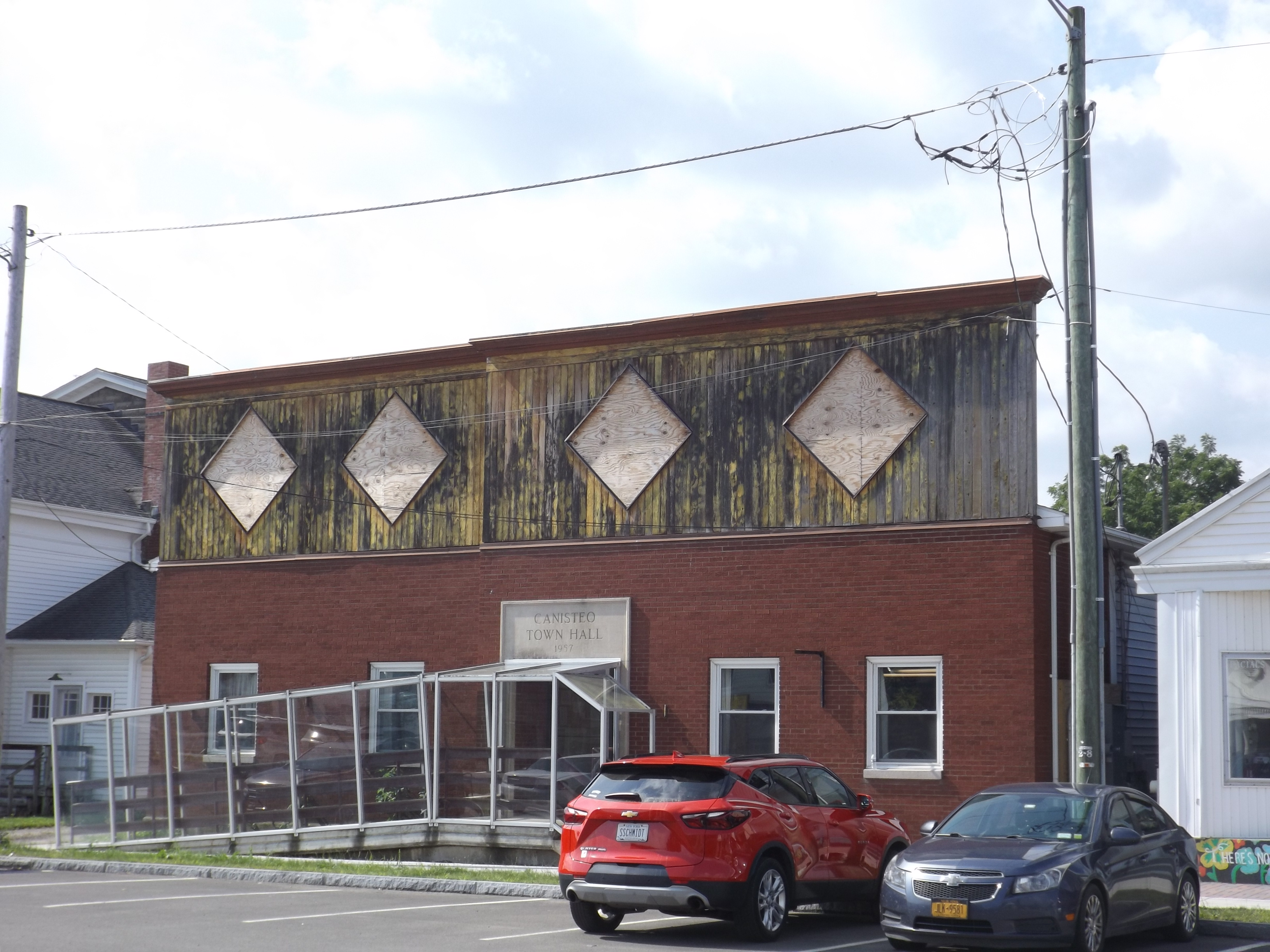
- Town hall

- Location of Canisteo in New York Canisteo (the United States)
- Coordinates: 42°16′13″N 77°36′20″W
- Country: United States
- State: New York
- County: Steuben

Area
  - Total: 54.36 sq mi (140.79 km^{2})
  - Land: 54.35 sq mi (140.77 km^{2})
  - Water: 0.0077 sq mi (0.02 km^{2})

Population (2020)
  - Total: 3,294 ▼
  - Estimate (2021): 3,260
  - Density: 60.1/sq mi (23.22/km^{2})
- Time zone: UTC-5 (Eastern (EST))
  - Summer (DST): UTC-4 (EDT)
- FIPS code: 36-101-12265

Canisteo (/ˌkænɪsˈtiːoʊ/) is a town in Steuben County, New York, United States. The population was 3,294 at the 2020 census. The name was taken from a former Native American village located there, and is Iroquoian in origin.

The Town of Canisteo is in the western part of the county, southeast of Hornell.

The town contains a village also named Canisteo.

== Etymology ==
The name "Canisteo" derives from the Seneca language and translates roughly to "board on the water".

== History ==
The Senecas had a major village here called "Kah-nis-ti-oh." Canisteo is rich in Indian lore.

The first settlers arrived around 1788, making Canisteo one of the earliest locations occupied in the county. A large proportion of the first settlers of Canisteo were from Pennsylvania, since at the time access was primarily via the Susquehanna River; there were no direct links to Albany or New York City.

The town was formed in 1796 at the time of the creation of the county and is one of its original towns.

A local writer, in the year 1811, in describing the town of Canisteo says, "it is 19 miles (31 km) miles long, north and south, by 14 miles (23 km) wide; its area is 266 square miles (690 km^{2}). The Canisteo River courses centrally across the town, and is boatable from Arkport to Tioga, in the town of Painted Post. Boats descend the Canisteo laden with one thousand bushels of wheat. The settlements are of recent date, and still retain their first local names. At Hornell's Mills, on the Canisteo, is a ferry and a road of pretty extensive travel; here is located the Canisteo Post-office."

Products were shipped via the Canisteo, Chemung, and Susquehanna Rivers to the port of Baltimore.

Hornell was originally a village in the town of Canisteo. From parts of Canisteo came, in whole or part, the Towns of West Union, Hartsville, Hornellsville (1820), Troupsburg (1808, 1818), Greenwood (1827), and Jasper (1837).

The population of Canisteo in 1905 was 3,171.

Residents of Canisteo settled Canisteo Township, Dodge County, Minnesota.

== Living sign ==
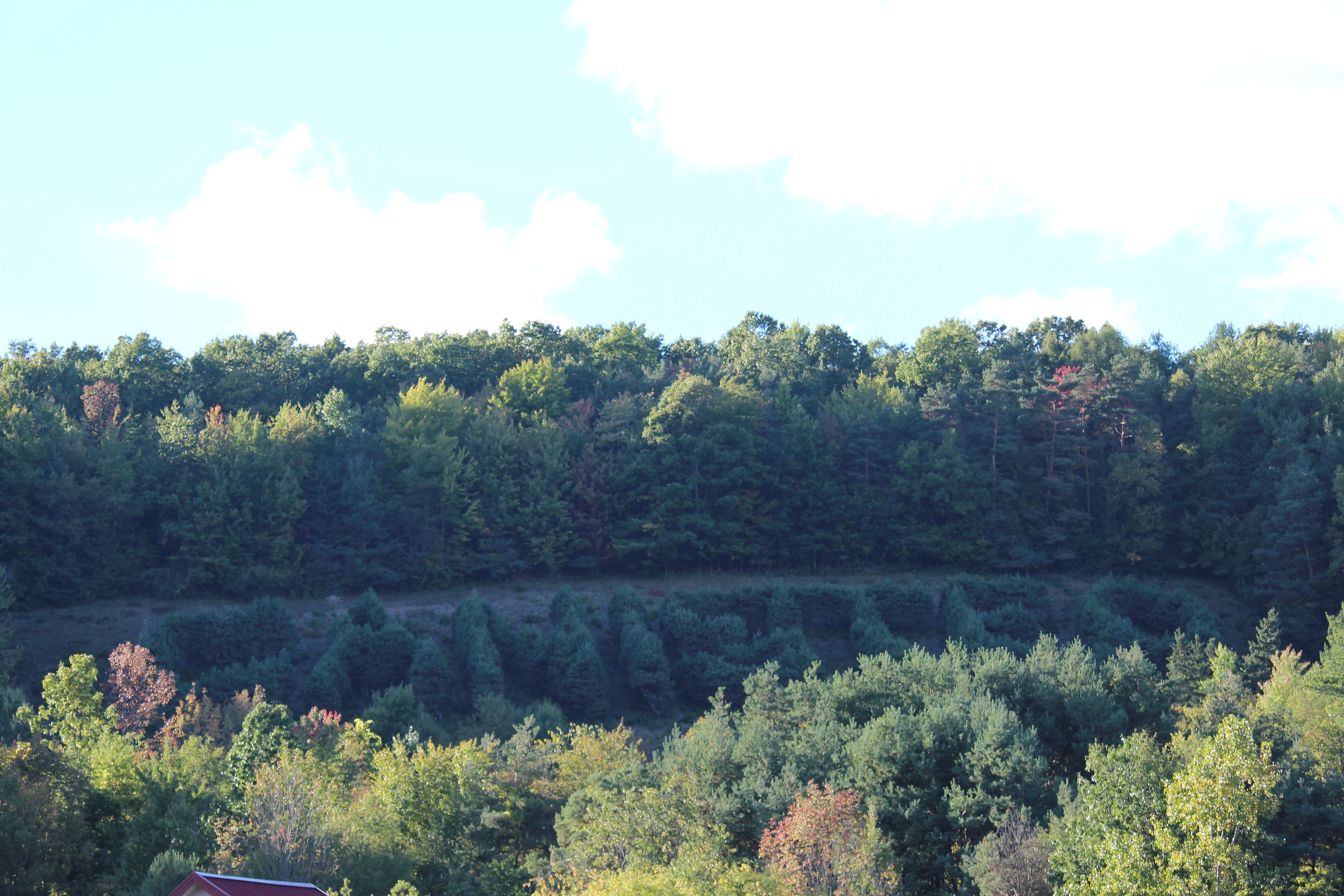
Canisteo Living Sign

The Canisteo Living Sign is the largest living sign in the world, noted by both Ripley's Believe it or Not! and the Registry of Historical Places. It is 60 feet (18 m) by 400 feet (120 m), and consists of Scotch pine. The seeds for it were planted in 1934.

== Business and industry ==
The original activities in the town of Canisteo were farming and lumbering; the Canisteo River offered transportation for products.

After arrival of the Erie Railroad in 1851, the Village of Canisteo was home to a variety of small manufacturers.

In the early 21st century Canisteo was the administrative center of the Canisteo Wind Farm, producing electricity from southwestern Steuben County and adjacent areas.

== Schools ==
The Town of Canisteo's schools are all located in the village of Canisteo.

=== One room schools ===
Canisteo's first school was a one-room school on Greenwood Street, across from the present Baptist Church. A schoolhouse was built in 1826. There were a variety of one-room schools around the township.

=== Canisteo Graded School ===
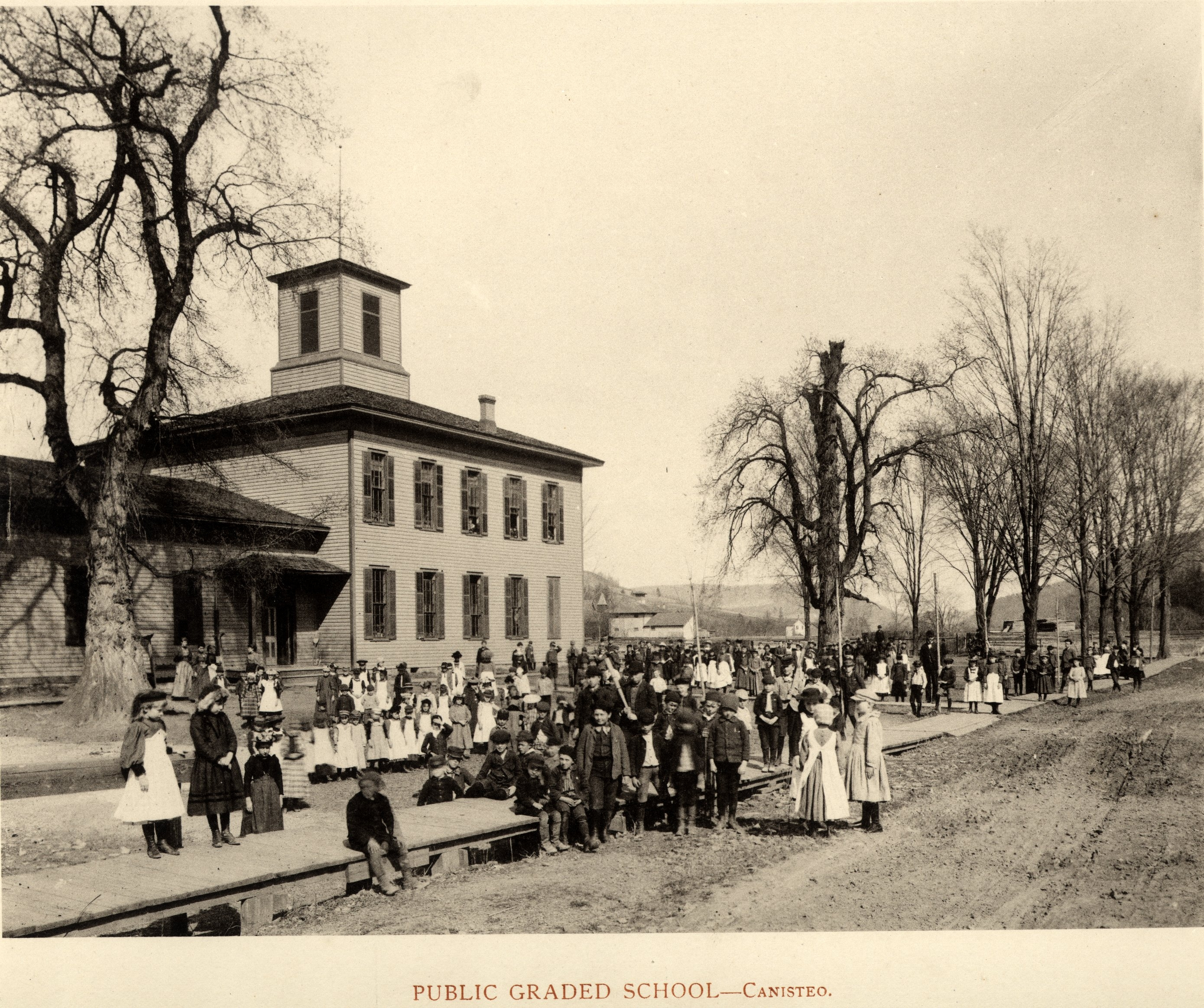
Canisteo Graded School, 1891, looking east on Fifth Street.

The oldest school building, School No. 1 on the 1873 Atlas map, also called Canisteo Graded School and Canisteo Union School, was a wooden frame building at 22 Fifth Street. It began as what would be called today an elementary school. In a news story on the best students of 1893–1894 we see that there were five teachers, all women, plus the male principal, who also taught. Each taught two grades in a single classroom, except for the third grade, which was evidently larger and split into two divisions, which occupied one room. Kindergarten had its own room and two divisions. There were five classrooms, and 11th grade the highest.

In 1900, a report on the "annual school meeting", held in the "union school building", reveals that the school would cost $7,947 (equivalent to $307,549 in 2025) to run for the coming year, of which $4,495.32 (equivalent to $173,969 in 2025) would be raised by tax. There were 54 voters at the meeting, which reduced the Board of Education from nine to five members. After its abandonment in 1914 when the Greenwood Street Elementary School was built, it became Strait's Mill, then a feed store, before being torn down about 1952 and replaced by a bus garage. Adjacent to it to the south, between Fifth and Sixth Streets, is the Rotary Field, which remained the venue for school sports until the 1990s, when new facilities were built on Purdy Creek Road.

=== Canisteo Academy ===
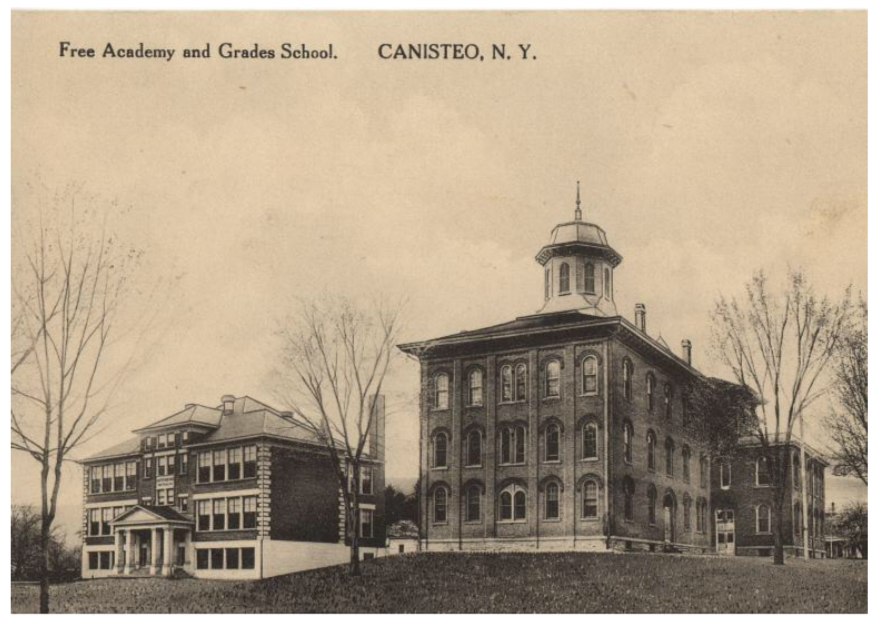
Free Academy and Grades School, Canisteo, NY, c. 1900. The cupula housed the rotating telescope.

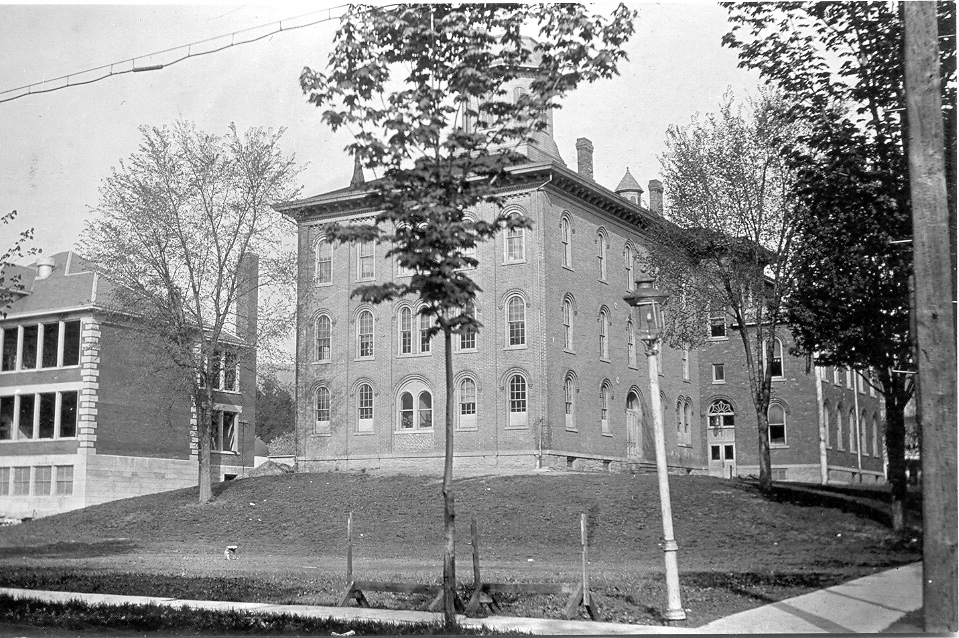
Canisteo Academy, early 20th century. Note the gas street lamp. Overhead is a telephone wire.

Canisteo Academy was the second high school, at the time called academies, in Steuben County (the first was the long-vanished Addison Academy). It came into legal existence in 1868, and obtained funding to build a brick building on Greenwood Street, which opened in 1871. There was no similar school in Hornellsville (Hornell), Bath, or Corning; in Hornellsville none appears in the records until St. Ann's Academic School, in 1894. To reach another academy from Canisteo one had to go 15 miles (24 km) northwest, to Alfred, New York, in Allegheny County. The Addison Academy was 27 miles (43 km) to the southeast.

Canisteo Academy was founded by Rev. Lewis F. Laine (1806–1891). "It had a very creditable observatory, equipped with a large revolving telescope—the only one in the county." The New York and Pennsylvania Railroad (1896–1916) crossed Academy St., where it stopped at a platform for student and teacher use. Students came from as far as Pennsylvania, at least 25 miles (40 km). Some stayed during the week in boarding houses.

Students paid tuition until 1897, when it became a free public school. Tuition in 1874 was $10 per term. At that time the following subjects were offered, arranged by school department: Latin, Greek, German, French, and English language; arithmetic, algebra, and geometry; natural philosophy (science), botany, geology, physiology, anatomy, and geography. They were not all taught in every term. In 1901, Regents Exams were given in rhetoric, civics, economics, Caesar (Latin), Virgil (Latin), Xenophon (Greek), and physiology. Principal in 1894 was D. M. Estee, A.M., author of a textbook on government.

A week-long Teachers' Institute was held at the academy during vacation periods. In 1892, it was held on January 11–15, and again on December 19–23.

=== Twentieth-century schools ===
An elementary school was built in 1914 just to the south of the academy, replacing the 5th Street building. In 1937, with consolidation of the town schools, the academy building was demolished, as was the Elementary School with the exception of the heating plant, in the rear. A new Canisteo Central School was constructed, attaching to the preserved heating plant portion of the elementary school, constructing a new front and main entrance facing Greenwood Street, connecting with the portion of the building occupying the academy site. This is today (2019) the Canisteo–Greenwood High School. An addition was constructed in 1949, containing a cafeteria, music rooms, and classrooms. In 1959, a new elementary school was constructed further south, at 120 Greenwood Street, including a competition swimming pool. In the vote authorizing the construction, the swimming pool was on the ballot separately, but both passed, the pool by a smaller margin. At present the building houses both the elementary and a middle school. In 2004, the Canisteo schools merged with those of Greenwood to form the Canisteo-Greenwood School District.

Canisteo-Greenwood in 2017 is the only school in Steuben County that has an orchestra as well as a band. The only other orchestra, at Corning Northside in the much larger city of Corning, closed about 1990.

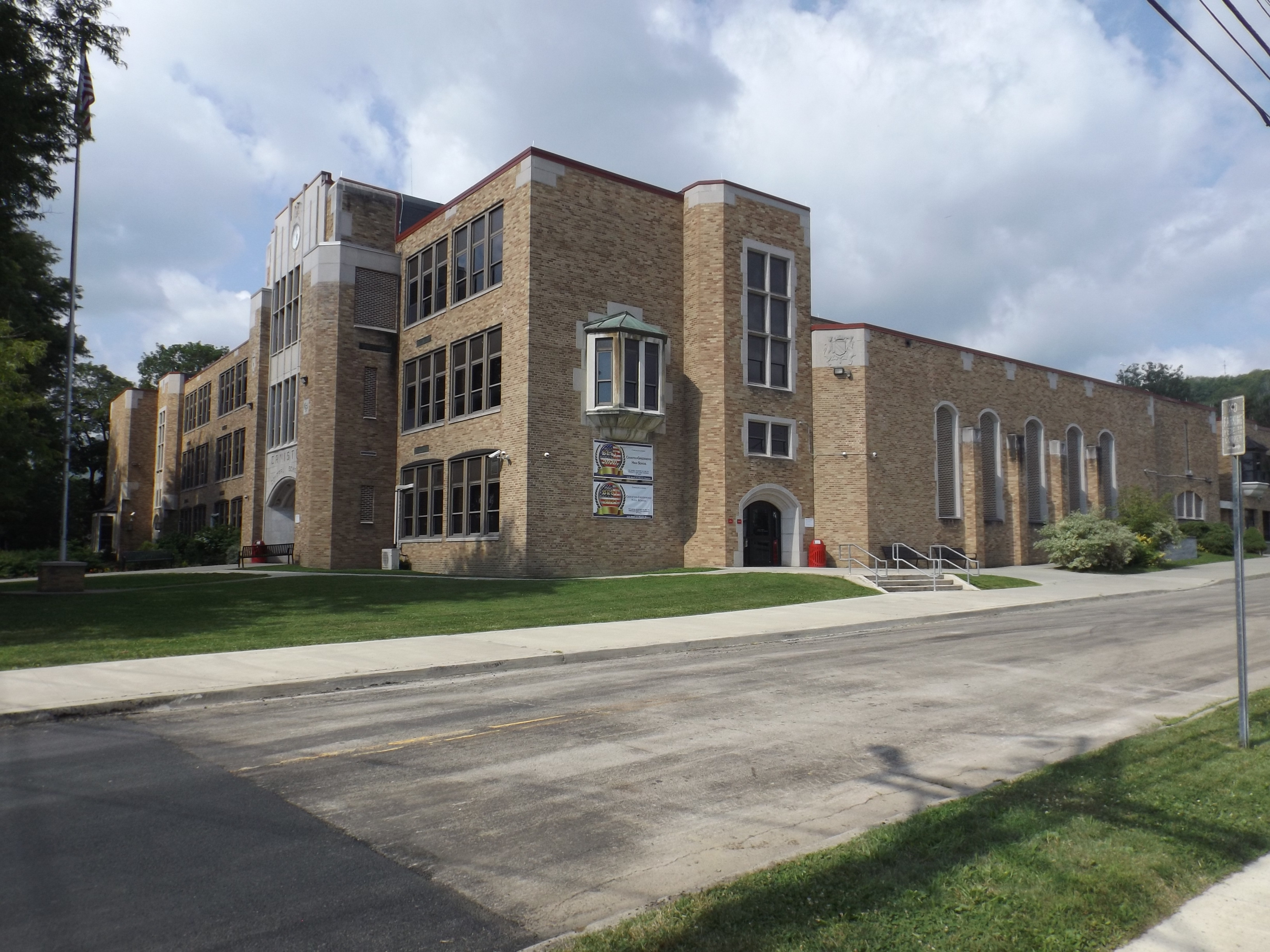
Canisteo-Greenwood High School

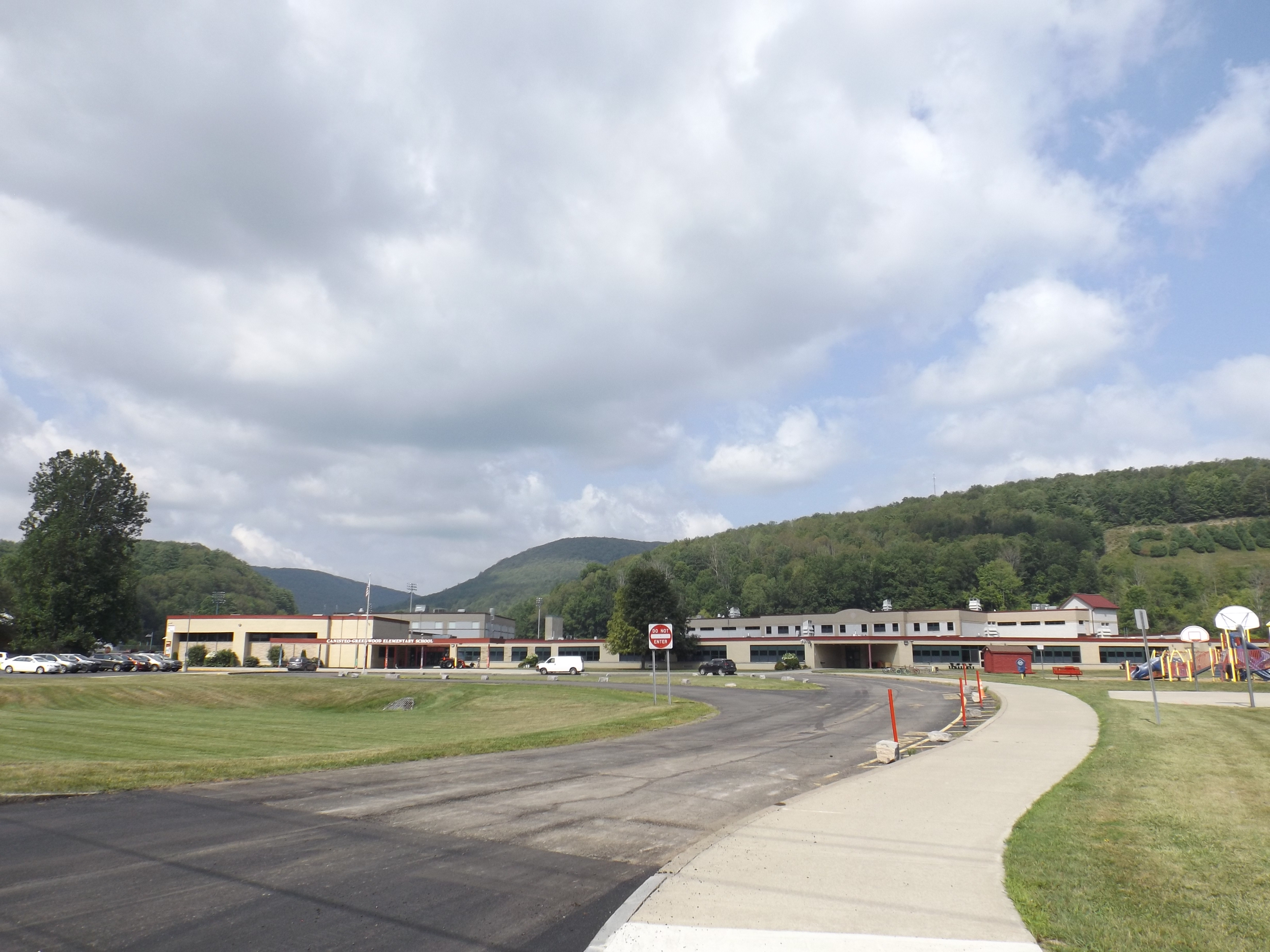
Canisteo-Greenwood Elementary School

== Geography ==
According to the United States Census Bureau, the town has a total area of 54.4 square miles (140.8 km^{2}), all land.

The Canisteo River flows west to east through the northern part of the town.

New York State Route 248 begins at New York State Route 36 in Canisteo village.

== Demographics ==
Historical population
Census	Pop.	Note	%±
1820	891		—
1830	620		−30.4%
1840	941		51.8%
1850	2,030		115.7%
1860	2,337		15.1%
1870	2,435		4.2%
1880	3,604		48.0%
1890	3,629		0.7%
1900	3,432		−5.4%
1910	3,441		0.3%
1920	2,901		−15.7%
1930	3,391		16.9%
1940	3,381		−0.3%
1950	3,568		5.5%
1960	3,652		2.4%
1970	3,777		3.4%
1980	3,991		5.7%
1990	3,636		−8.9%
2000	3,583		−1.5%
2010	3,391		−5.4%
2020	3,294		−2.9%
2021 (est.)	3,260	▼	−1.0%
U.S. Decennial Census

As of the census of 2000, there were 3,583 people, 1,423 households, and 980 families residing in the town. The population density was 65.9 inhabitants per square mile (25.4/km^{2}). There were 1,704 housing units at an average density of 31.3 per square mile (12.1/km^{2}). The racial makeup of the town was 98.24% White, 0.20% Black or African American, 0.17% Native American, 0.53% Asian, 0.25% from other races, and 0.61% from two or more races. Hispanic or Latino of any race were 0.84% of the population.

There were 1,423 households, out of which 30.6% had children under the age of 18 living with them, 54.5% were married couples living together, 9.1% had a female householder with no husband present, and 31.1% were non-families. 26.8% of all households were made up of individuals, and 13.6% had someone living alone who was 65 years of age or older. The average household size was 2.52 and the average family size was 3.04.

In the town, the population was spread out, with 26.2% under the age of 18, 7.7% from 18 to 24, 24.9% from 25 to 44, 25.8% from 45 to 64, and 15.4% who were 65 years of age or older. The median age was 39 years. For every 100 females, there were 93.9 males. For every 100 females age 18 and over, there were 91.2 males.

The median income for a household in the town was $35,308, and the median income for a family was $41,859. Males had a median income of $32,225 versus $20,192 for females. The per capita income for the town was $15,162. About 8.8% of families and 11.6% of the population were below the poverty line, including 11.9% of those under age 18 and 2.3% of those age 65 or over.

== Communities and locations in the Town of Canisteo ==
- Adrian – A hamlet in the northeast part of the town, east of Canisteo village on County Road 119 (Canisteo River Road) by the Canisteo River.
- Bennetts – A hamlet to the south of the village, on NY-248 and Bennetts Creek. A flag stop on the New York & Pennsylvania Railroad.
- Bennetts Creek – A north-flowing stream entering the Canisteo River by Canisteo village.
- Browns Crossing – A hamlet by the east town line on County Road 119 (Canisteo River Road) by the Canisteo River.
- Canisteo – The Village of Canisteo, at the junction of Routes 36 (Main Street) and 248 (Greenwood Street), about one mile west of the Canisteo River, County Route 128 (older than NY Route 36), and the former Erie train line and depot.
- Canisteo Center – A hamlet east of Canisteo village on County Road 119 (Canisteo River Road). The original village, until the railway station, over a mile to the north, was built in the mid-nineteenth century.
- Carson – Another name for Canisteo Center (to avoid confusion with Canisteo)
- Dead Man's Hole – A swimming area on the west bank of Bennetts Creek south of Canisteo village and east of NY 36.
- Fall Creek A hamlet to the south of the village but north of Bennetts, on NY-248 and Bennetts Creek. A flag stop on the New York & Pennsylvania Railroad.
- Rock Run – A hamlet north of South Canisteo on NY-36.
- Purdy Creek – An east-flowing stream entering Bennett's Creek by Canisteo village. "Purdy" is a regional, supposedly uneducated pronunciation of "pretty".
- Rock Run – A location north of South Canisteo.
- South Canisteo – A hamlet southeast of Canisteo village on NY-36.

== See also ==
- Glenwood Inn (Hornellsville, New York)
- Hornell Traction Company
