= McBurney House =

Coordinates: 42.284948°N 77.624330°W

The McBurney House is the oldest surviving house in Steuben County, New York. It is located at 5872 Dineen Road (formerly New York Route 36), between the village of Canisteo and the city of Hornell, in the town of Hornellsville, New York. It is served by the Canisteo post office.

A marker at the site reads:

Oldest house in Steuben County.

Erected 1797 by Col. James McBurney.

A probable station of the UNDERGROUND RAILWAY.

State Education Department 1932
