= Hornell Traction Company =

American electric streetcar company

The Hornell Traction Company was an electric streetcar company serving Hornell and Canisteo, New York, between 1892 and 1926.

== Beginnings ==
The Hornellsville Electric Railway Company was formed December 16, 1891; President was Charles Adsit, Secretary was Demerville Page, and Treasurer was George T. Rehn. The Canisteo Valley Railway Company was formed on December 28, 1891, with plans to run a line to Jasper, Woodhull, and Addison; President was William T. Bailey and Vice-President William Potter. It never began operations. The Hornellsville & Canisteo Railway Company was formed May 12, 1892; President was Page, Secretary was Adsit, and Treasurer was Rehn. It took over the assets and "certain obligations" of the previous company.

Both companies shared a depot and car barn at Adsit and Thacher Streets in Hornell. Offices were at 119 Main Street, later 126 Main Street, in Hornell.

Service began on August 4, 1892; and was the occasion for a parade and speeches by local officials. The franchise required that the company pay Hornellsville 1% of its gross receipts.

Service on the Canisteo line began December 28, 1892, after a trial run on the 22nd. Initial service was one car every two hours. Through at least 1909 the fare within Hornell was 5¢; Hornell to Canisteo was 10¢; fare to the Glenwood from either Canisteo or Hornell was 5¢. Frequency on the Canisteo line was never less than one car every two hours; more often it was hourly, and more often at peak hours, up to 20 trips a day. (The horse-drawn "stage" which was its predecessor made two trips a day, for 25¢.) Construction was completed in 1893. A branch was built in 1894 to Babcock's Track, a horse race track, of which there is a drawing but whose exact location is not known; perhaps it is the Jones Driving Park of the 1873 map. The companies owned 15 miles (24 km) of track.

== Equipment ==
The original equipment was five 18 feet (5.5 m) cars, "finished in cherry with double thick French plate glass", with electric heat. Each had two 20-horsepower motors. Each cost $3,580 (equivalent to $125,000 in 2024) delivered. There were also another five trailer cars without motors, to be attached at moments of peak load. On these cars, which cost $965 each (equivalent to $33,771 in 2024), the windows and sides could be removed in the summer, creating open cars.

== Routes ==
=== Hornell ===
The line started at the Shawmut (Pittsburg, Shawmut and Northern RR) station on Seneca Street, near the line's car barn at Adsit and Thacher. South on Seneca to Main, east to Center, south on Center to Loder and the Erie Depot, Loder to River, east to Main, ending at East Main and East Avenue. Return was via Main Street; there were double tracks on Main between Center and Broad (today Broadway). The line was later extended south along East Avenue to Hart Street. It was divided into Green and White Lines, with only the White Line extending to Hart St. A North Hornell line was added, and then the Canisteo Line. The lines were timed to connect with each other, and the conductors issued transfers upon request. All lines met at Main and Broad Streets. Broad and Center both had double tracks, where cars could be parked between runs.

=== Canisteo ===
The biggest project was the line to Canisteo, whose first stage only went on Canisteo Street as far as St. James Mercy Hospital.

The Canisteo Line was delayed by the Erie Railroad that the tracks had to cross. The Erie, which charged 30¢ from Hornellsville to Canisteo, saw the trolleys as competition (and was pressured to match their lower fare), and their lack of cooperation, they having served the trolley company with an injunction, ended up in court. That disagreement resolved in principle, a major problem was crossing the Erie tracks at the south end of Broad Street. It was not practical to run the line across the Erie tracks, and at first the trolleys had to be pulled across the Erie tracks by horses. The solution was to build an underpass, locally called a subway.

That the route between Hornell and Canisteo is on the south side of the Canisteo River, rather than the north, reflects inducements to follow that route.

The line connected the Erie Railroad depot in Canisteo with the center of the village, Four Corners. Depot Street was renamed Railroad Street, since the trolley tracks ran down the middle of the street. At Walnut Street there was a second track where unused cars could be placed temporarily. The route continued through Four Corners south on Greenwood Street, ending at a miniature, one-car garage just south of Pine Street. Presumably that was the terminus because the Canisteo Silk Mill, at one point Canisteo's largest employer, was there. It is not correct that the route entered Canisteo on Pine Street, using the bed of the unbuilt Rochester, Hornellsville, and Pine Creek Railroad, ending at Depot and Walnut Streets. In its later years the trolley ended its route af Four Corners, offering connection with the New York & Pennsylvania Railroad, whose station was a block away, at the other end of Canisteo's park, The Green.

After the trolley ceased operation Railroad Street was renamed Depot Street, its original name.

== The Glenwood Inn ==
In order to make ridership grow, "Hornellsville & Canisteo electric railway people" in 1893 bought property in South Hornell, formerly belonging to Hendershott, "about midway between the two towns", to create "a summer park and picnic ground". This would be Glenwood Park, where the Glenwood Inn would be built. The company ran regular Sunday excursion trains to Glenwood, 2 miles (3.2 km) south of Hornellsville and 3 miles (4.8 km) north of Canisteo. At the first 4 July celebration there, with fireworks, "It seemed as if the entire population of both Canisteo and Hornellsville had been emptied into the glen.... The carrying capacity of the road was taxed to its utmost." "The inn, boat house and merry go-round [sic] did a land office business." At the conclusion, "Car after car was packed to utmost capacity...the tracks on both sides lined with men women and children, all eager for the first conveyance home."

== Expansion plans ==
In 1906 the Steuben Traction Company, which issued stock, was formed from a merger of the Hornellsville Electric Railway Company, the Hornellsville & Canisteo Railway Company, and the otherwise unknown Canisteo Valley Traction Company and Canisteo, Jasper & Woodhull Railway Company. It had plans to build a line from Canisteo to Jasper. In 1909, no reference being made to the Steuben Traction Company, the Hornellsville Electric Railway Company, the Hornellsville & Canisteo Railway Company, and the Canisteo Valley Electric Railway Company merged to form the Hornell Traction Company, which also issued stock. Service frequency improved (first car 8:30 AM instead of 9:05, for example). Local line extensions were built in 1913. Nothing came of talk of extensions to Keuka Lake via Bath and Hammondsport, and through Arkport to Dansville, linking with service to Rochester. In 1920, the fare was 8¢.

== Deterioration and closure ==
Traffic dwindled in the 1910s and 1920s as the company was faced with stiff competition from automobiles and the new hard-surface state highway linking Hornell and Canisteo (later New York State Route 36), built in 1912. By 1914 there were so many claims for injuries to passengers that the company was temporarily forced into receivership. The Glenwood complex was completely destroyed by fire in 1923. At the same time, the company's equipment was "rapidly deteriorating"; it was "dilapidated". By 1924 it was again in receivership; fares were cut to 7¢, or 20 for $1, and the Canisteo line service was cut from a car each half hour to one per hour. At its liquidation shareholders received nothing and bondholders received ten cents on the dollar. All service was shut down on July 15, 1926. All assets except the rails in the streets were liquidated in 1926 for $14,600. The wooden ties of the track were sold as firewood; some cars, sold for $50, became chicken coops; one became a home. Car 34, the snowplow car, stripped and in poor condition, is in storage at the New York Museum of Transportation in Rush, New York.

== Gallery ==
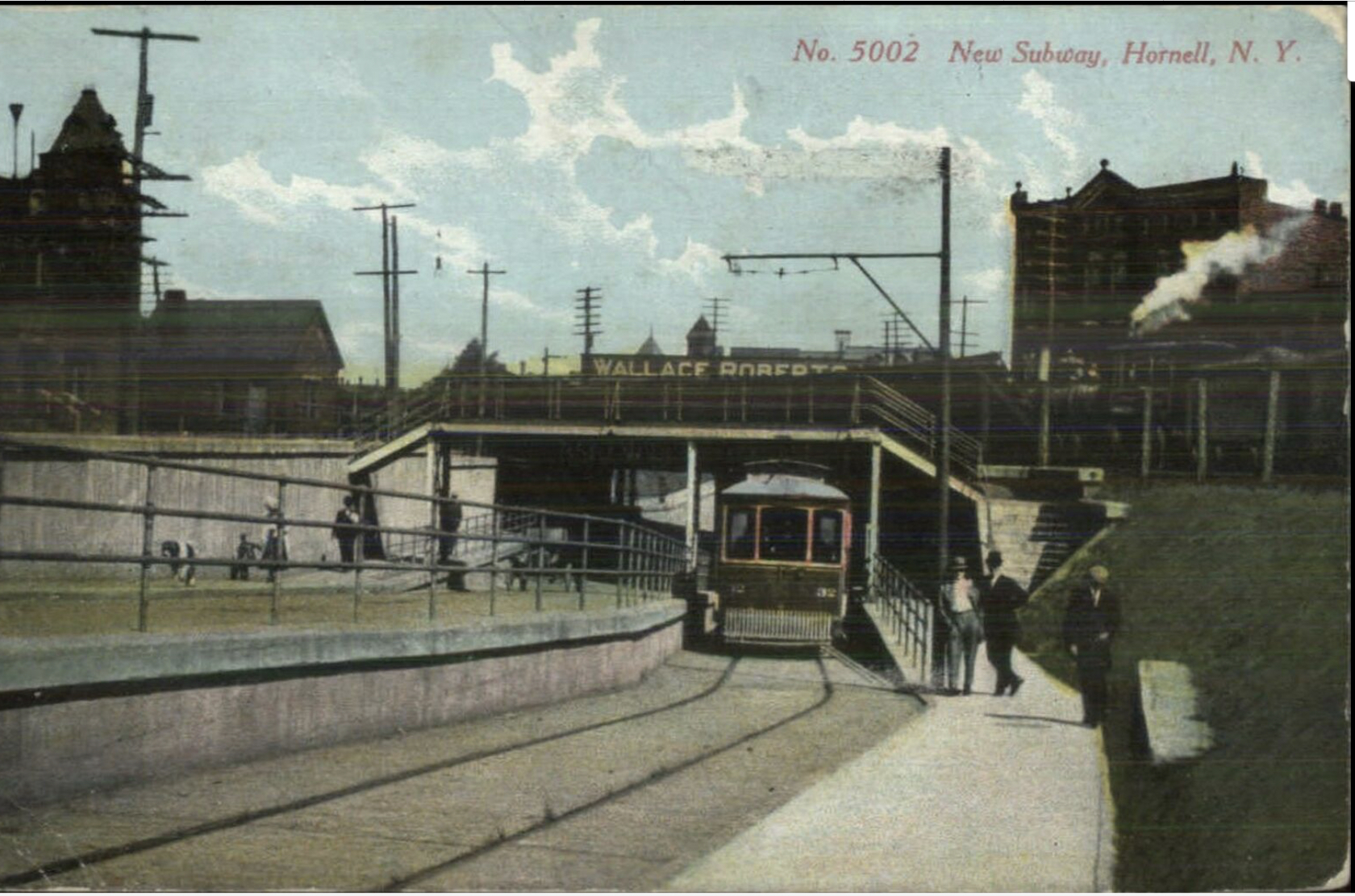
The Subway, Hornell, New York. Erie Railroad tracks on top. Picture taken from Canisteo Street facing north, toward downtown Hornell.

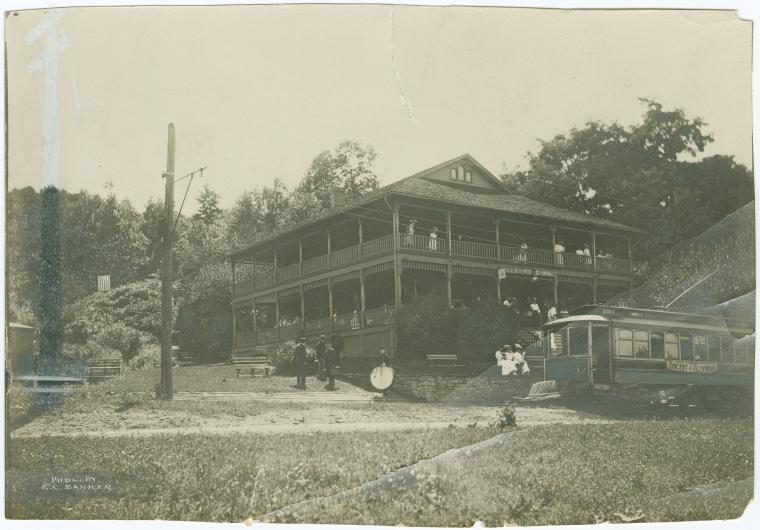
Excursion train to the Glenwood Inn. The banner on the trolley says "Concert at Glenwood". Trolley is stopped (end of route) before starting back to Hornellsville. Note that the car is smaller: only 6, rather than 8, windows on each side.

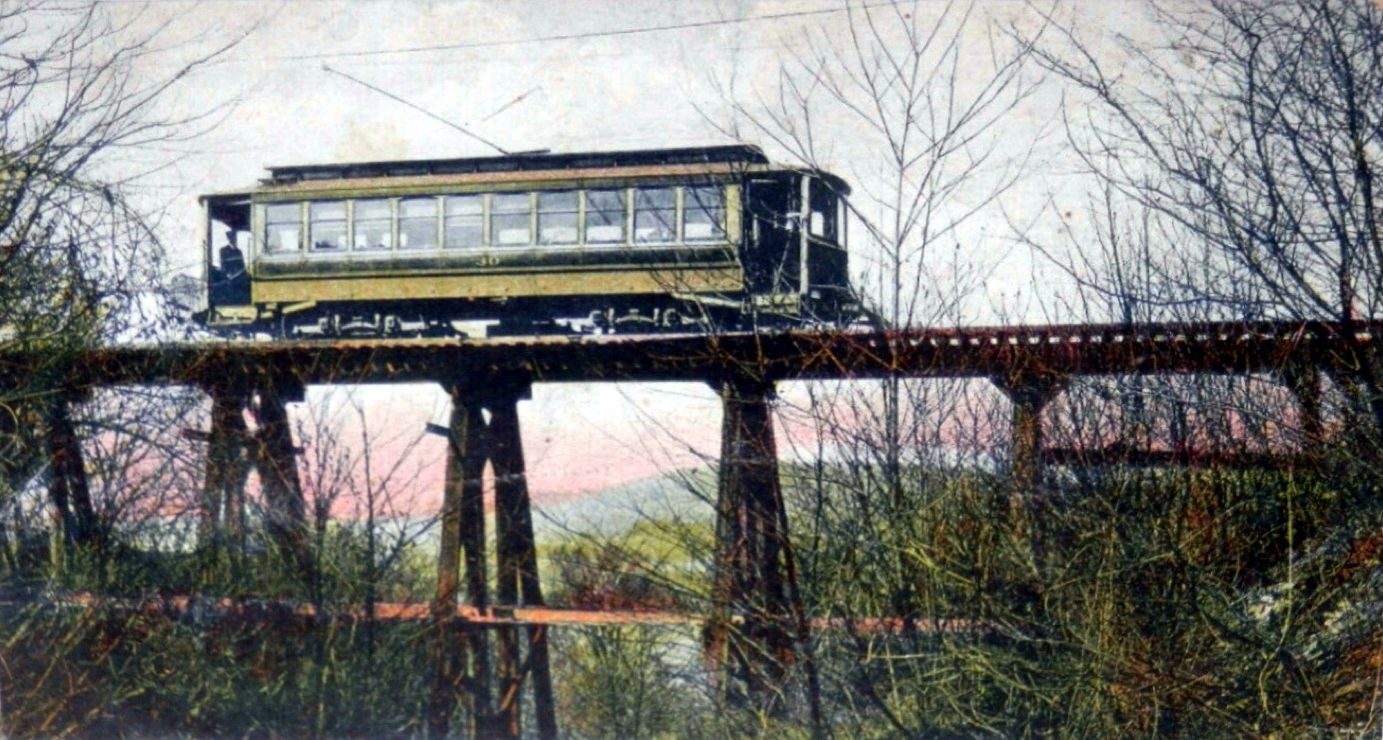
The Hornell-Canisteo Trolley, 1892-1926

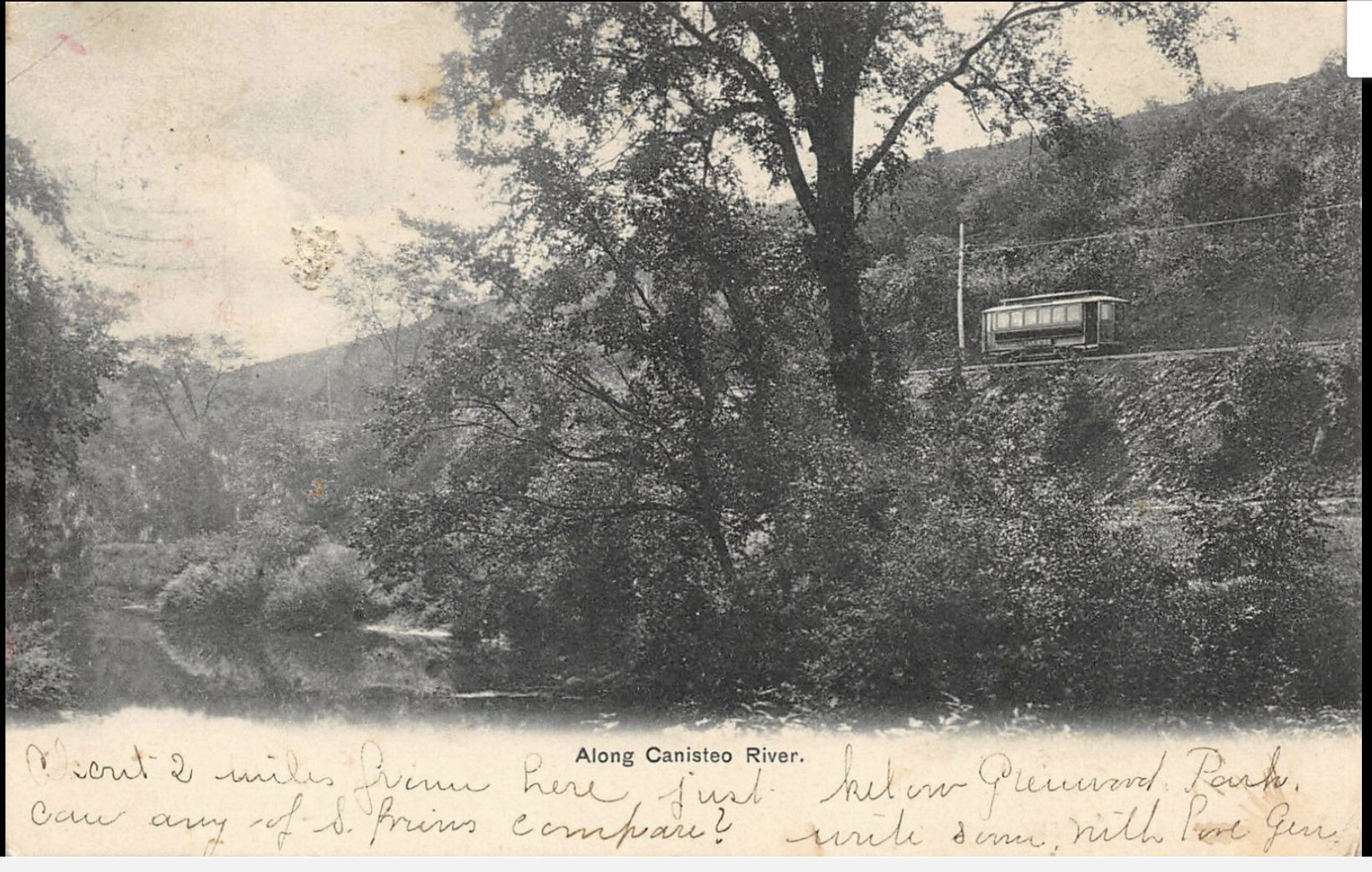
Trolley between Hornell and Canisteo, along the Canisteo River

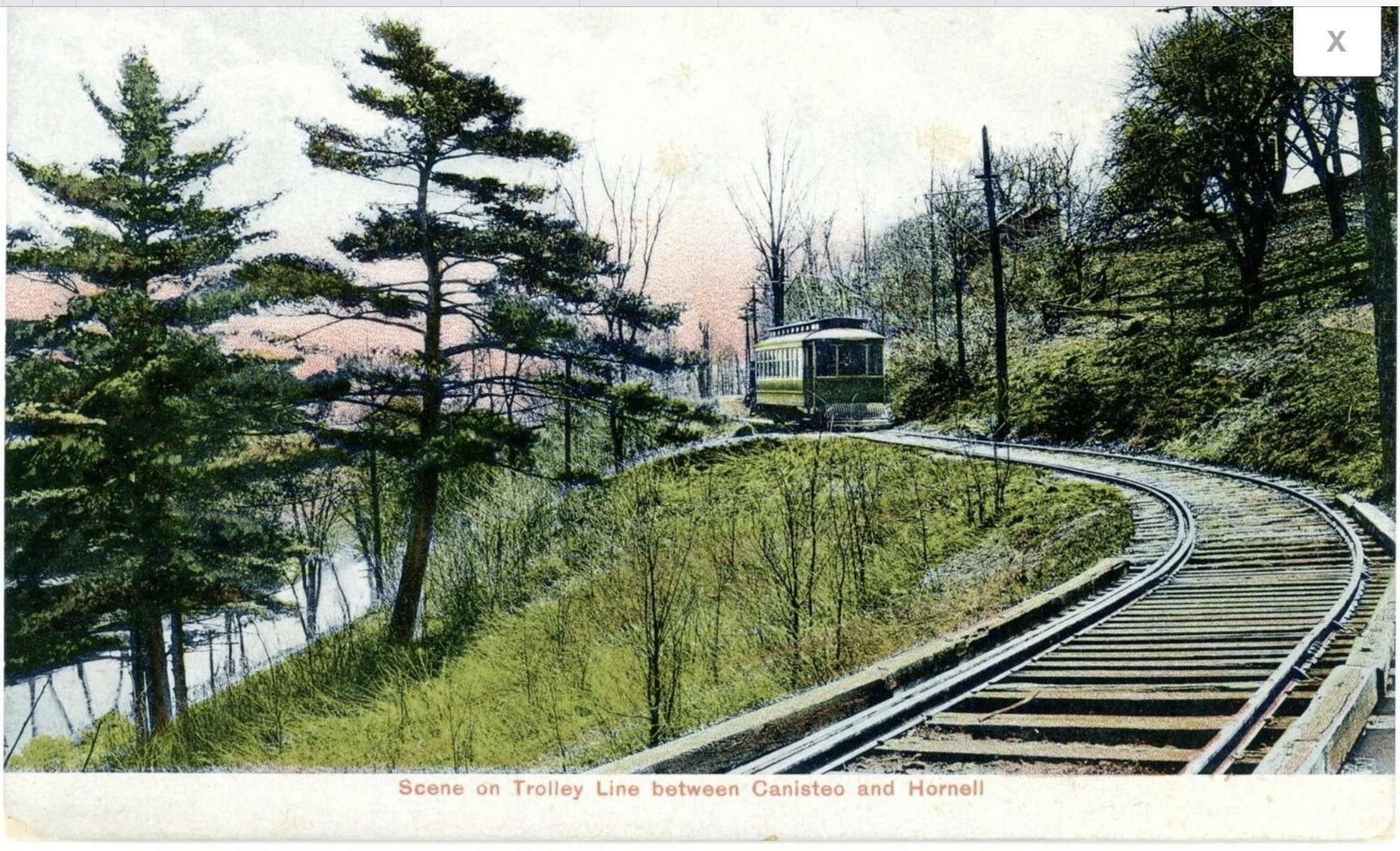
Trolley between Hornell and Canisteo

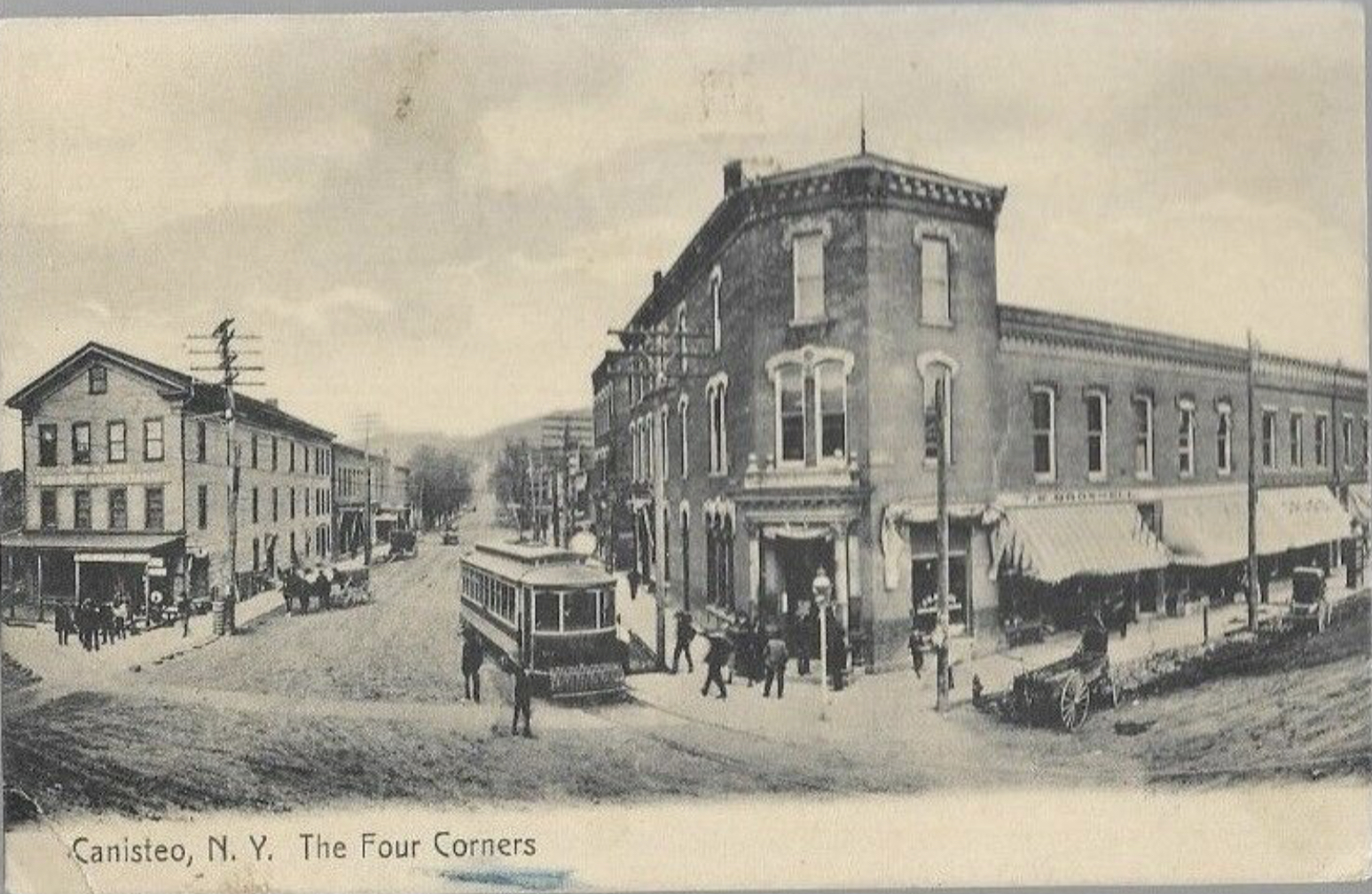
Four Corners, Canisteo, New York. View is of Depot Street looking north towards the station.

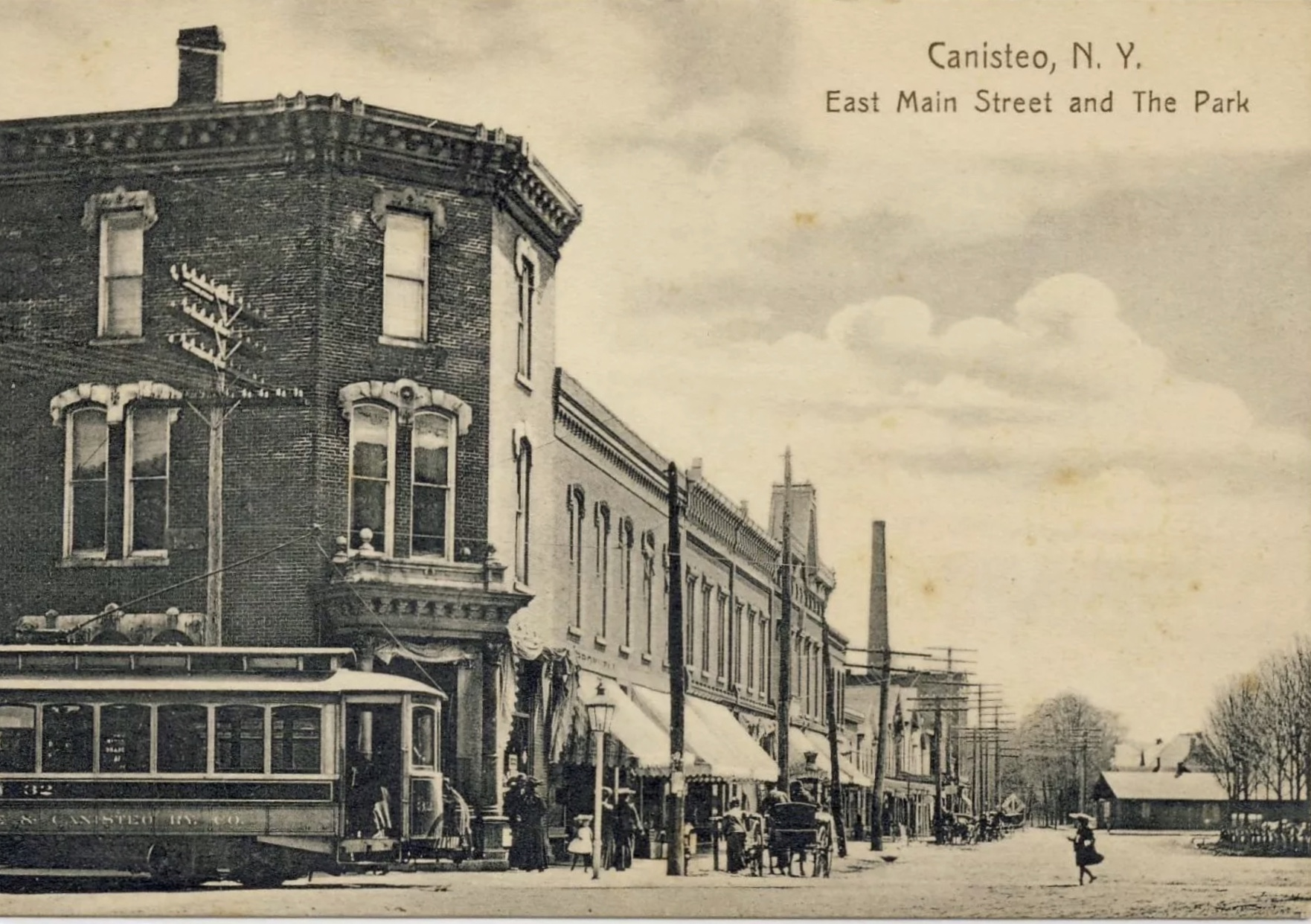
Four Corners, Canisteo, New York, looking east over East Main Street

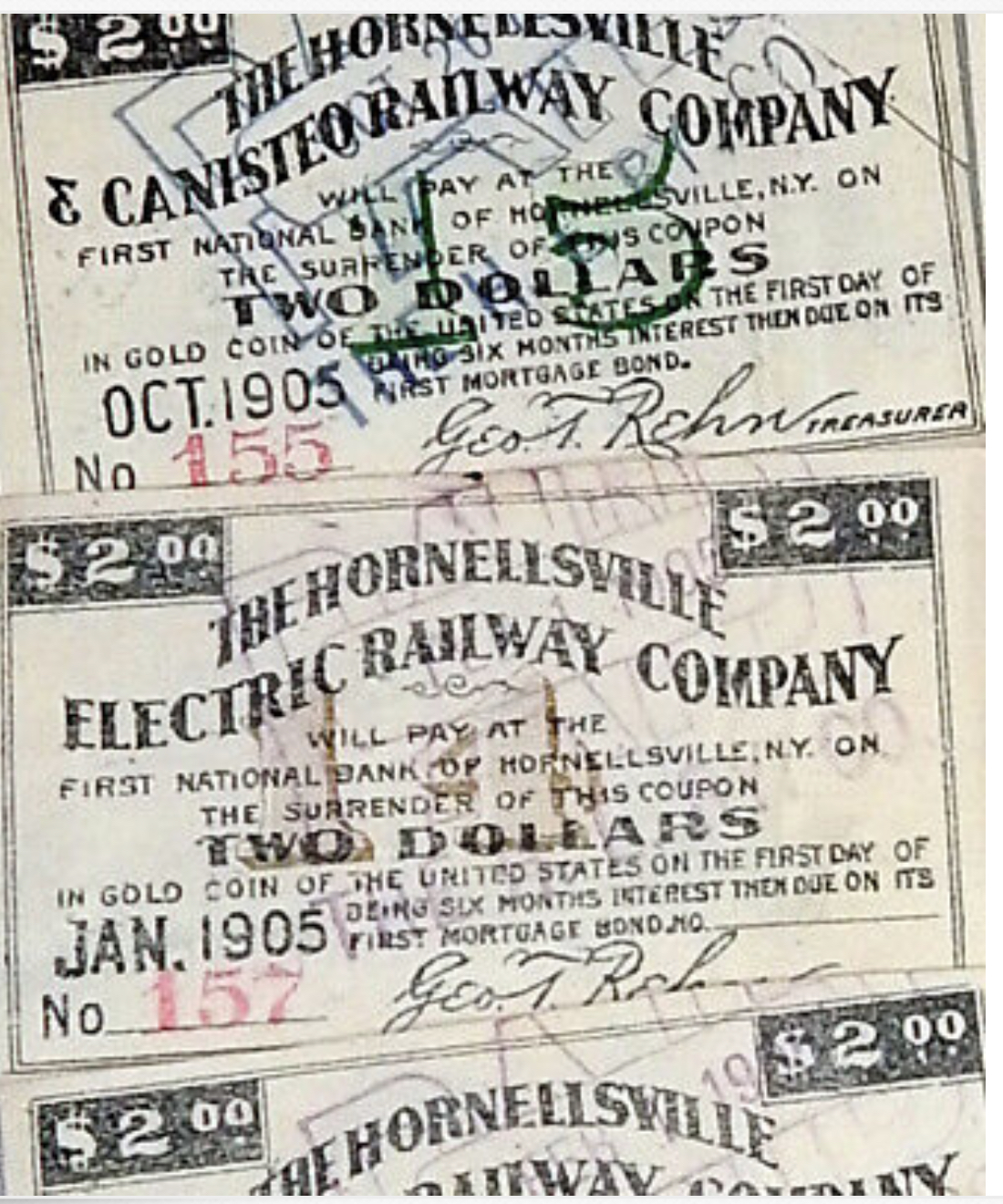
Coupons redeemable for interest on bonds of the Hornellsville Electric Railway Company and Hornellsville & Canisteo Railway Company

== See also ==
- Glenwood Inn (Hornellsville, New York)
- New York and Pennsylvania Railroad
