= Canisteo Living Sign =

Sign in Steuben County, New York

- U.S. National Register of Historic Places
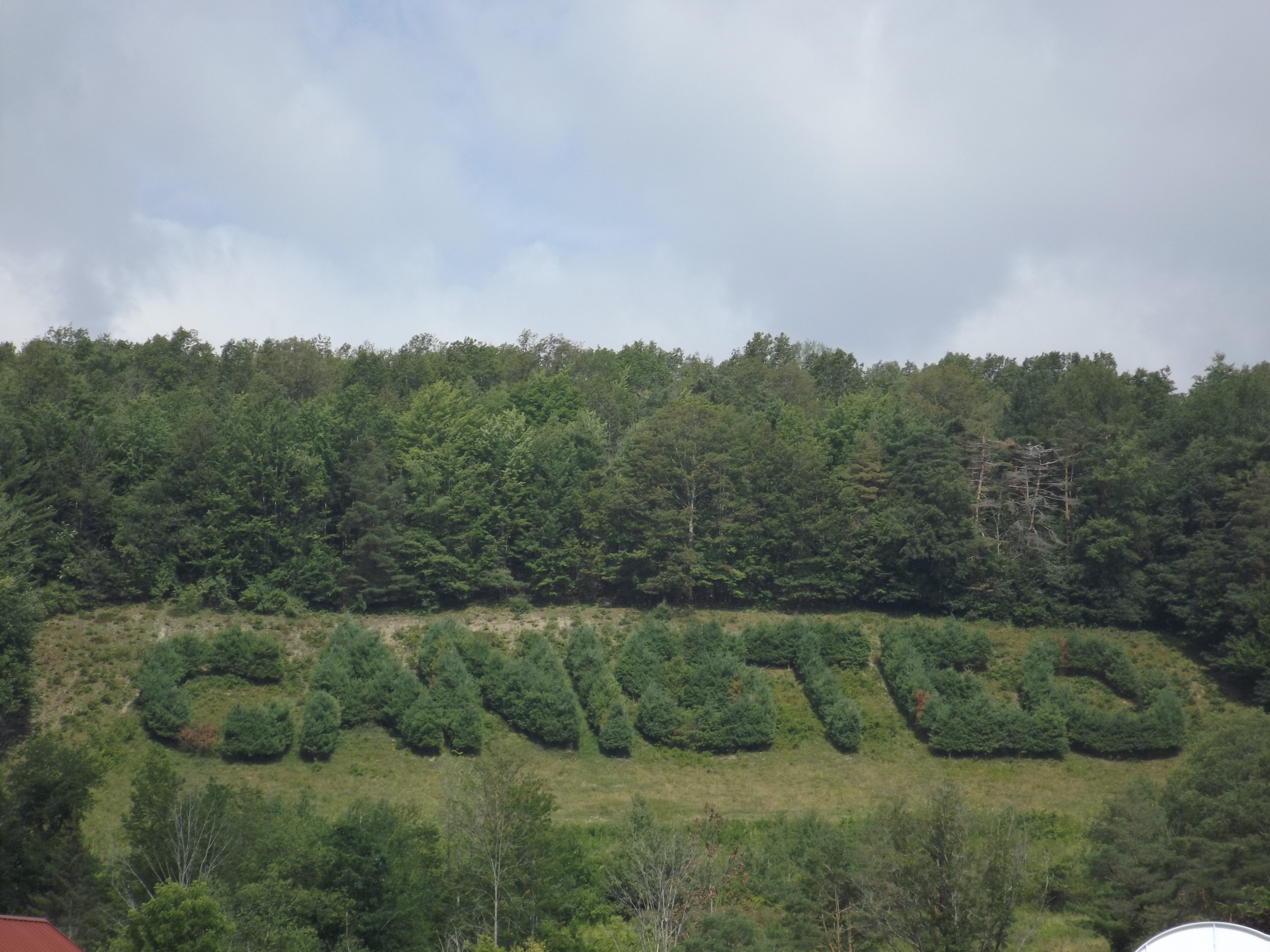
- Canisteo Living Sign, August 2023

- Location within New York Location within the United States
- Location: SE side of hill, N of Cemetery Rd. off Greenwood St., Canisteo, New York
- Coordinates: 42°15′59″N 77°36′53″W
- Area: less than one acre
- Built: 1933
- Built by: Harry C. Smith, Edwin M. Childs
- NRHP reference No.: 04000707
- Added to NRHP: July 16, 2004

The Canisteo Living Sign is a historic civic project that was built by Ed Childs and Harry Smith, donated to the Canisteo School District, that also served as a navigational aid, located at Canisteo in Steuben County, New York. The sign consists of a set of 260 pine trees that spell out the name "Canisteo." They occupy a space approximately 90 feet (27 m) long and 300 feet (91 m) wide. The sign was originally laid out in 1933. The sign was cleared in April 2016 and subsequently replanted beginning in May 2016 due to a number of dead and dying trees.

It was listed on the National Register of Historic Places in 2004.

The sign can be seen as an unconventional form of hillside letters.

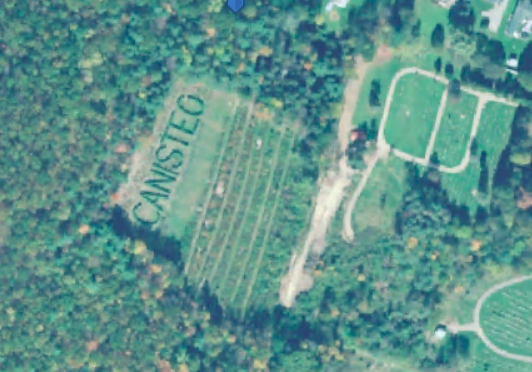
The sign seen from above
