= St. James Mercy Hospital =

Hospital in New York, United States

Coordinates: 42°21′19″N 77°39′48″W

St. James Mercy Hospital is a Voluntary non-profit - Church, Medicare Certified Acute Care Hospital with 157 beds, located in Hornell, New York.
