= Canisteo (village), New York =

Canisteo, New York
- Village
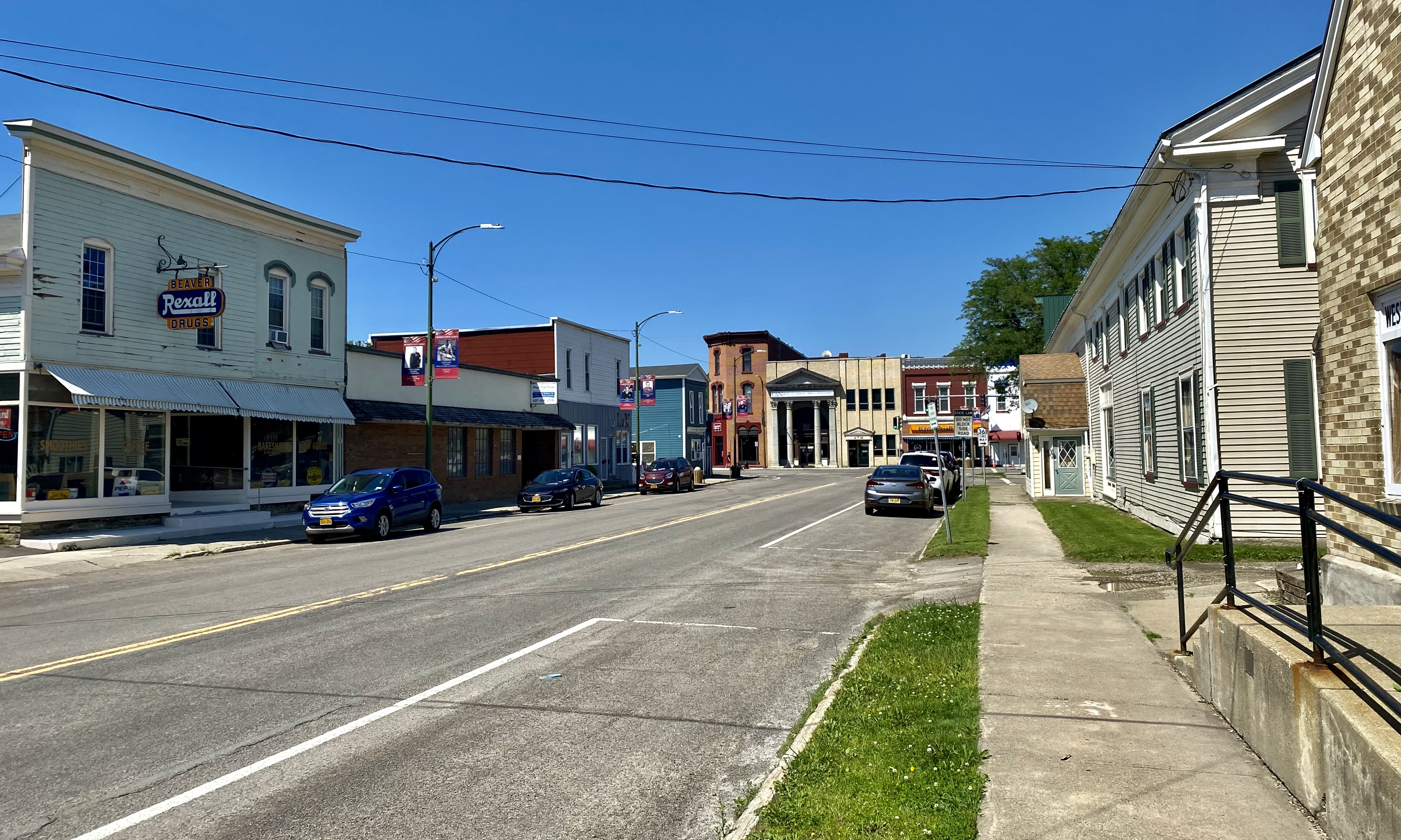
- Greenwood Street, looking north towards East Main Street, June 2021

- Location within the state of New York
- Coordinates: 42°16′13″N 77°36′24″W
- Country: United States
- State: New York
- County: Steuben

Area
  - Total: 0.93 sq mi (2.42 km^{2})
  - Land: 0.93 sq mi (2.42 km^{2})
  - Water: 0 sq mi (0.00 km^{2})
- Elevation: 1,135 ft (346 m)

Population (2020)
  - Total: 2,176
  - Density: 2,330.6/sq mi (899.84/km^{2})
- Time zone: UTC-5 (Eastern (EST))
  - Summer (DST): UTC-4 (EDT)
- ZIP code: 14823
- Area code: 607
- FIPS code: 36-12254
- GNIS feature ID: 0945774
- Website: https://villageofcanisteo.gov/

Canisteo (/ˌkænɪsˈtiːoʊ/) is a village in Steuben County, New York, United States. The population was 2,176 at the 2020 census.

The Village of Canisteo is in the northwest corner of the Town of Canisteo and is southeast of Hornell.

== History ==
=== Native Americans ===
Canisteo existed as a community prior to European settlement, but there are different versions of who the inhabitants were and what the settlement consisted of. In the seventeenth and eighteenth centuries Canisteo was in a remote area, between territories of the Seneca and Delaware Indians, "a sort of No Man's Land". There are references to a "Kanestio castle", but differing accounts of what it was, or even what was meant by "castle". One modern writer calls it "mysterious", noting that "facts about [it] are few and difficult to come by." A well-known version is that of Steuben County historian Harlo Hakes, published in 1896:

"Previous to the advent of the white man this town, and in fact the whole valley of the Canisteo, was the abiding place and favorite hunting and fishing grounds of the American Indians. The region was originally the land of the Senecas, but by sufferance the Delawares were permitted to occupy portions of it. We are told that within the limits of this town was once the Indian village of 'Kanestio,' where also lived a number of deserters from the British army and other renegades from the white settlements. The murder of two Dutch traders by these outlaws brought upon them the vengeance of Sir William Johnson, and the result was the destruction of their settlement."

"The Delaware Indian town which had been dignified by some writers with the name of 'Kanestio Castle'...is said to have contained about sixty hewed log houses, with stone chimneys in each, and to have been the home or seat of operations of a noted 'Delaware King,' known as At-weet-sera." The destruction of the Indian village took place in 1765.

=== European settlers ===
==== Colonial village of outlaws ====
According to William Stuart, "The history of Kanestio Castle constitutes the genesis of Steuben County". It is the first place in what became Steuben County to be mentioned in writing. Just what the word "castle" means is not clear, and precisely where it was is not known either. There is no mention of any castle in the European sense of a large stone building. It may mean nothing more than that it was a permanent, as opposed to transitory, settlement. The earliest description, from a French colonial historian of about 1690, is that Kanestio consisted of "'several score of houses built of timber, each having four stone chimneys, adjoining a natural meadow of several hundred arpents.' Kanestio Castle!". Another modern writer reports the same information as "a luxurious castle of logs, 26 feet (7.9 m) long by 24 feet (7.3 m) wide", now with four fireplaces. The stone chimneys are unquestionably a European artifact. The same French historian, describing an expedition south from what is today Kingston, Ontario, says that Kanestio was a community of European outlaws: ""A more worthless lot of renegades and villains, who had no hope of heaven or fear of hell, we never saw." They were from diverse backgrounds, and speaking different languages ("polyglot").

There is no further written reference to Kanestio for 72 years. In 1762 two Dutch traders, British subjects, were killed by "a brace of outlaws from the Castle," described in another source as "the Indians from Kanestio". Kanestio was then described as "the largest Delaware [Indian] town", but also according to the same source, it was "a village of lawless stragglers". The English governor Sir William Johnson, in response, sent a party of "Indians" and British troops in 1764, under the command of Andrew Montour. At Kanestio they "burned 60 good houses, a vast amount of corn, agricultural implements and saddles." The settlement at Kanestio Castle was eliminated.

An Indian village of Kanestio appears in the 1928 novel The Plains of Abraham, by James Curwood.

==== Early settlers ====
Settlers began arriving at what would become a new community around 1789. It was one of the first settlements in what is today Steuben County. Immigration and commerce were via what is today Pennsylvania, where the Canisteo River led to; there were no direct connections with Albany or New York City. The largest growth came after the Erie Railroad, which did provide a link to New York, arrived in 1851, when many factories opened. The village was incorporated in 1873.

The village of Canisteo was originally (prior to its incorporation) called Bennettsville. The original Canisteo, today a hamlet called Canisteo Center or Carson, was southeast of the present village, along the river. When the Erie Railroad was built in 1850, there was not room for a depot between the tracks and the Canisteo River, so the depot was built upriver, at the south of the tracks, on the west side of Depot Street. A "fairly large settlement", which disappeared in the twentieth century, grew up near the depot, on the north side of the river and tracks. Depot Street (renamed Railroad Street while the trolley ran down it) was built to connect the depot to the Canisteo House hotel. A large community, with businesses and shops, and other hotels, sprang up.

=== The railroad era ===
Railroad Street – Greenwood Street was in the nineteenth and early twentieth centuries the principal street of Canisteo. On an 1873 map, Main Street (neither East nor West) stretched from Railroad/Greenwood Street to what was later called Ordway Lane, where the street ended. In the other direction, one traveled north from Railroad/Greenwood Street along Hornellsville Street.

Until 1851, when the Erie Railroad began operations, traffic was via the Canisteo River. The Erie ended that traffic, although an undated picture, which must be post-Erie since it includes a bicycle, shows a horse-drawn "stage" making two trips a day to Hornell. Aside from that the Erie was the sole route until 1892, when the Hornellsville & Canisteo Railway (a trolley line) linked Canisteo with Hornell; the trolley passed by the Erie station, linking it via Depot Street with the center of Canisteo, over half a mile away. By road, the main connection was the Canisteo River Road, today (2019) Steuben County route 29 between Canisteo and Hornell, route 119 between Canisteo and Cameron. The new hard-surface road between Hornell and Canisteo that later became New York Route 36 was built in 1912. (That road was destroyed by Hurricane Agnes in 1972; the current four-lane route is higher up.) With the growth of automobiles this replaced the railroad, Depot St. declined in importance, and Hornellsville Street was turned into West Main Street and the former Main St. into East Main St. All Erie service to Canisteo ended in the 1940s; there were still freight trains, but none stopped in Canisteo.

The first manufacturer in the village was L. Allison's "large boot and shoe factory", founded in 1868.

A map with business notices from 1873 reveals that Canisteo had three physicians, one dentist, four attorneys, one tailor, one stable, a cooper, a foundry, three groceries and a meat market, and small manufacturers of shoes and boots, bee hives, a flour mill, a cheese factory, a rake factory, and some others. On Railroad Street (later Depot Street) was the Canisteo Steam Power Company, which manufactured steam engines and employed 10–12 workers. Perhaps it is because of it that Canisteo had a "Times Steam Print", the "Times" presumably a reference to the Canisteo Times, whose office was on Railroad Street.

In 1878 the manufactures of Canisteo amounted to a million dollars. At various times there were factories making buttons, rulers, dresses, signs, Superior registers, baskets, and car springs.

A picture from 1880 reveals that on the west side of Greenwood St. there was a bookstore run by Allison B. Laine. A J. H. Stewart owned, at 23 Main St. (later East Main St.) a store selling pianos, organs, and sheet music.

An American LaFrance fire engine was purchased in 1881. The Canisteo Water Works was built in 1887; the bandstand in the park in 1888.

In 1888 Canisteo was described as prosperous. "While the factories over the country are reducing the hours of labor her industries are wide-awake, and have more than enough to keep them running full time."

In the late 19th century Canisteo was a temperance community. This was seen as progressive.

In 1890 Canisteo had a professional baseball team.

In 1891 the Farmer's Co-Operative Insurance Company was organized in Canisteo, and grew to be "one of the most successful fire insurance companies in the state". The same clipping reveals that in 1925 there was a potato club in Canisteo, with a membership of 32 boys and the support of the Erie Railroad and "the state school of agriculture at Alfred".

In 1892, 20 arc lights were installed for street illumination.

A business directory of 1893 reports that: Canisteo "has a bank, weekly newspaper, four churches, well-equipped fire department, three hotels, and a first-class academy. Very few villages of its size have the industries equal to this place. The principal ones are the manufacturing of doors, sash and blinds, boots and shoes, leather, fence wire, incandescent lamps, hubs and spokes, washing machines, etc."

In 1898 Canisteo got gas from Hornell for heating, after an earlier experiment in generating it in Canisteo.

=== 20th century ===
Canisteo got telephone service about 1902. It got dial service about 1950; the original building, on Fifth St., is still (2015) in use. Numbers were four digits, beginning with 2- or 4-, and the only pay phone in town, in the school, with 8-. However, it was an isolated island until the commercial center of Hornell got dial service in 1963. To call Hornell, one dialed 3- for a Hornell operator. This is probably a reason why Hornell's exchange, 324, begins with a 3-. The only other dialable location was the hamlet of Cameron, whose exchange was accessed by dialing 5-, perhaps reflected in Cameron's exchange (607) 695-.

Presidential candidate William Jennings Bryan spoke in Canisteo in 1924.

To create parking for downtown merchants, in the 1950s The Green, Canisteo's central park, between East Main, Greenwood, South Main, and Maple Streets, was sacrificed. It had had an old-fashioned, huge drinking fountain; older photos show a small bandstand.

== Businesses and industries ==
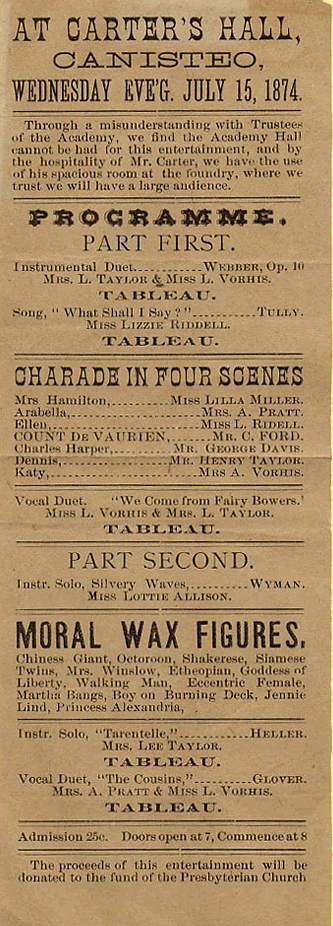
Handbill for an "entertainment" held at Carter's foundry in Canisteo, New York, 1874

A number of small manufacturing establishments existed along Depot Street in the nineteenth century; there were 10 factories in Canisteo in 1873. These included the Voorhis planing mill, a site later taken over by the Canisteo Sash & Door Company in 1885. These were located at the site of the present Canisteo trailer park (which replaced a waste materials company that occupied the site after the factory's closure). The Henry Carter and Son foundry, founded in 1873, renamed the Canisteo Steam Power Company, manufactured steam engines and many other metal products. In 1890, it employed 10 men.

The Tucker button factory was also located on Depot Street. In 1908 the factory was occupied by the Thomas Spring & Gear Company, which manufactured shock absorbers for Ford cars, using an invention patented by Charles L. Thomas of Canisteo.

Other manufacturers included the Canisteo Silk Mill, on Russell St., which in the 1920s had 200 employees and was the only such factory in the country. There was also a small sawmill, on Third St.; and Scott's Dairy, a milk processor, located on Depot St. near the rail line. Scott's had a small ice cream shop on the north side of West Main St.

For more information on and pictures of Canisteo's industries, and the fires which destroyed several of them, see Virginia Dickey's "The Canisteo of the 1890s".

Between 1894 and 1935, the offices, repair shop, and depot of the New York & Pennsylvania Railroad were located in Canisteo, where, until 1917, when passenger service was discontinued, there was also a staffed station, on the east side of the central park. On the west side of the central park was a stop of the Hornell Traction Company.

The Canisteo Theater, which closed in the 1950s, was a brick building on the west side of Greenwood St., demolished around 2000.

The only significant industry in Canisteo today is the Welles Bros. sign factory, which began operations in 1955 from a leased building, now (2015) abandoned, on Fifth Street; in 1967 it moved to its present (2015) building at 92 Depot St.

== Newspapers ==
- The Canisteo Reporter was being published in 1873, according to a map of that date. Editor and proprietor was J. D. Adams.
- The Canisteo Citizen was published from 1874 to 1875. Editor and proprietor was J. S. van Alstin. The Kanestio Historical Society has a copy of Volume 1, No. 2, dated March 11, 1874.
- The Canisteo Times, "an independent family journal, devoted to home interests", was published from 1875 to 1889. Editor and publisher was A. H. Bunnell. Another source says: "The Times was established in 1876 by S. H. Jennings and in April, 1886, was sold to F. B. Smith, who conducted it with ability and success." From 1889 to 1892 it was the Canisteo Weekly Times, "devoted to the interests of Canisteo first, last and all the time", and was edited and published by Frank B. Smith and Frank A. Fay. "In April, 1892, Mr. Frank A. Fay become the editor and publisher and made it the Prohibition organ of Steuben County. It attained a wide circulation and exerted a powerful influence in promulgating temperance and good order.... On account of poor health, in January, 1900, he disposed of his interest in the Times to J. C. Latham, who is now its editor and proprietor. It is now published in the interest of the Republican party; has twelve pages, and is issued weekly." The Canisteo Times continued to be published until 1957, from an office and small plant on the west side of Depot Street. Descendants of J.C. Latham were the publishers.
- In 1892 Fay resumed publication of the Canisteo Times, which was acquired by J. Claude Latham and became the weekly Times-Republican from 1900–1908.
- "The Canisteo Tidings, at its inception in 1890, was published at Troupsburg, Steuben County, as The Farmers' Weekly, by Elmer E. Reynolds. The plant and paper were removed to Canisteo in 1894. It was last published by James N. Osincup and Clarence C. Potter, but it did not retain its patronage in the locality where it was established, and is not now [1896] in circulation."
- The weekly Canisteo Chronicle "was born in 1900, to Leon Hough, a grandson of Edwin Hough, the famous old printer, founder and long-time editor and publisher of the Hornellsville Tribune, the pioneer newspaper of the upper Painted Post country. The newspaper germ appears to be alive, active and at work in this family. Part of the material, presses and equipment of the formerly vigorous and extensively circulated Herald, of Hornell, is used in the Chronicle office." End date is unknown.

The Canisteo Express (Addison, 1850), the Canisteo Valley Journal (Hornellsville, 1858–1862), and the Canisteo Valley Times (Hornellsville, 1867–?) were not published within the current (2020) Town of Canisteo.

== Schools ==
In the Village of Canisteo are located the Canisteo-Greenwood Elementary, Middle, and High Schools. (See Town of Canisteo.)

== Transportation ==
The former Erie Railroad began operations in 1851. The line passed to the east of Canisteo, and passenger service was provided, though ending in the 1940s; the depot stood vacant for decades before being demolished. From 1892 to 1926 the Hornellsville and Canisteo Railway linked Hornell via the Erie depot in Canisteo with the center of Canisteo. It was replaced by bus service, although there have been gaps when no public transportation was available. From 1896 to 1936, the New York & Pennsylvania Railroad (not to be confused with the Western New York and Pennsylvania Railway) started at the depot and ran south toward Rexville.

Around 1900, the Erie Railroad had 10 passenger trains each day, the New York & Pennsylvania had 3, and the trolley had 20. In 1891 the New York, Lake Erie and Western Railroad had 3 eastbound and 4 westbound trains per day. In 1892, Canisteo was the terminus of the route to Olean of the Central New York and Western Railway, which bought the assets of the bankrupt Lackawanna and Southwestern Railway Company.

== Flood control system ==
The village of Canisteo was severely impacted by the flood of July 1935, until that time the greatest since modern settlement began. Using federal funding, two levees were constructed, one beginning on the northwest of the village, ending on the southeast, protecting it from the Canisteo River. The other was built to the east of the village, protecting it from Bennett's Creek and Purdy Creek. Bennett's Creek, which formerly ran through the village, about where Bennett St. is now (2019), was rerouted; this added the land with Elm Street, which street does not exist on early maps. The current bridges of Route 36 over Bennett's Creek and Route 248 over Purdy Creek were also constructed as part of this project, as was the village's sewer system. The only flooding in the village since this construction was a result of Hurricane Agnes, in 1972, at which time the Canisteo River reached its highest recorded height.

== Living sign ==
The village is home of the "world famous living sign" which was once featured in a Ripley's "Believe it or Not!" book. The sign spells out the name of the village in Scots Pine trees and has been around for more than fifty years. It is viewable from Greenwood Street near the elementary school. The sign, which has almost a perfect North/South axis, is still used by the armed services to orient true north when flying over it. The Canisteo Living Sign was listed on the National Register of Historic Places in 2004.

== USS Canisteo ==
A US Navy fleet oil frigate (AO-99) once held the name USS Canisteo. It was utilized until the 1990s and even served time as part of the Cuban blockade during the missile crisis of the 1960s. The ship's official motto was "If freedom were easy we wouldn't be here". See USS Canisteo (AO-99).

== Steamer Canisteo ==
In the 1890s, a steamer named Canisteo operated on the Great Lakes.

== Canisteo Peninsula, Antarctica ==
The Canisteo Peninsula is an ice-covered peninsula in Antarctica.

== Geography ==
Canisteo is located at 42°16′12″N 77°36′23″W (42.270178, -77.606616).

According to the United States Census Bureau, the village has a total area of 1.0 square miles (2.5 km^{2}), all land.

The village is located at the junction of New York State Route 36 and New York State Route 248. County Route 28 joins New York State Route 36 south of the village and County Route 119 passes the north side of Canisteo.

The Canisteo River, flowing southeasterly, passes the northern side of the village, where it is joined by Bennetts Creek.

== Demographics ==
Historical population
Census	Pop.	Note	%±
1860	300		—
1880	1,907		—
1890	2,071		8.6%
1900	2,077		0.3%
1910	2,259		8.8%
1920	2,201		−2.6%
1930	2,548		15.8%
1940	2,550		0.1%
1950	2,625		2.9%
1960	2,731		4.0%
1970	2,772		1.5%
1980	2,679		−3.4%
1990	2,421		−9.6%
2000	2,336		−3.5%
2010	2,270		−2.8%
2020	2,176		−4.1%
U.S. Decennial Census

As of the census of 2000, there were 2,336 people, 948 households, and 626 families residing in the village. The population density was 2,415.1 inhabitants per square mile (932.5/km^{2}). There were 1,024 housing units at an average density of 1,058.7 per square mile (408.8/km^{2}). The racial makeup of the village was 98.16% White, 0.21% Black or African American, 0.17% Native American, 0.51% Asian, 0.26% from other races, and 0.68% from two or more races. Hispanic or Latino of any race were 1.16% of the population.

There were 948 households, out of which 29.6% had children under the age of 18 living with them, 51.2% were married couples living together, 10.5% had a female householder with no husband present, and 33.9% were non-families. 29.2% of all households were made up of individuals, and 15.4% had someone living alone who was 65 years of age or older. The average household size was 2.46 and the average family size was 3.04.

In the village, the population was spread out, with 26.6% under the age of 18, 7.1% from 18 to 24, 24.8% from 25 to 44, 25.5% from 45 to 64, and 15.9% who were 65 years of age or older. The median age was 39 years. For every 100 females, there were 89.5 males. For every 100 females age 18 and over, there were 85.9 males.

The median income for a household in the village was $32,269, and the median income for a family was $42,560. Males had a median income of $31,129 versus $22,857 for females. The per capita income for the village was $14,818. About 7.8% of families and 10.6% of the population were below the poverty line, including 8.9% of those under age 18 and 3.1% of those age 65 or over.

== Sister cities ==
The following city has been identified as a sister city of Canisteo by Sister Cities International:

- Wauchope, New South Wales, Australia

== See also ==
- Glenwood Inn
- Hornell Traction Company
- McBurney House
- New York & Pennsylvania Railroad
