= Rexville, New York =

- Hamlet
- Location within New York Location within the United States
- Coordinates: 42°05′03″N 77°39′44″W
- Country: United States
- State: New York
- County: Steuben
- Elevation: 1,841 ft (561 m)
- Time zone: UTC-5 (Eastern (EST))
  - Summer (DST): UTC-4 (EDT)
- ZIP code: 14877
- Area code: 607
- GNIS feature ID: 962422

Rexville is a hamlet in Steuben County, New York, United States. The community is located along New York State Route 248, 13.2 miles (21.2 km) south-southwest of Canisteo. Rexville has a post office with ZIP code 14877, which opened on July 10, 1855.
