= Canisteo Center, New York =

Canisteo Center, New York Center Canisteo, New York Carson, New York
- Hamlet
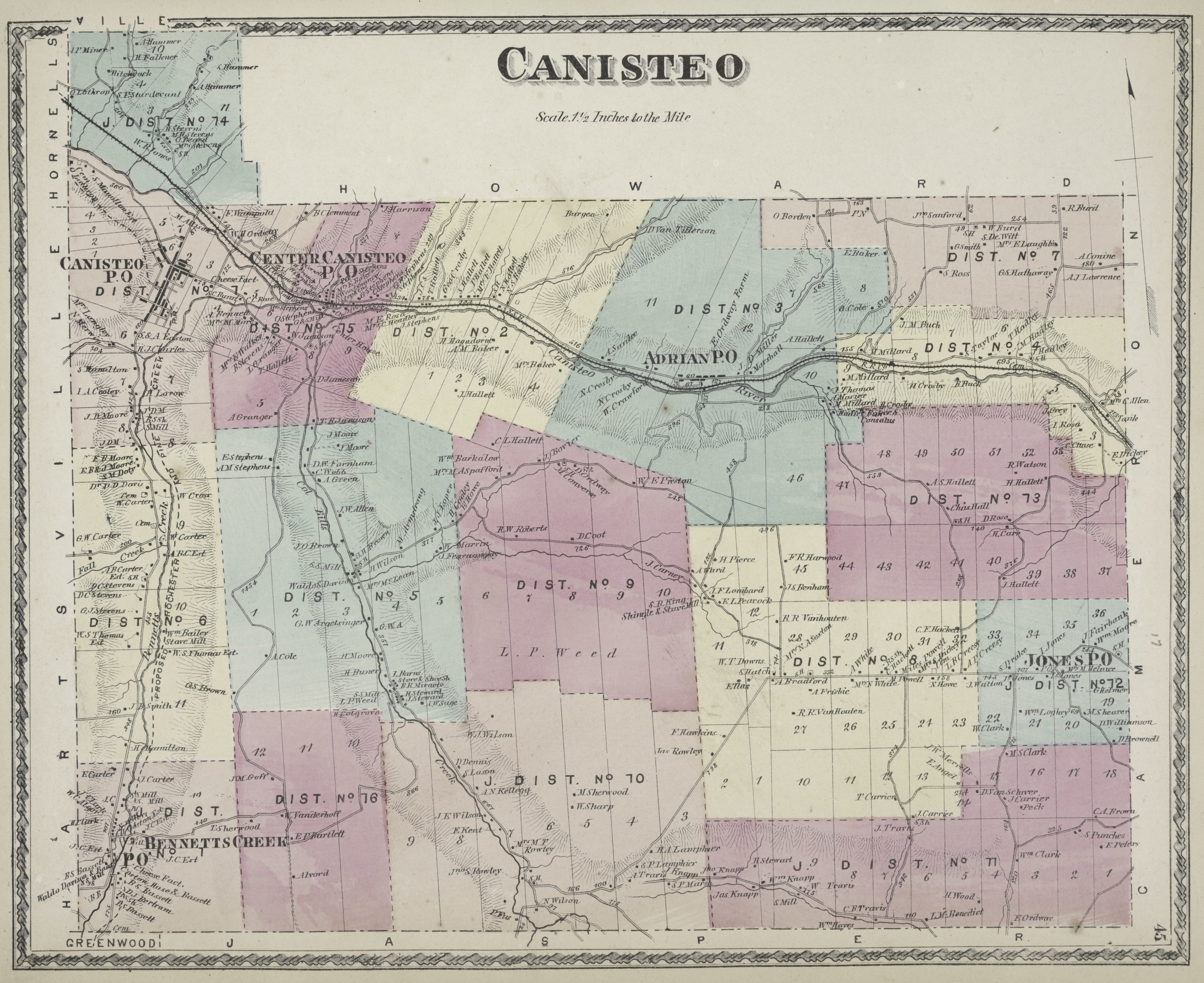
- 1873 map showing Canisteo Center (then called Center Canisteo)

- Location in New York Location in United States
- Coordinates: 42°15′56″N 77°34′44″W
- Country: United States
- State: New York
- County: Steuben
- Elevation: 1,135 ft (346 m)
- Time zone: UTC-5 (Eastern (EST))
  - Summer (DST): UTC-4 (EDT)
- ZIP code: 14823
- Area code: 607

Canisteo Center, New York is the original location of the Village of Canisteo, at the intersection of Canisteo River Road and Steuben County road 119. It was never incorporated.

When the Erie Railroad was built about 1860, there was not room for a depot between the tracks and the Canisteo River, so the depot (vacant for decades and demolished in the late 20th century) was built two miles upriver. The Village of Canisteo reestablished itself near the depot.

Canisteo Center had a post office, called Center Canisteo, from 1851 to 1876. Since the 19th century Canisteo Center has been a hamlet.

So as to avoid confusion with Canisteo, in the later 20th century Canisteo Center was given the name of Carter.
