= Canisteo Township, Dodge County, Minnesota =

Canisteo Township, Minnesota
- Township
- Location within the state of Minnesota Canisteo Township, Minnesota (the United States)
- Coordinates: 43°58′54″N 92°44′4″W
- Country: United States
- State: Minnesota
- County: Dodge

Area
  - Total: 35.9 sq mi (92.9 km^{2})
  - Land: 35.9 sq mi (92.9 km^{2})
  - Water: 0 sq mi (0.0 km^{2})
- Elevation: 1,230 ft (375 m)

Population (2000)
  - Total: 662
  - Density: 18/sq mi (7.1/km^{2})
- Time zone: UTC-6 (Central (CST))
  - Summer (DST): UTC-5 (CDT)
- ZIP code: 55944
- Area code: 507
- FIPS code: 27-09640
- GNIS feature ID: 0663740

Canisteo Township is a township in Dodge County, Minnesota, United States. The population was 662 at the 2000 census.

== History ==
Canisteo Township was organized in 1858. A large share of the first settlers being natives of Canisteo, New York caused the name to be selected.

== Geography ==
According to the United States Census Bureau, the township has a total area of 35.9 square miles (93 km^{2}), all land.

== Demographics ==
As of the census of 2000, there were 662 people, 225 households, and 191 families residing in the township. The population density was 18.4 inhabitants per square mile (7.1/km^{2}). There were 229 housing units at an average density of 6.4 per square mile (2.5/km^{2}). The racial makeup of the township was 97.58% White, 2.11% Asian, 0.30% from other races. Hispanic or Latino of any race were 2.11% of the population.

There were 225 households, out of which 40.9% had children under the age of 18 living with them, 77.8% were married couples living together, 3.1% had a female householder with no husband present, and 14.7% were non-families. 12.4% of all households were made up of individuals, and 5.8% had someone living alone who was 65 years of age or older. The average household size was 2.94 and the average family size was 3.20.

In the township the population was spread out, with 30.5% under the age of 18, 6.8% from 18 to 24, 26.1% from 25 to 44, 26.9% from 45 to 64, and 9.7% who were 65 years of age or older. The median age was 37 years. For every 100 females, there were 102.4 males. For every 100 females age 18 and over, there were 106.3 males.

The median income for a household in the township was $53,750, and the median income for a family was $57,708. Males had a median income of $36,500 versus $26,667 for females. The per capita income for the township was $21,889. About 3.1% of families and 3.2% of the population were below the poverty line, including 3.6% of those under age 18 and 3.5% of those age 65 or over.
