= List of places in New York: A =

This list of current cities, towns, unincorporated communities, counties, and other recognized places in the U.S. state of New York also includes information on the number and names of counties in which the place lies, and its lower and upper zip code bounds, if applicable.

List of places in New York: A | B | C | D | E | F | G | H | I | J | K | L | M | N | O | P | Q | R | S | T | U | V | W | X | Y | Z

Name of place	County(ies)	Zip code(s)
Abbott Road	Erie County	
Abbotts	Cattaraugus County	14727
Abell Corners	Madison County	
Academy	Albany County	12208
Academy	Ontario County	14424
Accord (CDP)	Ulster County	12404
Acidalia	Sullivan County	12760
Acra	Greene County	12405
Adams (town)	Jefferson County	13605
Adams (village)	Jefferson County	13605
Adams Basin	Monroe County	14410
Adams Center (CDP)	Jefferson County	13606
Adams Corners	Putnam County	10579
Adams Cove	Jefferson County	13634
Adamsville	Washington County	12827
Addison (town)	Steuben County	14801
Addison (village)	Steuben County	14801
Addison Hill	Steuben County	14801
Adelphi	Kings County	11238
Aden	Sullivan County	
Adirondack	Warren County	12808
Adrian	Steuben County	14823
Afton (town)	Chenango County	13730
Afton (village)	Chenango County	13730
Afton Lake	Chenango County	13730
Agnes Corners	Oneida County	
Agway Station	Orange County	
Aiden Lair	Essex County	
Air City	Oneida County	
Airmont	Rockland County	10901
Airmont Heights	Rockland County	10901
Akins Corners	Putnam County	12563
Akron	Erie County	14001
Akron Junction	Erie County	
Alabama	Genesee County	14003
Albany	Albany County	12201 – 12299
Albany County Airport	Albany County	12211
Albany Medical Center	Albany County	12208
Albertson	Nassau County	11507
Albia	Rensselaer County	12180
Albion (town)	Orleans County	14411
Albion (village)	Orleans County	14411
Albion (town)	Oswego County	
Albion Center (hamlet)	Oswego County	
Alburg	Franklin County	12916
Alcove	Albany County	12007
Alden	Erie County	14004
Alden Bend	Clinton County	12910
Alden Center	Erie County	14004
Alden Manor	Nassau County	11003
Alder Bend	Clinton County	12910
Alder Brook	Franklin County	
Alder Creek	Oneida County	13301
Aldrich	St. Lawrence County	
Alene	Madison County	
Alexander (town)	Genesee County	14005
Alexander (village)	Genesee County	14005
Alexandria	Jefferson County	
Alexandria Bay	Jefferson County	13607
Alexandria Center	Jefferson County	
Alfred (town)	Allegany County	14802
Alfred (village)	Allegany County	14802
Alfred Station	Allegany County	14803
Algona	Jefferson County	
Alice	Steuben County	
Allaben	Ulster County	12480
Allard Corners	Orange County	12586
Allegany	Cattaraugus County	14706
Allegany Indian Reservation	Cattaraugus County	14204
Allen	Allegany County	
Allen Center	Allegany County	14735
Allen Corners	Putnam County	
Allendale	Jefferson County	13605
Allens Hill	Ontario County	14469
Allentown (hamlet)	Allegany County	14707
Allentown (hamlet)	Saratoga County	
Allenwood	Nassau County	11021
Allerton	Bronx County	10467
Alligerville	Ulster County	12440
Alloway	Wayne County	14489
Alma	Allegany County	14708
Almond	Allegany County	14804
Almond	Steuben County	14804
Aloquin	Ontario County	14561
Alpina	Lewis County	
Alpine	Schuyler County	14805
Alpine Junction	Schuyler County	
Alplaus	Schenectady County	12008
Alps	Rensselaer County	12018
Alsen	Greene County	12415
Altamont	Albany County	12009
Altay	Schuyler County	14837
Altmar	Oswego County	13302
Alton	Wayne County	14413
Altona (town)	Clinton County	12910
Altona (CDP)	Clinton County	12910
Alverson	Jefferson County	
Amagansett	Suffolk County	11930
Amawalk	Westchester County	10501
Amber	Onondaga County	13110
Ambierville	Chenango County	13843
Amblerville	Chenango County	
Amboy	Onondaga County	13031
Amboy	Oswego County	
Amboy Center	Oswego County	13493
Amchir	Orange County	10940
Amenia	Dutchess County	12501
Amenia Union	Dutchess County	12501
American Dock Terminal	Richmond County	
Ames	Montgomery County	13317
Amherst	Erie County	14226
Amity	Allegany County	
Amity	Orange County	10990
Amity Harbor	Suffolk County	11701
Amityville	Suffolk County	11701
Amsdell Heights	Erie County	14075
Amsterdam	Montgomery County	12010
Anaquassacook	Washington County	
Ancram	Columbia County	12502
Ancramdale	Columbia County	12503
Anderson	Sullivan County	
Andes	Delaware County	13731
Andover	Allegany County	14806
Andrea Park Estates	Westchester County	10598
Angelica (town)	Allegany County	14709
Angelica (village)	Allegany County	14709
Angola	Erie County	14006
Angola Lake Shore	Erie County	14006
Angola Lake Shore Addition	Erie County	
Angola on the Lake	Erie County	14006
Angus	Yates County	
Annadale	Richmond County	
Annandale-on-Hudson	Dutchess County	12504
Annsville	Oneida County	
Annsville	Westchester County	10566
Ansonia	New York County	10023
Antrim	Rockland County	
Antwerp	Jefferson County	13608
Apalachin	Tioga County	13732
Apaquogue	Suffolk County	
Apex	Delaware County	13783
Appalachian National Scenic Trail	Dutchess County; Orange County	25425
Applegate Corner	Tompkins County	
Appleton	Niagara County	14008
Apulia	Onondaga County	13020
Apulia Station	Onondaga County	13020
Aquebogue	Suffolk County	11931
Aqueduct	Schenectady County	12309
Aquetuck	Albany County	12143
Arabia	Delaware County	
Arabia	Schoharie County	
Arcade	Wyoming County	14009
Arcade Junction	Wyoming County	14009
Arcadia	Wayne County	
Arcadia Hills	Orange County	
Archdale	Washington County	12834
Archville	Westchester County	10510
Arctic	Delaware County	
Arden	Orange County	10910
Arden House	Orange County	10926
Ardonia	Ulster County	12515
Ardsley	Westchester County	10502
Ardsley-on-Hudson	Westchester County	10503
Arena	Delaware County	
Argo Village	Nassau County	11003
Argusville	Schoharie County	13459
Argyle	Washington County	12809
Arietta	Hamilton County	12139
Aristotle	Allegany County	
Arkport	Steuben County	14807
Arkville	Delaware County	12406
Arkwright	Chautauqua County	
Arlington	Dutchess County	12603
Arlyn Oaks	Nassau County	11758
Armonk	Westchester County	10504
Armor	Erie County	14075
Army Pictorial Center	Queens County	11101
Arnett	Monroe County	
Arnolds Mill	Columbia County	
Arrochar	Richmond County	10305
Arsenal Hill	Ontario County	
Arshamonaque	Suffolk County	
Arthur	Oswego County	
Arthur Manor	Westchester County	10583
Arthursburg	Dutchess County	12533
Art Village	Suffolk County	
Arverne	Queens County	11692
Asbury	Tompkins County	
Asbury	Ulster County	
Ashantee	Livingston County	14414
Asharoken	Suffolk County	11768
Ashford	Cattaraugus County	14731
Ashford Hollow	Cattaraugus County	14171
Ash Grove	Washington County	
Ashland	Cayuga County	
Ashland	Chemung County	
Ashland	Greene County	12407
Ashokan	Ulster County	12481
Ashville	Chautauqua County	14710
Ashville Bay	Chautauqua County	14710
Ashwood	Orleans County	14098
Assembly Park	Onondaga County	
Assembly Point	Warren County	12845
Association Island	Jefferson County	13651
Astoria	Queens County	11102
Athens	Greene County	12015
Athol	Warren County	12810
Athol Springs	Erie County	14010
Atlanta	Steuben County	14808
Atlantic	Richmond County	10307
Atlantic Beach	Nassau County	11509
Atlantic Terminal	Kings County	
Atlantique	Suffolk County	11706
Attica	Genesee County, Wyoming County	14011
Attica Center	Wyoming County	14011
Attlebury	Dutchess County	12581
Atwater	Cayuga County	13081
Atwell	Herkimer County	13338
Atwell Corners	Madison County	
Atwood	Ulster County	12484
Auburn	Cayuga County	13021
Auburndale	Queens County	
Auburn Junction	Tompkins County	
Auburn Southeast	Cayuga County	13021
Audubon	New York County	10032
Augusta	Oneida County	13425
Aurelius	Cayuga County	
Auriesville	Montgomery County	12016
Aurora	Cayuga County	13026
Aurora	Erie County	
Aurora Tract	Onondaga County	13088
Au Sable	Clinton County	
Ausable Chasm	Clinton County	12911
Au Sable Forks	Clinton County, Essex County	12912
Austerlitz	Columbia County	12017
Austin	Cayuga County	
Ava	Oneida County	13303
Averill Park, New York	Rensselaer County	12018
Averyville	Essex County	
Avoca (town)	Steuben County	14809
Avoca (village)	Steuben County	14809
Avon	Livingston County	14414
Awosting	Ulster County	
Axeville	Cattaraugus County	14726
Axton Landing	Franklin County	
