= West Almond, New York =

- Town
- Location within New York Location within the United States
- Coordinates: 42°18′20″N 77°53′16″W
- Country: United States
- State: New York
- County: Allegany

Government
  - Type: Town Council
  - Town Supervisor: Trevor Burt (R)
  - Town Council: Members' List: • Kelly Bourne (R); • Albert Hall (R); • Mark Bainbridge (); •

Area
  - Total: 36.09 sq mi (93.47 km^{2})
  - Land: 36.00 sq mi (93.23 km^{2})
  - Water: 0.097 sq mi (0.25 km^{2})
- Elevation: 1,801 ft (549 m)

Population (2020)
  - Total: 280 ▼
  - Estimate (2021): 279
  - Density: 9.1/sq mi (3.52/km^{2})
- Time zone: UTC-5 (Eastern (EST))
  - Summer (DST): UTC-4 (EDT)
- ZIP Codes: 14804 (Almond); 14709 (Angelica); 14803 (Alfred Station); 14813 (Belmont)
- FIPS code: 36-003-79202
- GNIS feature ID: 0979617
- Website: www.westalmondny.org

West Almond is a town in Allegany County, New York, United States. The population was 280 at the 2020 census. West Almond is centrally located in the eastern part of the county and is west of Hornell.

== History ==
The area was first settled around 1816. The town of West Almond was created in 1835 from parts of the towns of Almond, Alfred, and Angelica.

The West Almond Churches were listed on the National Register of Historic Places in 1985.

== Geography ==
According to the United States Census Bureau, the town has a total area of 36.1 square miles (93.5 km^{2}), of which 36.0 square miles (93.2 km^{2}) is land and 0.077 square miles (0.2 km^{2}), or 0.26%, is water.

The Southern Tier Expressway (Interstate 86 and New York State Route 17) passes through the central part of the town.

== Demographics ==
Historical population
Census	Pop.	Note	%±
1840	808		—
1850	976		20.8%
1860	935		−4.2%
1870	799		−14.5%
1880	803		0.5%
1890	649		−19.2%
1900	601		−7.4%
1910	458		−23.8%
1920	416		−9.2%
1930	391		−6.0%
1940	390		−0.3%
1950	320		−17.9%
1960	293		−8.4%
1970	213		−27.3%
1980	357		67.6%
1990	277		−22.4%
2000	353		27.4%
2010	334		−5.4%
2020	280		−16.2%
2021 (est.)	279		−0.4%
U.S. Decennial Census

As of the census of 2000, there were 353 people, 130 households, and 96 families residing in the town. The population density was 9.8 inhabitants per square mile (3.8/km^{2}). There were 313 housing units at an average density of 8.7 per square mile (3.4/km^{2}). The racial makeup of the town was 97.73% White, 1.42% Native American, 0.28% Asian, and 0.57% from two or more races. Hispanic or Latino of any race were 1.42% of the population.

There were 130 households, out of which 36.9% had children under the age of 18 living with them, 61.5% were married couples living together, 7.7% had a female householder with no husband present, and 25.4% were non-families. 19.2% of all households were made up of individuals, and 6.9% had someone living alone who was 65 years of age or older. The average household size was 2.72 and the average family size was 3.11.

In the town, the population was spread out, with 29.7% under the age of 18, 4.2% from 18 to 24, 28.6% from 25 to 44, 23.8% from 45 to 64, and 13.6% who were 65 years of age or older. The median age was 38 years. For every 100 females, there were 117.9 males. For every 100 females age 18 and over, there were 108.4 males.

The median income for a household in the town was $43,125, and the median income for a family was $38,750. Males had a median income of $31,364 versus $22,188 for females. The per capita income for the town was $17,358. About 5.4% of families and 6.6% of the population were below the poverty line, including 9.5% of those under age 18 and 8.8% of those age 65 or over.

== Communities and locations in West Almond ==
- Angelica Creek – A stream that flows to the west past West Almond.
- Bennetts – A hamlet located in the northwest part of the town on County Road 16.
- West Almond – The hamlet of West Almond, located on County Road 2 in the eastern part of the town.
