= Birdsall, New York =

- Town
- Location within New York Location within the United States
- Coordinates: 42°23′34″N 77°54′27″W
- Country: United States
- State: New York
- County: Allegany

Government
  - Type: Town Council
  - Town Supervisor: Cynthia U. Gowiski (D, R)
  - Town Council: Members' List: • Jonathan Temple (); • Franklin Kellogg (D, R); • Kim Shaklee (D, R); • Denis Davis (R)

Area
  - Total: 36.06 sq mi (93.39 km^{2})
  - Land: 35.89 sq mi (92.95 km^{2})
  - Water: 0.17 sq mi (0.44 km^{2})
- Elevation: 2,106 ft (642 m)

Population (2020)
  - Total: 190
  - Estimate: 225
  - Density: 6.3/sq mi (2.42/km^{2})
- Time zone: UTC-5 (Eastern (EST))
  - Summer (DST): UTC-4 (EDT)
- ZIP Codes: 14709 (Angelica); 14804 (Almond); 14807 (Arkport); 14822 (Canaseraga)
- FIPS code: 36-003-06717
- GNIS feature ID: 0978735
- Website: Town of Birdsall

Birdsall is a town in Allegany County, New York, United States. The population was 221 at the 2010 census. The town is named after John Birdsall, a circuit judge. Birdsall is in the northeast part of Allegany County.

== History ==
The area that is now Birdsall was first settled circa 1816. The town of Birdsall was created in 1829 from parts of the towns of Almond and Allen.

From 1882 to April 1, 1947, Birdsall was located on the main line of the Pittsburg, Shawmut & Northern Railroad and predecessors. It was abandoned on the latter date by the U. S. Interstate Commerce Commission to promote the use of highway truck transportation in the area.

In 1980, the Fire Department of Birdsall was started by William Timberlake. He and Dale Wheeler were able to get the first fire truck donated from the Egypt, New York Fire Department for $1.

== Geography ==
According to the United States Census Bureau, the town has a total area of 36.1 square miles (93.4 km^{2}), of which 35.9 square miles (93.0 km^{2}) is land and 0.15 square miles (0.4 km^{2}), or 0.47%, is water.

== Demographics ==
Historical population
Census	Pop.	Note	%±
1830	543		—
1840	328		−39.6%
1850	597		82.0%
1860	909		52.3%
1870	755		−16.9%
1880	890		17.9%
1890	883		−0.8%
1900	634		−28.2%
1910	568		−10.4%
1920	464		−18.3%
1930	364		−21.6%
1940	306		−15.9%
1950	249		−18.6%
1960	160		−35.7%
1970	175		9.4%
1980	257		46.9%
1990	232		−9.7%
2000	268		15.5%
2010	221		−17.5%
2020	190		−14.0%
U.S. Decennial Census

As of the census of 2000, there were 268 people, 111 households, and 72 families residing in the town. The population density was 7.5 people per square mile (2.9 people/km^{2}). There were 229 housing units at an average density of 6.4 units per square mile (2.5 units/km^{2}). The racial makeup of the town was 96.64% White, 1.87% African American, 0.37% Native American, and 1.12% from two or more races. Hispanic or Latino of any race were 0.75% of the population.

There were 111 households, out of which 24.3% had children under the age of 18 living with them, 49.5% were married couples living together, 7.2% had a female householder with no husband present, and 35.1% were non-families. 25.2% of all households were made up of individuals, and 9.0% had someone living alone who was 65 years of age or older. The average household size was 2.41 and the average family size was 2.90.

In the town, the population was spread out, with 21.3% under the age of 18, 5.6% from 18 to 24, 25.4% from 25 to 44, 32.5% from 45 to 64, and 15.3% who were 65 years of age or older. The median age was 43 years. For every 100 females, there were 106.2 males. For every 100 females age 18 and over, there were 99.1 males.

The median income for a household in the town was $21,705, and the median income for a family was $31,250. Males had a median income of $29,286 versus $22,500 for females. The per capita income for the town was $12,859. About 17.2% of families and 28.8% of the population were below the poverty line, including 50.0% of those under the age of eighteen and none of those 65 or over.

== Communities and locations in the Town of Birdsall ==
- Birdsall – The hamlet of Birdsall is on County Road 16 (Dalton Road) in the western half of the town.
- Black Creek – A stream that flows past Birdsall village.
- Grove – A hamlet at the north town line.
- Hiltonville – A location near the eastern town line.
- Keaney Swamp – An extensive bog near the northern town line.
- Scholes – A location by the south town line on County Road 16 (Dalton Road).
