= Albion, New York =

Albion may refer to the following places in the U.S. state of New York:

- Albion (town), Orleans County, New York
- Albion (village), New York, most of which is in the town above
- Albion, Oswego County, New York, a town

== See also ==
- New Albion, New York
