= Albion Center, New York =

Hamlet in the state of New York, United States

Albion Center
- hamlet
- Location within the state of New York Albion Center (the United States)
- Coordinates: 43°29′19″N 76°02′30″W
- Country: United States
- State: New York
- County: Oswego
- City: Albion
- Time zone: UTC-5 (Eastern (EST))
  - Summer (DST): UTC-4 (EDT)
- ZIP codes: 13303
- Area code: 315

Albion Center is a hamlet southwest of Altmar, in the town of Albion in Oswego County, New York, United States. It consists of a dozen private homes, mostly along County Route 22.

The most prominent site in the community is the Altmar State Forest.
