= John Tuttle (athlete) =

American long-distance runner

Personal information
- Born: November 16, 1958 (age 67) Alfred, New York, United States

Sport
- Sport: Long-distance running
- Event: Marathon

John Tuttle (born November 16, 1958) is an American long-distance runner. He finished third in the Olympic Marathon Trial in Buffalo, New York on May 26, 1984. He then competed in the marathon at the 1984 Summer Olympics.

== Biography ==
John Tuttle graduated Alfred-Almond High School in Alfred, New York in 1977. He then attended Auburn University where he ran won five titles at the All-Southeastern Conference for cross-country.
