= Cora Belle Brewster =

American physician

Cora Belle Brewster M.D.
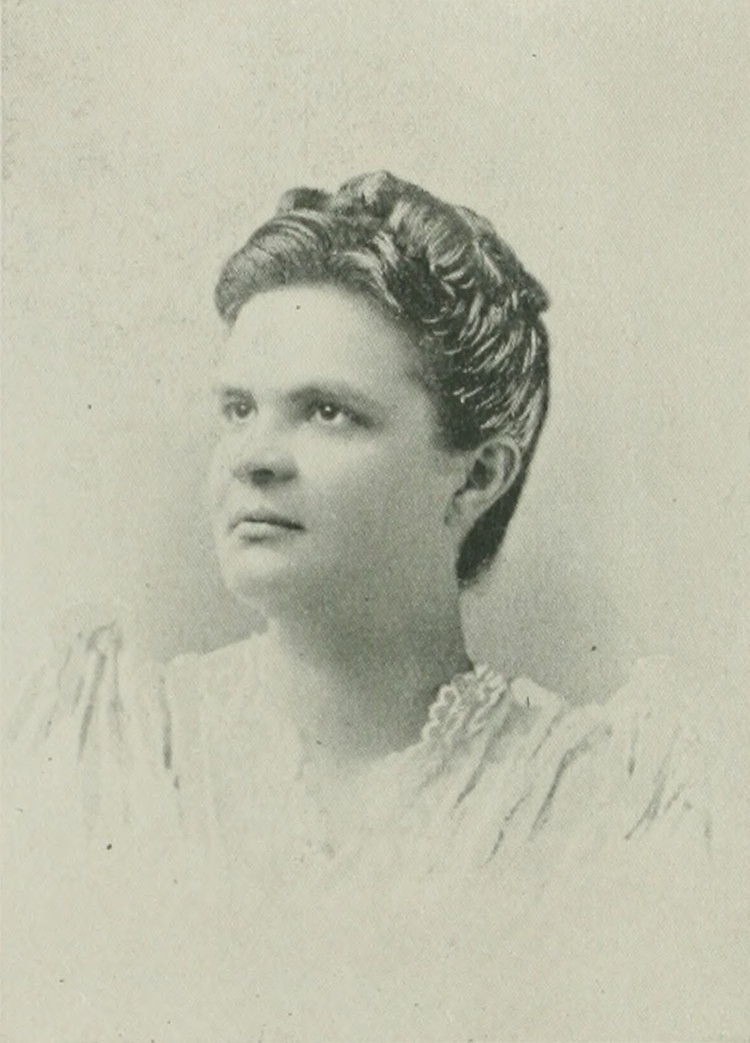
- Portrait from "A Woman of the Century"
- Born: September 6, 1859 (or February 16, 1859); Almond, New York, U.S.
- Died: July 25, 1937, Dover; Dover, New Jersey, U.S.
- Education: Alfred University; College of Physicians and Surgeons (Boston, Massachusetts)
- Occupations: physician; surgeon; medical writer; editor
- Children: Victor Brewster (né Victor Hamilton)
- Relatives: Flora A. Brewster (sister); William Brewster
- Medical career
- Notable works: The Baltimore Family Health Journal; The Homeopathic Advocate and Health Journal

Signature
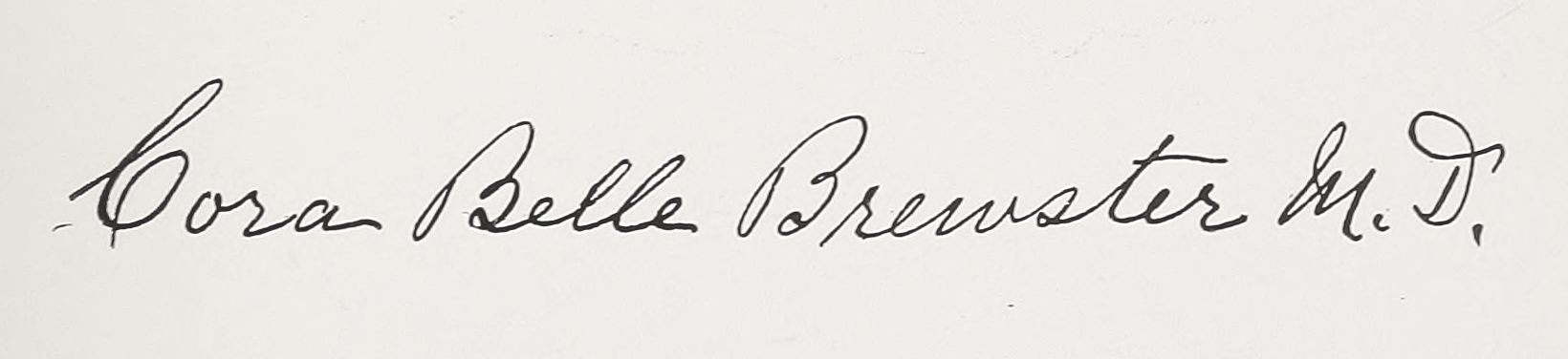

Cora Belle Brewster (1859 – July 25, 1937) was an American physician, surgeon, medical writer, and editor. She worked as a gynecological surgeon and co-founded two medical journals with her sister, Flora Alzora Brewster, M.D.

== Early life and education ==
Coat of arms of William Brewster

Cora Belle Brewster was born in Almond, New York, September 6, 1859. (Note: According to The Salisbury Truth (1898), Brewster was born February 16, 1859.) She was the third daughter of Ephraim J. Brewster (d. 1868) and Mary Burdick Brewster. Mary Brewster was a member of the Seventh Day Baptists.

On the paternal side of her family, Brewster was descended from the Campbells of Scotland, hence a mixture of English and Scotch heritage. She was a lineal descendant of Elder William Brewster, chief of the Pilgrim Fathers. Her lineage was traceable into English history before the landing of the Pilgrim Fathers.

Brewster's siblings included sisters, Alice Delphine Brewster (b. 1861), Fidelia Adeline Brewster (b. 1865), Flora Alzora Brewster, M.D., as well as brothers, Luther Palmer Brewster (b. 1858) and Leonard Thorpe Brewster (b. 1868).

While in preparatory school, Brewster was known by her middle name, "Belle." She was educated partly at Alfred University, where she studied for five years.

== Early career and medical school ==
Brewster left school and worked as a teacher for several years, including at the high school in Smethport, Pennsylvania.

In 1877, Brewster moved to Chicago and took a special course in the Northwestern University. After leaving school, she began working as purchasing agent for a large millinery in Chicago.After three years in Chicago, she fell ill and moved to Baltimore, Maryland. There, her health improved, and she began to study of medicine.

Brewster graduated from the College of Physicians and Surgeons in Boston in May, 1886. During her course of study, she spent eighteen months working in Bellevue Hospital in New York City. She then went to Paris, France and finished her studies.

== Baltimore ==
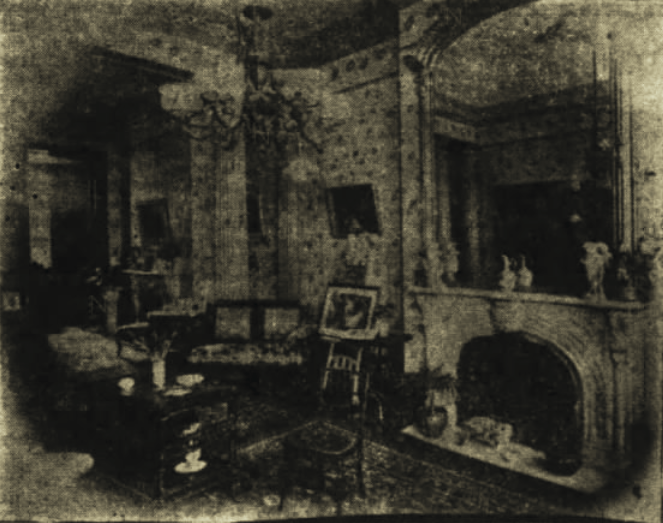
Cora Belle Brewster's Sanatorium

On her return from Europe, in 1886, Brewster moved to Baltimore, and began the practice of her profession in the treatment of female diseases, establishing a sanatorium at 1027 Madison Avenue. It was completely fitted up with all that was required for a fully-equipped institution of this character, and included a corps of trained physicians and nurses. Surgical and electrical treatment was administered as well as medicated baths.

In 1889, in partnership with her sister, Dr. Flora A. Brewster, she began =the publication of The Baltimore Family Health Journal. In 1901, the name of the journal was changed to The Homeopathic Advocate and Health Journal, and made a hospital journal with a corps of ten editors. The partnership between the sister physician was dissolved in 1892.

In 1890, Brewster was elected gynecological surgeon to the Homeopathic Hospital and Free Dispensary of Maryland, under the auspices of the Maryland Homeopathic Medical Society. She was a member of the District of Columbia and Maryland Clinical Societies, of the Maryland State Medical Society, and of the American Institute of Homeopathy.

== Personal life ==
Brewster never married. In July 1898, she adopted an infant, Victor Hamilton, and changed his surname to Brewster. She was a member of the Brown Memorial Presbyterian Church.

Brewster was involved in several personal lawsuits. In 1900, Flora Brewster alleged that her sister, Cora, opened Flora's letters without authority, but did not prosecute. In 1903, Christiana Burrlls sued Cora Brewster in the Superior Court to recover US$5,000 damages for injuries allegedly sustained while engaged in carrying coal from Dr. Brewster's cellar. In 1905, Cora and Flora each had a servant arrested on charge of larceny. In 1906, Cora Brewster was charged with striking a child in her employ and fined US$5.

Cora Belle Brewster died July 25, 1937, at Dover, New Jersey of chronic myocarditis.

== Selected works ==
- Family Health Journal
- Homeopathic Advocate and Health Journal
