= Almond, New York =

- Town
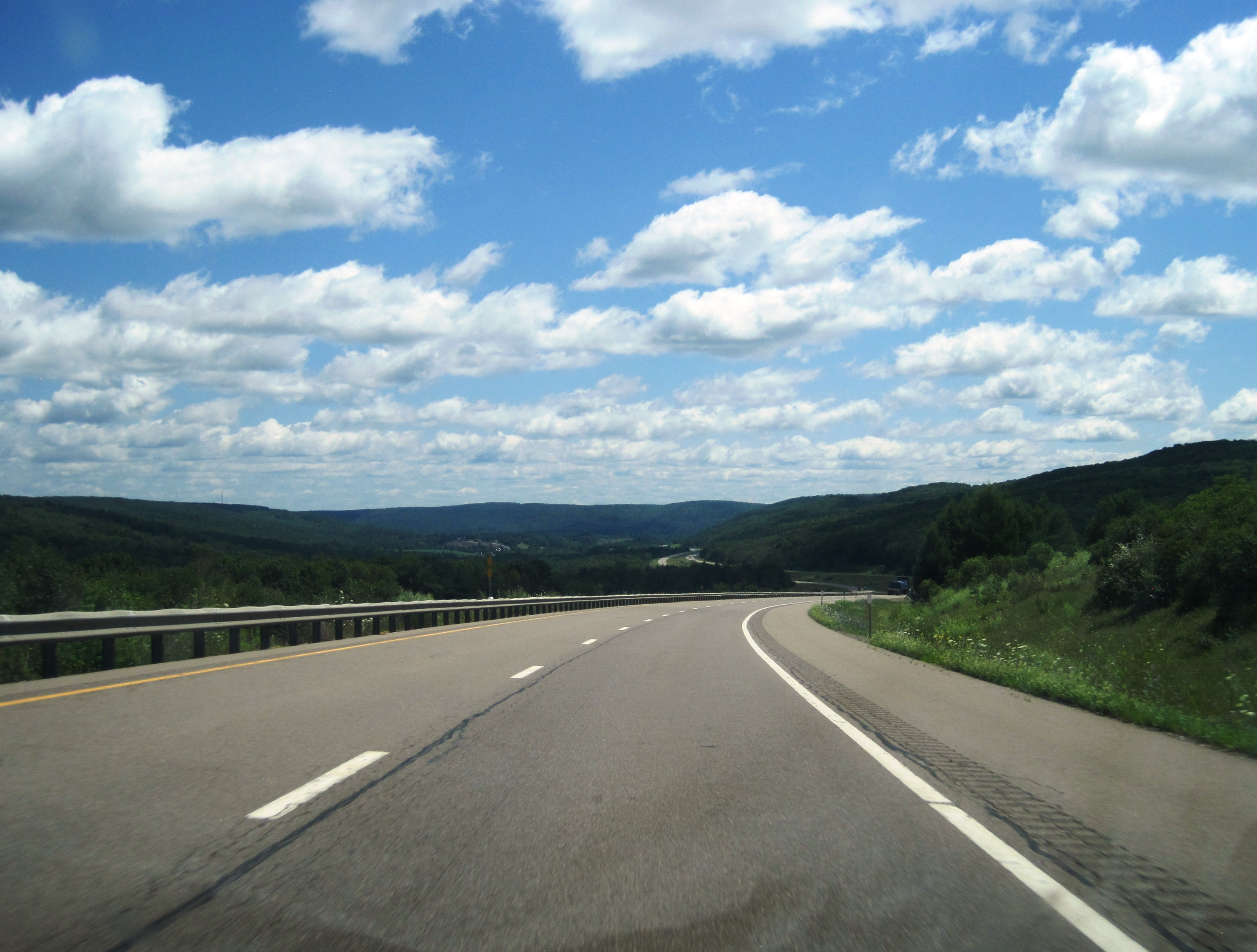
- Eastbound I-86 in Almond

- Location within New York Location within the United States
- Coordinates: 42°19′14″N 77°44′15″W
- Country: United States
- State: New York
- County: Allegany County
- Incorporated: 1821

Area
  - Total: 45.78 sq mi (118.58 km^{2})
  - Land: 45.72 sq mi (118.41 km^{2})
  - Water: 0.066 sq mi (0.17 km^{2})
- Elevation: 2,051 ft (625 m)

Population (2020)
  - Total: 1,526 ▼
  - Estimate (2021): 1,511
  - Density: 34.0/sq mi (13.14/km^{2})
- Time zone: UTC-5 (EST)
  - Summer (DST): UTC-4 (EDT)
- ZIP Codes: 14804 (Almond); 14803 (Alfred Station); 14807 (Arkport); 14843 (Hornell)
- Area code: 607
- FIPS code: 36-003-01451
- Website: www.almondny.org

Almond is a town in Allegany County, New York, United States. The population was 1,526 at the 2020 census.

The Town of Almond is on the eastern edge of the county. The town has a village also called Almond. The town is west of Hornell and is accessible from Interstate 86 at Exit 33 and New York State Route 21.

== History ==
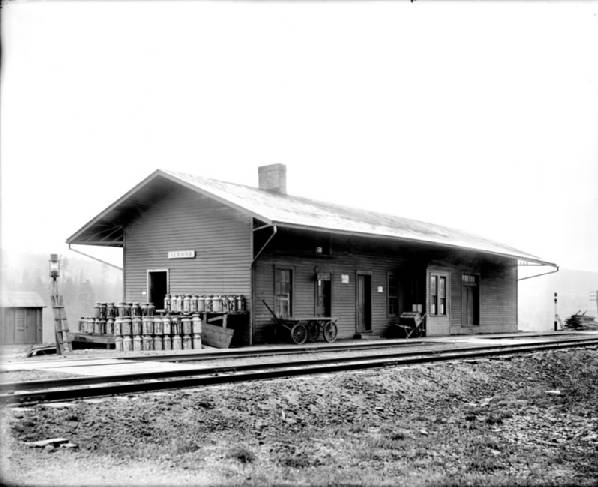
Former Almond Erie Railroad station in 1909

The first part of the town to be settled was near Karrdale in 1796. When Allegany County was established in 1806, the region now in the Town of Almond was part of the Town of Alfred. The Town of Almond was formed in 1821. After Almond was established, parts were removed to form the towns of West Almond and Birdsall.

A history of the area, The Almond Story - The Early Years, was published by John Reynolds, Town Historian, in 1962. (Copies are available from the Almond Historical Society, whose website is at https://almondhistory.wordpress.com/ . See also https://www.facebook.com/AlmondHistoricalSociety/ .) According to Mr. Reynolds, the town is named for a place in Scotland, and not for the nut, which would most likely not have been available here in the wilderness when the town was named. Consequently, the pronunciation is not the same as that of the nut: the word Almond properly begins with the same sound as the nearby towns of Alfred, Alma, Addison, and Angelica.

The Almond Historical Society maintains a museum of local history at the Hagadorn House, a large yellow house on the corner by the town's only traffic light. The House was built in 1830 and features a large open fireplace and stone oven with original cookware, which had been walled in to conserve heat, but was rediscovered by the last couple to occupy the House, Ken and Marie Hagadorn. These Hagadorns had no children, and left their house to the then-recently formed Historical Society in 1971 to serve as a Museum of treasured furniture, clothing, tools, artwork, and much more. The Society maintains genealogical records and news files for families in the town in the adjacent archives building. The archives are open to the public Fridays from 2 - 4 p.m., and the Museum may be visited at that time or by appointment. The Society holds several open houses throughout the year and publishes a quarterly newsletter.

The Almond 20th Century Club Library had its beginning in 1904, when a small group of energetic and forward-thinking women of the community formed a Reading Circle with weekly meetings. Today, the Library offers up-to-date computers, free wifi, and extensive collections of books, audiobooks, and DVDs for all ages, with access to the resources of the Southern Tier Library System, of which it is a member. It has regular story and craft times for children, a book discussion group for adults, an annual mystery theater, and meeting rooms available for use by the public. The Library's historic brick building, constructed in 1912, is in need of major renovation, and various fund-raising activities are being held. Reconstruction is scheduled to begin in the spring of 2020. More information can be found at https://www.facebook.com/almondlibrary or https://almondlibrary.org/ .

== Geography ==
The scenic area consists primarily of long, wooded hills with homes and active or abandoned farmland in the valleys between. According to the United States Census Bureau, the town has a total area of 45.8 square miles (118.7 km^{2}), of which, 45.8 square miles (118.6 km^{2}) of it is land and 0.02% is water.

The east town line is the border of the Town of Hornellsville in Steuben County, New York. The Town of Burns is on the northern boundary, Alfred lies to the south, and West Almond and Birdsall lie to the west.

The Southern Tier Expressway (Interstate 86 and New York State Route 17) and New York State Route 21 pass through the town.

Canacadea Creek, after joining with the confluence of McHenry Valley and Karr Valley Creeks, flows out the eastern town line toward the Canisteo River.

=== Climate ===
Climate data for Almond (Hornell Almond Dam), New York, 1991–2020 normals, extremes 2000–present
Month	Jan	Feb	Mar	Apr	May	Jun	Jul	Aug	Sep	Oct	Nov	Dec	Year
Record high °F (°C)	62 (17)	73 (23)	77 (25)	88 (31)	92 (33)	95 (35)	100 (38)	100 (38)	92 (33)	85 (29)	75 (24)	67 (19)	100 (38)
Mean maximum °F (°C)	54.8 (12.7)	54.1 (12.3)	64.5 (18.1)	78.2 (25.7)	87.5 (30.8)	89.8 (32.1)	91.7 (33.2)	88.8 (31.6)	87.6 (30.9)	77.7 (25.4)	67.1 (19.5)	57.4 (14.1)	92.5 (33.6)
Mean daily maximum °F (°C)	30.0 (−1.1)	32.8 (0.4)	41.4 (5.2)	55.2 (12.9)	68.1 (20.1)	76.3 (24.6)	81.0 (27.2)	78.6 (25.9)	71.3 (21.8)	58.2 (14.6)	45.6 (7.6)	35.3 (1.8)	56.2 (13.4)
Daily mean °F (°C)	21.2 (−6.0)	22.9 (−5.1)	30.9 (−0.6)	42.7 (5.9)	54.7 (12.6)	63.3 (17.4)	67.7 (19.8)	66.1 (18.9)	59.2 (15.1)	47.6 (8.7)	36.7 (2.6)	27.5 (−2.5)	45.0 (7.2)
Mean daily minimum °F (°C)	12.4 (−10.9)	12.9 (−10.6)	20.3 (−6.5)	30.2 (−1.0)	41.3 (5.2)	50.3 (10.2)	54.3 (12.4)	53.5 (11.9)	47.0 (8.3)	37.0 (2.8)	27.8 (−2.3)	19.8 (−6.8)	33.9 (1.1)
Mean minimum °F (°C)	−7.5 (−21.9)	−6.7 (−21.5)	1.8 (−16.8)	18.6 (−7.4)	27.7 (−2.4)	38.5 (3.6)	45.7 (7.6)	44.0 (6.7)	35.6 (2.0)	24.6 (−4.1)	12.9 (−10.6)	5.1 (−14.9)	−11.1 (−23.9)
Record low °F (°C)	−21 (−29)	−22 (−30)	−22 (−30)	5 (−15)	22 (−6)	35 (2)	40 (4)	40 (4)	28 (−2)	19 (−7)	−3 (−19)	−10 (−23)	−22 (−30)
Average precipitation inches (mm)	2.38 (60)	1.89 (48)	2.62 (67)	3.28 (83)	3.37 (86)	4.11 (104)	3.97 (101)	3.86 (98)	3.85 (98)	3.61 (92)	2.74 (70)	2.71 (69)	38.39 (976)
Average snowfall inches (cm)	16.4 (42)	13.9 (35)	11.6 (29)	2.6 (6.6)	0.1 (0.25)	0.0 (0.0)	0.0 (0.0)	0.0 (0.0)	0.0 (0.0)	0.3 (0.76)	3.5 (8.9)	14.0 (36)	62.4 (158.51)
Average extreme snow depth inches (cm)	7.7 (20)	10.0 (25)	8.4 (21)	1.8 (4.6)	0.0 (0.0)	0.0 (0.0)	0.0 (0.0)	0.0 (0.0)	0.0 (0.0)	0.4 (1.0)	2.3 (5.8)	6.9 (18)	12.9 (33)
Average precipitation days (≥ 0.01 in)	17.8	13.5	14.6	14.7	14.5	13.3	12.4	11.8	12.9	15.3	14.4	16.7	171.9
Average snowy days (≥ 0.1 in)	9.3	8.0	5.3	1.3	0.1	0.0	0.0	0.0	0.0	0.2	2.8	7.3	34.3
Source 1: NOAA
Source 2: National Weather Service (mean maxima/minima, snow depth 2006–2020)

== Demographics ==
Historical population
Census	Pop.	Note	%±
1830	1,804		—
1840	1,434		−20.5%
1850	1,914		33.5%
1860	1,739		−9.1%
1870	1,686		−3.0%
1880	1,567		−7.1%
1890	1,419		−9.4%
1900	1,436		1.2%
1910	1,297		−9.7%
1920	1,121		−13.6%
1930	1,101		−1.8%
1940	1,234		12.1%
1950	1,331		7.9%
1960	1,373		3.2%
1970	1,524		11.0%
1980	1,671		9.6%
1990	1,640		−1.9%
2000	1,604		−2.2%
2010	1,633		1.8%
2020	1,526		−6.6%
2021 (est.)	1,511	▼	−1.0%
U.S. Decennial Census

As of the census of 2000, there were 1,604 people, 632 households, and 439 families residing in the town. The population density was 35.0 inhabitants per square mile (13.5/km^{2}). There were 789 housing units at an average density of 17.2 per square mile (6.6/km^{2}). The racial makeup of the town was 96.95% White, 0.06% Black or African American, 2.12% Asian, 0.56% from other races, and 0.31% from two or more races. Hispanic or Latino of any race were 0.50% of the population.

There were 632 households, out of which 32.6% had children under the age of 18 living with them, 56.6% were married couples living together, 8.4% had a female householder with no husband present, and 30.5% were non-families. 25.2% of all households were made up of individuals, and 8.9% had someone living alone who was 65 years of age or older. The average household size was 2.54 and the average family size was 3.05.

In the town, the population was spread out, with 26.4% under the age of 18, 8.4% from 18 to 24, 26.0% from 25 to 44, 27.3% from 45 to 64, and 11.8% who were 65 years of age or older. The median age was 39 years. For every 100 females, there were 99.5 males. For every 100 females age 18 and over, there were 99.3 males.

The median income for a household in the town was $38,472, and the median income for a family was $48,839. Males had a median income of $32,026 versus $25,000 for females. The per capita income for the town was $18,805. About 6.1% of families and 11.0% of the population were below the poverty line, including 13.8% of those under age 18 and 8.9% of those age 65 or over.

The local public school, Alfred-Almond Central School, is consistently one of the highest-ranked schools in western NY. See Alfred-Almond Junior-Senior High School. There is also an active and supportive homeschool community in the area.

== Communities and locations in the town ==
- Almond – The Village of Almond is at the eastern edge of the town and is partly in Steuben County.
- Bishopville – A hamlet on County Route 32 (Bishopville Road) near the eastern town line.
- Canacadea Creek – A stream in the eastern part of the town.
- Karrdale – A hamlet near the western town line on County Route 2(Karr Valley Road).
- Karr Valley Creek – A stream that parallels the Southern Tier Expressway.
- McHenry Valley - A valley extending southwest from the Village along County Road 11(McHenry Valley Road) toward Five Corners in the Town of Alfred.
- North Almond – A hamlet near the north town line.
- Sand Hill – A location west of Almond village.
- Turnpike Road - part of the original Turnpike Road that extended from Bath, NY westward in the early 19th century (now essentially a one-lane road through State Forests).

== Notable people ==
- Cora Belle Brewster (1859–?), physician, surgeon, medical writer, editor
- Mandana Coleman Thorp (1843–1916), American Civil War nurse, singer, patriot; public official
