= Flora A. Brewster =

American physician and journalist

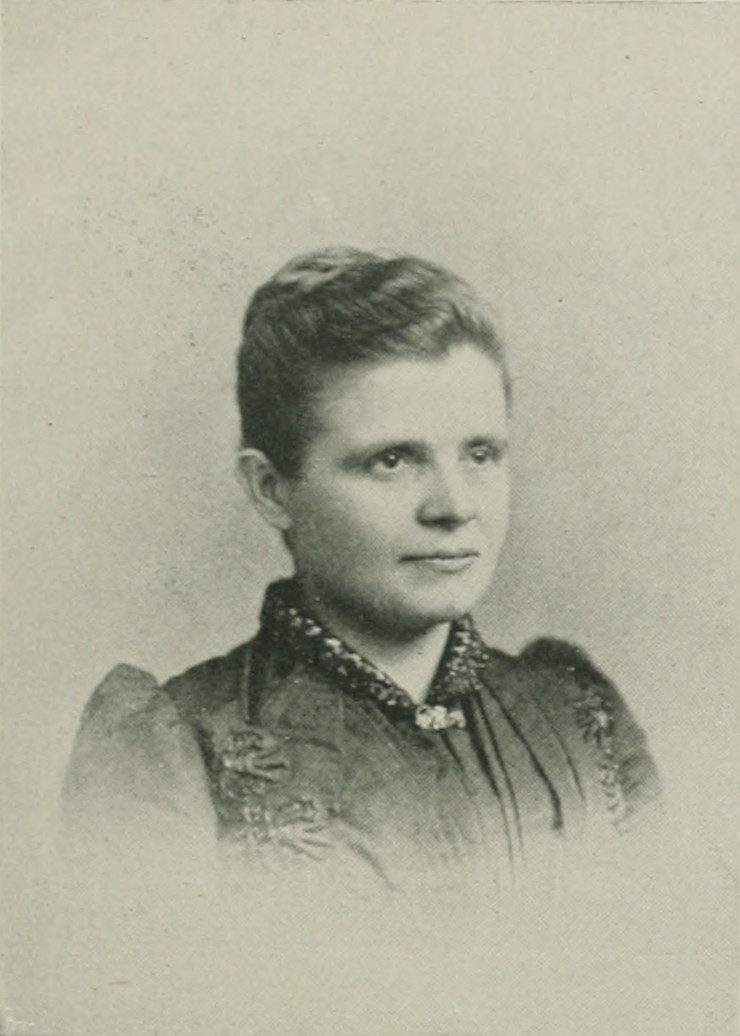
- Portrait in "A Woman of the Century"
- Born: Flora Alzora Brewster; February 26, 1852; Alfred, New York, U.S.
- Died: February 1919 (aged 66–67); Seattle, Washington, U.S.
- Education: Alfred University; Chicago Homeopathic Medical College
- Occupations: physician, surgeon, journalist, medical editor, inventor
- Relatives: Cora Belle Brewster (sister); William Brewster

Signature
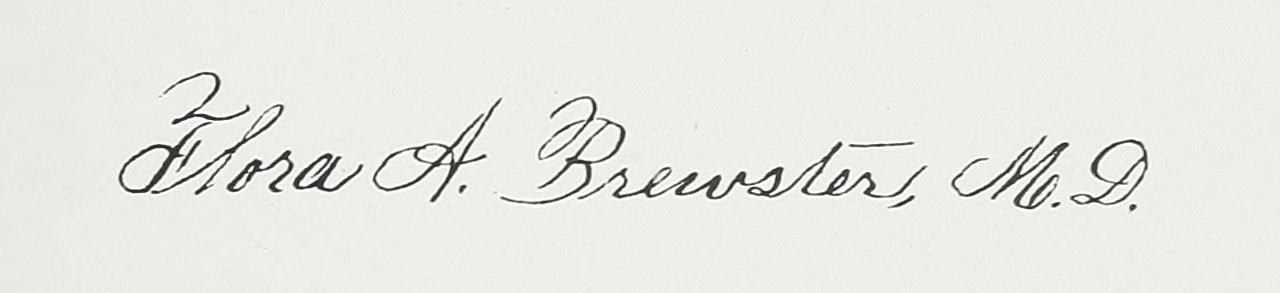

Flora Alzora Brewster (February 26, 1852 – February 1919) was an American physician, surgeon, journalist, medical editor, and inventor. She is remembered as Baltimore, Maryland's first woman surgeon.

In Baltimore, Brewster was a physician in charge of an institution caring for prostitutes and of a women's house of refuge. Later, she was the proprietor and surgeon in charge of a sanitarium. She was an ardent advocate of the higher medical education of women.

== Early life and education ==
Coat of arms of William Brewster

Flora Alzora Brewster was born in Alfred, New York, February 26, 1852. Her family moved to northern Pennsylvania in 1863.

Brewster's parents were Ephraim J. Brewster (d. 1868) and Mary Burdick Brewster. Mary Brewster was a Seventh Day Baptists. On the paternal side of her family, she is descended from the Campbells of Scotland, hence a mixture of English and Scotch heritage. She was a lineal descendant of Elder William Brewster, of the pilgrims, who came to the America on the Mayflower.

Her siblings included sisters, Alice Delphine Brewster (b. 1861), Fidelia Adeline Brewster (b. 1865), and Cora Belle Brewster, M.D. (b. 1859), as well as brothers, Luther Palmer Brewster (b. 1858) and Leonard Thorpe Brewster (b. 1868).

In 1866, Brewster enrolled in Alfred University, where she studied science. In 1868, her father died suddenly, and she was obliged to leave the university to attend to the finances of her family.

== Early career and further education ==
Early in her career, Brewster worked as a copyist in a tax collector's office, but soon left to begin working as a teacher. She intended to complete her university degree, but ill health led her to withdraw from school to focus solely on her teaching career. In 1872, she was appointed teacher in the Mansfield Orphan School, in Mansfield, Pennsylvania which was then the training-school for the Mansfield State Normal School.

In 1875, Brewster earned a Bachelor of Education in Mansfield, and in 1877, she earned a Master's degree in Elementary Didactics, while still teaching. In 1877, she teaching due to ill health. She spent a year traveling in the American west and Northwest, and her health was so greatly improved that in 1878, she went to Chicago and took the editorial and business management of the Newsboys' Appeal, an illustrated journal published in the interest of the Newsboys' Home in that city. The following year, she began to study medicine with Dr. Julia Holmes Smith, and conducted a night school on the kindergarten plan in the Newsboys' Home. In 1882, she completed the course in the Chicago Homeopathic Medical College, after which she went to Baltimore, Maryland, where she spent six months in the office and private hospital of the gynecological surgeon August F. Erich.

== Maryland ==
Brewster opened an office and began to practice in Baltimore in 1882. At that time, only one woman had succeeded in establishing a paying practice in Baltimore, and that one was Dr. Emma Stein Wanstall, who died in September 1882. No female physician in the city had been entrusted with surgical cases. Over the next four years, Brewster acquired a large practice and performed charitable work.

In 1883, Brewster was physician and surgeon to the Home for Fallen Women, a charitable institution situated in Baltimore for prostitutes and Unwed mothers. She was also physician to the Female House of Refuge, a reformatory institution for incorrigible girls. She was also given clinics in the Homeopathic Hospital in Baltimore.

In 1884, Brewster provided a testimonial for Duffy Barley Malt Whiskey in The Baltimore Sun, writing, "I seldom prescribe alcoholic stimulants, but when I do I always order your Pure Barley Malt Whisky, because I am convinced that it is not only free from fusel oil, but not in any way adulterated." It held all the more weight as Brewster was a strong advocate of temperance.

Brewster formed a partnership with her sister, Dr. Cora Belle Brewster, in 1888. In 1890, the agitation caused by the application for the admission of women to the medical department of Johns Hopkins University enlightened people in the American south in regard to the status of women in the medical profession. Both the sisters were elected surgeons, and they gave clinics in the new homeopathic hospital in Baltimore. Besides their general practice, the doctors Brewster had a large practice in gynecological surgery, extending over the entire South. They are credited with opening the medical field to the women of the South.

In 1889, the sisters began the publication of The Baltimore Family Health Journal. In 1891, the name of the journal was changed to The Homeopathic Advocate and Health Journal, and was made a hospital journal with ten editors. In 1892, the partnership between Flora and Cora Brewster was dissolved.

In September, 1892, Brewster spent some time with Professor Pratt, of Chicago, studying the principles of orificial surgery, and at once made use of them in her surgical practice in gynecological surgery. She met with success as a skillful and rapid operator, and never lost a surgical case. She invented several instruments for the more convenient and effective use of electricity in gynecological practice, and also an electric belt.

In April, 1893, Brewster purchased a large dwelling with grounds attached, situated at 1221 Madison Avenue, Baltimore, where she opened a sanatorium for the treatment of the medical and surgical diseases of women. She had an assistant, Dr. Donna Anna Waldron, who formerly practiced medicine in Hot Springs, Arkansas. The buildings were well suited for the purpose—heated by steam and fitted with electric, medicated, and vapor baths, and all forms of electrical appliances used in medical practice, apparatus for the Swedish movement cure, and also a training school for nurses. In a short time since the sanatorium was opened, it had proved to be successful. Due to failing health, Brewster discontinued the sanitarium in 1906.

Another one of Brewster's testimonials was published by The Baltimore Sun in 1896, this time regarding the benefits of riding a bicycle. It said in part: "I have been riding a wheel for more than a year and find myself greatly benefited by it. I am confined so much by my professional duties that its use is a means of salvation. Most of the women who come under my care are suffering from lack of exercise. Their troubles are all the result of muscular debility, and it has been my experience that the majority of them are wonderfully benefited and relieved by bicycle riding."

Brewster looked to leave her Baltimore practice in 1902 and move west a few miles to start a new practice in Ellicott City, Maryland. The Maryland Hotel Sanatorium Company expected to begin work on a new first-class hotel and sanatorium in Howard County, Maryland in the spring of that year. The building plan was by Brewster who had made a study of the various noted sanatorium in the U.S. and in Europe. The company officers were Lennox Birckhead (president), Henry D. Rullman (vice-president), Brewster (secretary and treatsure), and the attorneys, James P. Gorter and Ernest M. Gibbons.

The Helpful Thought Publishing Company was incorporated in April 1903 by Brewster, Alice D. Brewster (Flora's sister), George J. Weiss, Belle S. Weiss, and Geneva S. Conradt. Brewster's book, Mother's Manual, was published by the Helpful Thought later that year.

In December 1905, it was announced that Brewster had moved her equipment from her Baltimore sanatorium to the Brewster Park Sanatorium in Laurel, Maryland, located at "The Keeley", which featured 52 rooms heated with hot water and lit with electricity. This sanatorium, Brewster being the medical director, was advertised as having the most modern appliances for the treatment of rheumatism, gout, neurasthenia, and other chronic diseases. The enterprise failed in less than a year and Brewster filed bankruptcy in May 1906.

== Pacific Northwest ==
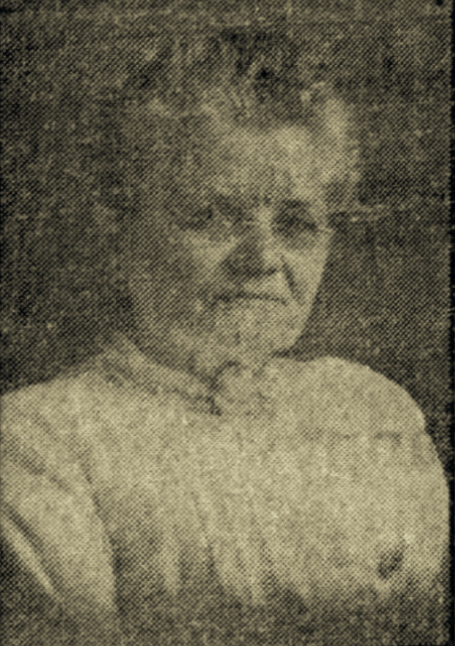
Flora A. Brewster (1916)

Brewster arrived in Salem, Oregon in 1914 and began advertising in November of that year for her chiropractic practice, "limited to spinal adjustment". In July 1916, she was charged with practicing chiropractic profession without a license, but was pronounced not guilty by the jury after a few minutes' deliberation.

In December 1915, Brewster filed articles of incorporation to establish a school of neurology in Salem. Located in Salem's Hubbard building, it was named the Oregon School of Neurology. In addition to Brewster, the company stockholders included her brother, Luther, as well as Dr. Harry Bancroft, A.L. Seamster, and Benjamin S. Via. The faculty included Prof. Florian Von Escnehn of Willamette University and Dr. Alice Bancroft. The school was founded on the principle that the center of wasted nerve energy was from the eye, which principle Brewster stated that she had established. The instruction would be along new lines of drugless healing developed by Brewster after a test of all other methods of drugless healing.

She died in February 1919, burned to death as a result of an explosion of an oil stove at her home in Seattle, Washington.

== Affiliations ==
Brewster was a member of several societies: Maryland State Medical Society, Maryland and District of Columbia Clinical Society, American Institute of Homeopathy, American Health Resort Association, Chairman of the Bureau of Gynæcology in the National Society of Electro-therapeutists, and also a member of the American Association of Ori-facial Surgeons.

== Selected works ==
- Mother's Manual (1903)
