= Eva Allen Alberti =

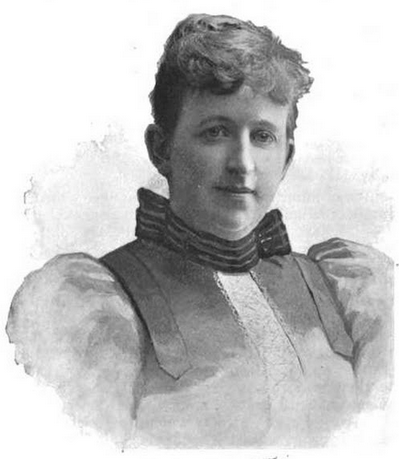
- Born: Evangel Eva Allen; April 4, 1856; Alfred, New York, U.S.
- Died: March 6, 1938 (aged 81); New York City
- Education: Alfred University
- Occupation: dramatics teacher
- Employer: Teachers College, Columbia University
- Organizations: New York College of Expression; Young People's Theater, Carnegie Hall
- Spouse: William Maxson Alberti (m. 1879)
- Relatives: Alfred Allen (brother)

Eva Allen Alberti (April 4, 1856 – March 6, 1938) was an American dramatics teacher who specialized in the American meaning of pantomime i.e. mime. Her students were actors, teachers, directors and producers including, Prof. Gertrude Colby, Jane Cowl, Cecil B. DeMille, William C. deMille, Ann Harding, Fredric March, Douglas MacLean, Guthrie McClintic, William Powell, Edward G. Robinson, Anita Stewart, Stuart Walker, and Chester M. Wallace.

== Early life and education ==
Evangel Eva Allen was born in Alfred, New York, April 4, 1856. Her father was Jonathan Macomber Allen (1823-1892), president of Alfred University. Abigail Ann (Maxson) Allen (1824-1894). Her siblings were William (b. 1853), May (b. 1860), and Alfred (b. 1866).

She was educated at Alfred University (A. B., 1877; A. M., 1879).

== Career ==
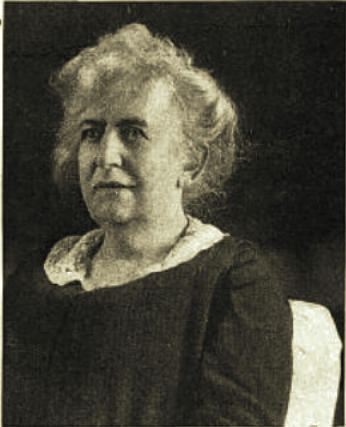
(1923)

For thirteen years, Alberti was a lecturer at Teachers College, Columbia University. She was the president of the New York College of Expression, and the director of the Young People's Theater in Carnegie Hall, New York City. The greatest novelty of the plans for the Young People's Theater carried out by Alberti was the presentation of complete grand opera in mime with appropriate instrumental music. The Alberti Pantomimes, it was claimed, used a more universal code of gesticulation than the French, Italian, or German. American pantomime, such as that developed under the hand of Alberti, became a finer art than that represented by the garish musical Christmas pantomimes of Britain, the distinction includes less cross-dressing, risque jokes and greater individual quality, in daintiness of movement, and delicacy of facial expression. She made a speciality of Greek sacred dances.

== Personal life ==
In 1879, she married Prof. William Maxson Alberti, the son of Thomas Shipley Alberti, who became clerk of the Seventh Day Baptist Church.

Eva Allen Alberti died in New York City, March 6, 1938, at the age of 82.

== Selected works ==
=== Books ===
- A handbook of acting (1932)

=== Dramatic compositions ===
- A Midsummer night's dream (1925)
