= West Almond Churches =

Historic churches in New York, United States

- U.S. National Register of Historic Places
- Location within New York Location within the United States
- Location: Cty. Rte. 2, West Almond, New York
- Coordinates: 42°17′59″N 77°53′7″W
- Area: 2 acres (0.81 ha)
- Built: 1861
- Architectural style: Greek Revival
- NRHP reference No.: 00000876
- Added to NRHP: August 2, 2000

West Almond Churches is a set of two historic church buildings in West Almond, Allegany County, New York. They are now known as: West Almond Community Center (formerly West Almond Baptist Church) and West Almond Town Hall (formerly West Almond Methodist Episcopal Church). Both structures were built in 1861 in the Greek Revival style.

It was listed on the National Register of Historic Places in 2000.
