= Allen, New York =

- Town
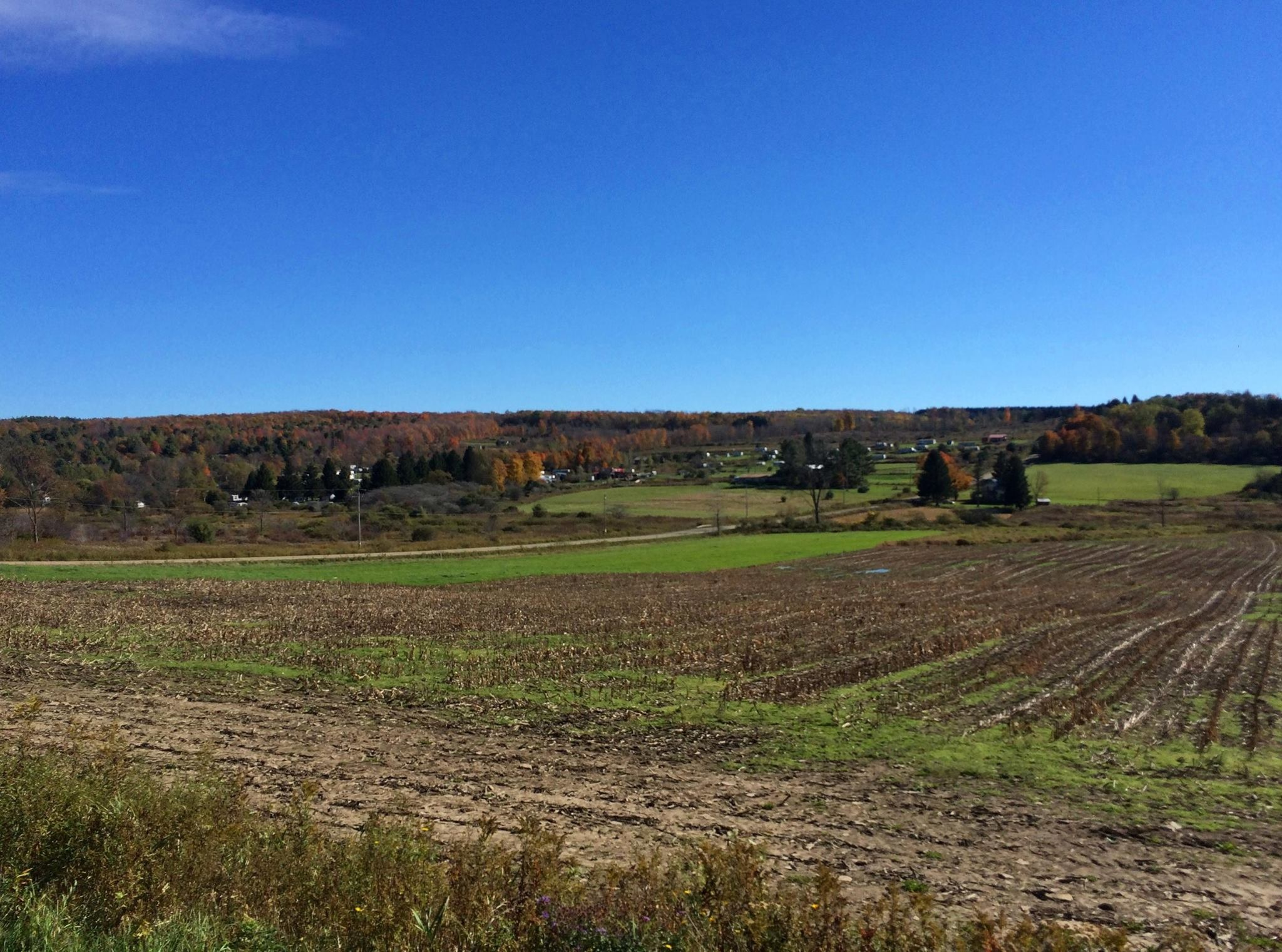

- Seal

- Location within New York Location within the United States
- Coordinates: 42°23′09″N 78°00′55″W
- Country: United States
- State: New York
- County: Allegany County
- Incorporated: 1823

Government
  - Town supervisor: Zachary Badgley Town council: Todd Krzeminski; Jeff Steadman; Rick Hunt

Area
  - Total: 36.58 sq mi (94.74 km^{2})
  - Land: 36.38 sq mi (94.22 km^{2})
  - Water: 0.20 sq mi (0.53 km^{2})
- Elevation: 2,021 ft (616 m)

Population (2020)
  - Total: 493 ▲
  - Estimate (2021): 488
  - Density: 12.1/sq mi (4.69/km^{2})
- Time zone: UTC-5 (EST)
  - Summer (DST): UTC-4 (EDT)
- ZIP Codes: 14709 (Angelica); 14711 (Belfast); 14735 (Fillmore)
- Area code: 585
- FIPS code: 36-003-01319
- Website: Town website

Allen is a town in Allegany County, New York, United States. The population was 493 at the 2020 census. The town is named after Ethan Allen.

The Town of Allen is in the north-central part of Allegany County.

== History ==
The Town of Allen was founded in 1823, formed from part of the Town of Angelica. In 1829 more territory was added from the Town of Birdsall.

== Geography ==
According to the United States Census Bureau, the town has a total area of 36.6 square miles (95 km^{2}), of which 36.4 square miles (94 km^{2}) is land and 0.2 square miles (0.52 km^{2}) (0.60%) is water.

== Demographics ==
Historical population
Census	Pop.	Note	%±
1830	898		—
1840	867		−3.5%
1850	955		10.1%
1860	991		3.8%
1870	794		−19.9%
1880	818		3.0%
1890	717		−12.3%
1900	655		−8.6%
1910	598		−8.7%
1920	524		−12.4%
1930	419		−20.0%
1940	416		−0.7%
1950	347		−16.6%
1960	306		−11.8%
1970	292		−4.6%
1980	486		66.4%
1990	406		−16.5%
2000	462		13.8%
2010	448		−3.0%
2020	493		10.0%
2021 (est.)	488		−1.0%
U.S. Decennial Census

As of the census of 2000, there were 462 people, 178 households, and 132 families residing in the town. The population density was 12.7 inhabitants per square mile (4.9/km^{2}). There were 411 housing units at an average density of 11.3 per square mile (4.4/km^{2}). The racial makeup of the town was 98.92% White, 0.43% Native American, and 0.65% from two or more races. Hispanic or Latino people of any race were 0.22% of the population.

There were 178 households, out of which 30.9% had children under the age of 18 living with them, 62.9% were married couples living together, 4.5% had a female householder with no husband present, and 25.8% were non-families. 22.5% of all households were made up of individuals, and 6.7% had someone living alone who was 65 years of age or older. The average household size was 2.60 and the average family size was 3.01.

In the town, the population was spread out, with 25.1% under the age of 18, 6.9% from 18 to 24, 29.4% from 25 to 44, 25.5% from 45 to 64, and 13.0% who were 65 years of age or older. The median age was 39 years. For every 100 females, there were 123.2 males. For every 100 females age 18 and over, there were 123.2 males.

The median income for a household in the town was $27,386, and the median income for a family was $29,688. Males had a median income of $26,528 versus $21,563 for females. The per capita income for the town was $13,830. About 16.4% of families and 18.7% of the population were below the poverty line, including 19.2% of those under age 18 and 14.3% of those age 65 or over.

== Communities and locations in Allen ==
- Allen Center – a hamlet on County Route 15 (Basswood Hill Road), centrally located in the town
- Aristotle – a hamlet near the south town line on County Route 15 (Basswood Hill Road)
- Polish Mountain – near Allen Lake
- State Road – near the eastern town line
- West Allen – southwest of Allen Center
- Wigwam Creek – a stream flowing through the west part of the town
