= Albion, Oswego County, New York =

Albion
- Town
- Location in Oswego County and the state of New York.

- Location of New York in the United States
- Coordinates: 43°28′10″N 76°02′59″W
- Country: United States
- State: New York
- County: Oswego County
- Incorporated: 1825

Government
  - Supervisor: Mike Faulkner

Area
  - Total: 47.82 sq mi (123.85 km^{2})
  - Land: 47.29 sq mi (122.47 km^{2})
  - Water: 0.53 sq mi (1.38 km^{2})
- Elevation: 561 ft (171 m)

Population (2020)
  - Total: 2,009
  - Density: 46.2/sq mi (17.84/km^{2})
- Time zone: UTC-5 (EST)
  - Summer (DST): UTC-4 (EDT)
- ZIP code: 13302
- Area code: 315
- FIPS code: 36-075-01055
- Website: http://www.townofalbion-ny.us/

Albion is a town in the northeastern part of Oswego County, New York, United States. The population was 2,009 at the 2020 census.

== History ==
Prior to 1788, Native Americans would come to the area to hunt and fish for salmon during the spawning season. They called it Alkineaur, meaning "sand bank." The territory was annexed to the state of New York on March 1, 1788.

Then, in 1791, two brothers, John and Nicholas Roosevelt bought a tract of land from the state, part of which would later become the town of Albion. They sold the land to George Scriba, a Dutchman, on April 7, 1792. In December 1794, Scriba received a patent from the state. The land was now referred to as "Scriba's Patent."

In January, the subdivision of the land started. On March 24, 1804, the Town of Williamstown was formed from Oneida County. On February 20, 1807, the Town of Richland was formed from Oneida County. Part of this would later become the Town of Albion.

In 1812, the first settler arrived. A fur trader by the name of Cary Burdick bought a parcel of land on the Williamstown road, about two miles (3 km) south of present-day Altmar. In 1813, the Lilly brothers, David, Luther and Benjamin, settled near Burdick, and built the first sawmill. This is where Luther Lilly's first son was born.

The first settler of the present-day village of Altmar arrived. Peter Henderson, from Scotland, bought 200 acres (0.81 km^{2}) of land bordering the Salmon River, and began clearing it for farmland. In 1814, Dr. Brace, a physician, opened a tavern in the village of Sand Bank. In 1816, the first schoolhouse in the town was built, with Sylvia Breed as the first teacher. In 1819, the first marriage, between H.B. Baker of Albany and Lucy Burdick (Cary Burdick's daughter), took place. Moses Rich arrived in Sand Bank in 1822, and built the first Grist Mill. On March 24, 1825, the Town of Albion was set apart from the Town of Richland. On the original survey map of Scriba's Patent, this was known as Township 22. George Scriba called it Alkmaar after a town in his home country of Holland. The first town meeting was held in Albion on May 3 that same year. Local officials were chosen for various offices. In 1828, a native of Oneida county, Ammi Hinckley, arrived in Sand Bank and opened a general store. Another tavern, kept by William Abbott, was in business around the same time.

On January 27, 1829, the First Presbyterian Church was established. Services were held in the schoolhouse. This later became the First Congregational Church. The Union Church was established on January 8, 1834, in Sand Bank. It was shared by Presbyterians and Methodists. Also in 1837, the Albion Baptist Church was organized. The Pineville Methodist-Episcopal Church was built. The foundation was made with stones picked from the shores of Lake Ontario, and transported to Salmon River (now called Pineville) by wagon. In 1856, the Dugway Union Church was organized and a building was erected. The village of Sand Bank was incorporated on February 21, 1876. On October 13, 1885, the village was almost completely destroyed by fire. All that remained of the business district was the Congregational Church and the Episcopal Church, which was under construction. On February 17, 1895, the Methodist congregation constructed a new church. About a month later, on March 18, 1895, Sand Bank was changed to Altmar.

During the summer of 1837, Albion's first post office was established. William Abbott became the first Postmaster, and William Worden became the first mail carrier. He delivered mail between Oswego, Utica and Albion. A building was erected in 1852 at Albion Center (on a corner of Tinker Tavern Road and County Route 22). This later became known as Grange Hall, and still stands today, although not in use. In the 1840s to 1850s, there was an influx of settlers to Albion that caused a demand for lumber which became the predominant industry because of the new construction. In 1850, a "plank road" was constructed between Albion and Constantia, which is now Route 13. Two toll gates at the village limits of Sand Bank were constructed.

In 1851, the construction through Albion of the R. W. & O. Railroad (Rome, Watertown & Oswego Railroad) began. The station at Sand Bank was completed in May. In 1852, the Chapman brothers, James, Irving and George, built the first of many tanneries in the township. Many Irish immigrants, escaping from the Great Famine in the 1840s, found work here. On March 21, 1853, the Sand Bank Cemetery Association was established. In the 1860s, 350 men from Albion enlisted in the Union Army and Navy. Fifty-six of these men lost their lives, and many more were permanently injured.

On June 14, 1911, the Civil War Monument was unveiled in the Riverside Cemetery in Altmar. In 1918, twenty-two men from Albion served in World War I. On June 15, that same year, Delbert Russel was killed in action. On April 24, 1936, a brick school was built in Altmar, with Elston Ecker as the first principal. It is now called the Altmar Elementary School, and will be closed in 2012 due to lack of students enrolling. In the 1940s, twenty men from Albion served in World War II. On October 4, 1944, Edgar Tryon was killed in action. He is interred in Edinburgh, Netherlands. On April 28, 1959, the Altmar-Parish-Williamstown School District built a new high school in Parish. It opened in the fall of 1960. The first graduating class, in 1961, included Nancy Virginia Hess and her sister Dorothy Ann Hess. Dorothy Hess died in 1963 of hepatitis. Her grave can be found in the Riverside Cemetery in Altmar. In 1979, the Salmon River Fish Hatchery began construction in Altmar. Also, Charles William August Hess, a resident of Altmar, died of cancer. He was buried next to his daughter, Dorothy, in an unmarked grave. In 1989, the Altmar-Parish-Williamstown School District built a new middle school, across the road from the high school.

== Geography ==
According to the United States Census Bureau, the town has a total area of 47.8 square miles (124 km^{2}), of which 47.2 square miles (122 km^{2}) is land and 0.6 square miles (1.6 km^{2}) (1.17%) is water.

== Demographics ==
Historical population
Census	Pop.	Note	%±
2020	2,009		—
U.S. Decennial Census

As of the census of 2000, there were 2,083 people, 704 households, and 539 families residing in the town. The population density was 44.1 inhabitants per square mile (17.0/km^{2}). There were 797 housing units at an average density of 16.9 per square mile (6.5/km^{2}). The racial makeup of the town was 98.42% White, 0.05% African American, 0.34% Native American, 0.14% Asian, 0.10% from other races, and 0.96% from two or more races. Hispanic or Latino of any race were 0.62% of the population.

There were 704 households, out of which 38.4% had children under the age of 18 living with them, 61.4% were married couples living together, 8.9% had a female householder with no husband present, and 23.3% were non-families. 16.3% of all households were made up of individuals, and 6.4% had someone living alone who was 65 years of age or older. The average household size was 2.95 and the average family size was 3.25.

The town population had increased with 31.2% under the age of 18, 8.8% from 18 to 24, 28.5% from 25 to 44, 22.7% from 45 to 64, and 8.8% who were 65 years of age or older. The median age was 33 years. For every 100 females, there were 97.4 males. For every 100 females age 18 and over, there were 99.4 males.

The median income for a household in town was $38,083, and the median income for a family was $40,000. Males had a median income of $32,667 versus $21,875 for females. The per capita income for the town was $16,022. About 10.4% of families and 13.5% of the population were below the poverty line, including 16.3% of those under age 18 and 9.9% of those age 65 or over.

== Communities and locations in Albion ==
- Albion Center – A hamlet southwest of Altmar.
- Altmar – A hamlet on State Route 13 and the Salmon River.
- Barber Corners – A location north of Albion Center.
- Centerville – A hamlet in the northwestern corner of the town, north of Pineville.
- Dugway – A hamlet on State Route 104 west of Howardville.
- Howardville – A hamlet on State Route 104 in the southern part of the town and south of Albion Center.
- Maple Corners – A location at the western town line.
- Mosher Corners – A hamlet in the southern part of the town.
- Pineville – A hamlet on the Salmon River, northwest of Altmar on State Route 13.
