= Altmar, New York =

Hamlet in the state of New York, United States

- Hamlet and CDP
- Location within the state of New York Altmar, New York (the United States)
- Coordinates: 43°30′43″N 76°0′3″W
- Country: United States
- State: New York
- County: Oswego
- Town: Albion
- Settled: 1813
- Incorporated: February 21, 1876
- Dissolved: May 31, 2013

Area
  - Total: 2.08 sq mi (5.39 km^{2})
  - Land: 2.07 sq mi (5.36 km^{2})
  - Water: 0.012 sq mi (0.03 km^{2})
- Elevation: 574 ft (175 m)

Population (2020)
  - Total: 357
  - Density: 172.5/sq mi (66.61/km^{2})
- Time zone: UTC-5 (Eastern (EST))
  - Summer (DST): UTC-4 (EDT)
- ZIP code: 13302
- Area code: 315
- FIPS code: 36-01550
- GNIS feature ID: 2391512

Altmar is a hamlet (and census-designated place) in Oswego County, New York, United States. The population was 407 at the 2010 census.

The former Village of Altmar (formerly "Sand Bank" and now dissolved) is in northern part of the Town of Albion at State Route 13 and County Route 22. Altmar is the seat of the town government.

== History ==
The community was first settled in 1813 by Peter Henderson. The village was incorporated in 1876 as "Sand Bank." In 1890, the population was 551.

On November 10, 2010, residents of Altmar voted to dissolve their village's government under Governor Andrew Cuomo's Government Reorganization and Citizen Empowerment Act, becoming the first village to do so under the act; the margin was a mere six votes. The village board had until May 31, 2011 to draft a plan to dissolve the village's government.

The village was dissolved on June 1, 2013 and remains an area within the Town of Albion.

== Attractions ==
Located within Altmar is the Salmon River Fish Hatchery, operated by the New York State Department of Environmental Conservation to support the state's stocking program for Lake Ontario and Lake Erie. The hatchery is a popular destination for visitors, many of whom come to watch egg collections from steelhead, coho salmon and Chinook salmon returning to the hatchery. Over three million young fish are raised at the hatchery each year.

== Notable persons ==
Artist Milton Avery was born in what was then Sand Bank in 1885.

== Geography ==
Altmar is located at 43°30′43″N 76°0′3″W (43.511877, −76.000756).

According to the United States Census Bureau, the village has a total area of 2.2 square miles (5.7 km^{2}), of which 2.2 square miles (5.7 km^{2}) is land and 0.46% is water.

== Demographics ==
Historical population
Census	Pop.	Note	%±
1880	753		—
1890	551		−26.8%
1900	416		−24.5%
1910	363		−12.7%
1920	315		−13.2%
1930	378		20.0%
1940	304		−19.6%
1950	299		−1.6%
1960	277		−7.4%
1970	448		61.7%
1980	347		−22.5%
1990	336		−3.2%
2000	351		4.5%
2010	407		16.0%
2020	357		−12.3%
U.S. Decennial Census

As of the census of 2000, there were 351 people, 119 households, and 84 families residing in the village. The population density was 162.5 inhabitants per square mile (62.7/km^{2}). There were 131 housing units at an average density of 60.6 per square mile (23.4/km^{2}). The racial makeup of the village was 98.01% White, and 1.99% from two or more races.

There were 119 households, out of which 31.1% had children under the age of 18 living with them, 52.1% were married couples living together, 12.6% had a female householder with no husband present, and 28.6% were non-families. 20.2% of all households were made up of individuals, and 7.6% had someone living alone who was 65 years of age or older. The average household size was 2.88 and the average family size was 3.35.

In the village, the population was spread out, with 29.3% under the age of 18, 12.3% from 18 to 24, 25.1% from 25 to 44, 21.9% from 45 to 64, and 11.4% who were 65 years of age or older. The median age was 32 years. For every 100 females, there were 93.9 males. For every 100 females age 18 and over, there were 89.3 males.

The median income for a household in the village was $31,786, and the median income for a family was $33,750. Males had a median income of $25,250 versus $21,250 for females. The per capita income for the village was $19,333. About 15.9% of families and 21.4% of the population were below the poverty line, including 28.7% of those under age 18 and 29.4% of those age 65 or over.

== Climate ==
This climatic region is typified by large seasonal temperature differences, with warm to hot (and often humid) summers and cold (sometimes severely cold) winters. According to the Köppen Climate Classification system, Altmar has a humid continental climate, abbreviated "Dfb" on climate maps.
