= Alfred, New York =

- Town
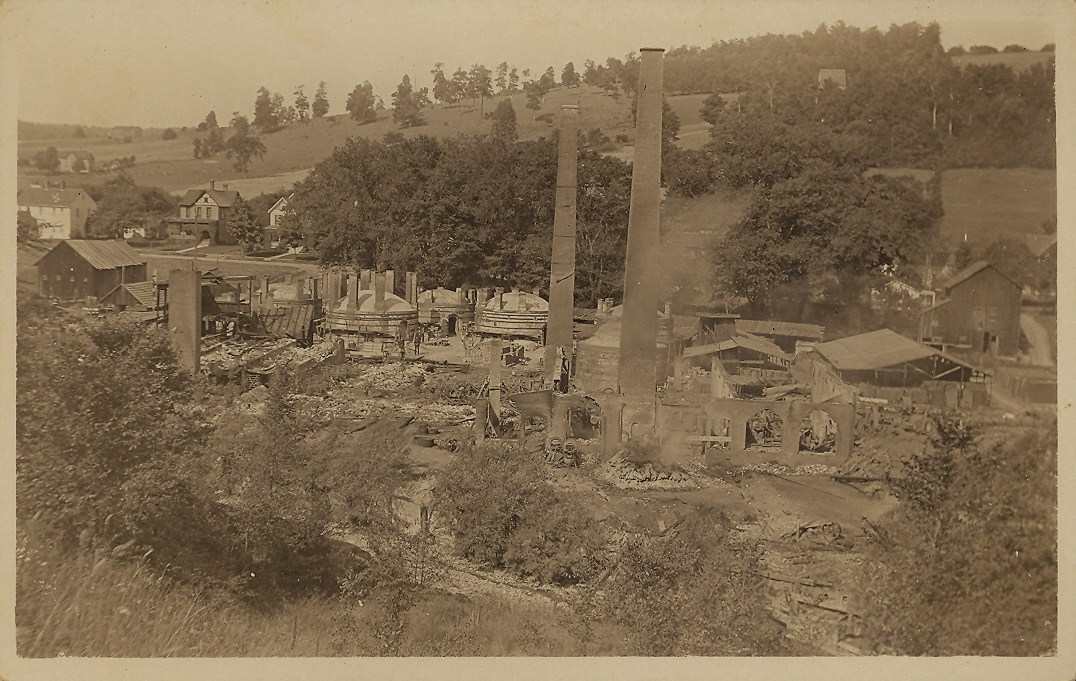
- Remains of the Celadon Terra Cotta Tile Co. fire, December 1909

- Logo

- Location within New York Location within the United States
- Coordinates: 42°15′22″N 77°47′23″W
- Country: United States
- State: New York
- County: Allegany
- Incorporated: 1808

Government
  - Supervisor: Fion MacCrea
  - Deputy Supervisor: Matthew Snyder Town Council: Brad Burdick; Jesse Szalc; Stefanie Burdick

Area
  - Total: 31.63 sq mi (81.91 km^{2})
  - Land: 31.48 sq mi (81.52 km^{2})
  - Water: 0.15 sq mi (0.39 km^{2})
- Elevation: 1,916 ft (584 m)

Population (2020)
  - Total: 4,896 ▼
  - Estimate (2021): 4,880
  - Density: 161.5/sq mi (62.36/km^{2})
- Time zone: UTC-5 (EST)
  - Summer (DST): UTC-4 (EDT)
- ZIP Codes: 14802 (Alfred village); 14803 (Alfred Station); 14804 (Almond); 14806 (Andover)
- Area code: 607
- FIPS code: 36-003-01209
- Website: townofalfredny.gov

Alfred is a town in Allegany County, New York, United States. The population was 4,896 at the 2020 census.

The town has an eponymous village at its center.

Alfred University and Alfred State College are located in the village of Alfred.

== History ==
=== Early history ===
"The Seneca Indians were the original owners of this land, but following the American victory in the American Revolutionary War, "all foreign claims of ownership were extinguished, and the power of the Indian Confederacy was broken... but New York and Massachusetts each claimed ownership under conflicting patents. In 1786 New York conceded the lands to Massachusetts but retained the sovereignty." Ownership of the land changed hands several times until 1791, when "most of the lands of Alfred were sold to the settlers at from $2 to $4 per acre."

"The earliest settlers followed Indian trails, the chief one leading from Fort Niagara to and down the Canisteo, Chemung and Susquehanna rivers. This passed near the northeastern corner of Alfred and had become well worn by war parties during the Revolution. Settlers from the far east might come by Albany, and the Schoharie and Susquehanna valleys or by Schenectady, Utica, Geneva and Bath. Whatever way they chose the roads were mostly bridgeless and of the most primitive kind, making travel tedious and difficult. From Hornellsville westward for many years the only roads were little more than wood paths marked by 'blazed trees'."

"The naming of Alfred has traditionally been attributed to Alfred the Great. That attribution may never be definitively verified because there appears to be no extant document from the period when the town was named that ties it to King Alfred – i.e., no town, county, or state record regarding the source of the name. Despite that missing documentation—There is, however, evidence in support of the legend, and there are no records that point to any other source for the name. Nineteenth-century accounts do cite Alfred the Great as the source. In addition, there was no early settler named Alfred (first or last name) for whom the town might have been named."

=== 19th century ===
"1807: The first settlers moved in the Alfred area, began clearing forests and building log cabins in order to bring their families in. These settlers were three men – Seventh Day Baptists – from Berlin and Brookfield, New York: Clark Crandall, Nathan Green, and Edward Green. Crandall later became a county judge and joined the state legislature." "The original settlers were mainly Seventh day Baptists. Their first church in this country was organized by members who withdrew from the First Baptist church at Newport, R. I., in 1671. This church was the sixth Baptist church organized in America, and they differed from their mother church only in the observance of the "seventh day," or Saturday, as the Sabbath. During the latter half of the 17th century, and the whole of the 18th, this people established strong settlements in the southwestern part of Rhode Island, chiefly in Westerly and Hopkinton. Out of these by 1800 grew strong settlements and churches in Rensselaer, Jefferson, Madison, Cortland and other counties of this state. From these out-stations and from the original settlements emigration set westward to the 'Genesee country'."

Allegany County was re-organized on March 11, 1808. "At the same time, the town of Alfred was named and organized by the state legislature as one of five towns formed from the larger town (actually co-extensive with the county) of Angelica: Angelica, Alfred, Caneadea, Nunda, and Ossian."

"The log schoolhouse early sprang up in each neighborhood, and the district school, the singing-school, the spelling-school and the Sabbath-meeting became a part of the life of the community. As prosperity permitted, the large frame-barn took the place of the pole-sided, straw-shingled stable, and a little later the frame house, with its shaved shingle roof, much smaller generally than the barn, replaced the log hut as the family dwelling." "Amos Crandall, called 'Deacon Crandall' and originally from Rhode Island, taught school four winters at $10 per month, boarding himself and taking his pay in produce or labor. He was one of the earliest teachers of singing schools in the town, and established the first Sabbath school."

"The first business of the settlers in Alfred was to make "clearings." The ashes, carefully saved from the burned fallows and converted into potash, was the first source of revenue. The making of maple sugar supplied home requirement and the surplus, bartered with the merchant, helped to secure needed family supplies. Lumber had little value beyond the cost of making, on account of lack of roads and a market. Those who could hunt could in that way help supply themselves with food, especially if they were fortunate enough to secure the bounty offered for the killing of wolves. Flax was raised, prepared by hand, carded, spun, woven and converted into clothing. When it became possible sheep were raised and their wool formed, entirely by hand processes, into clothing. Few indeed were the early homes into which the cards, the spinning-wheel, the flag-wheel, the quill-wheel, the swifts, the warping-bars, and loom did not find an early entrance. Oxen were in general use because considered more economical and useful than horses. The virgin soil, enriched by the ashes of the burned timber, was highly productive; and when the seasons were favorable, good crops of grain rewarded the farmer's toil among the roots and stumps. Year by year the clearings widened, orchards were planted, flocks and herds increased and roads became more passable. Here and there a mill was built, and a few small stores were opened."

"The first settlers were, for the most part, sons of soldiers of the Revolution, and themselves soldiers of the war of 1812. Alfred's sons were conspicuous in the border warfare in Kansas. At the opening of the Rebellion they were prompt to respond to the call for volunteers... The names of nearly 150 of her boys are on her roll of honor. Four or five of the professors and hundreds of Alfred students fought in the Union ranks, many attaining high rank."

Alfred became home to an institution of higher education in 1832, when Alfred University was founded. The college was coeducational from its inception and tried to provide practical as well as liberal education for students. This university was initially considered the principal seat of higher learning supported by the Seventh Day Baptists although it was not directly supported by the denomination.

In 1888 the Celadon Terra Cotta Company was founded after the discovery of high-quality clay in the town. The company grew over the next decade to become a leading producer of roof tile and architectural terra cotta. "These works have cost $150,000 and employ from 20 to 50 men. Tile of improved patterns excelling any other manufactured in America is shipped to every part of the country. Extensive pressed-brick works have also been established at Alfred Station [by the Alfred Clay Company]." The presence of these two clay manufacturers helped to establish Alfred as a ceramics hub, and led to the local university being selected as the home of the New York State College of Ceramics in 1900.

=== 20th century ===
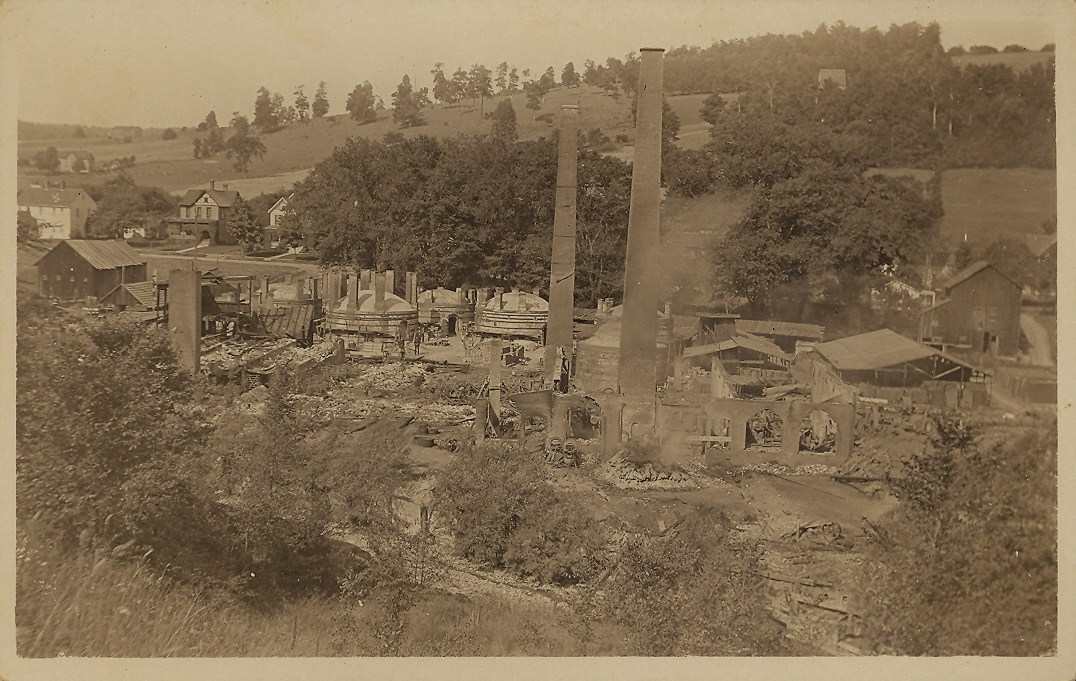
Remains of Alfred's Celadon factory after fire, December 1909

The new college recruited British ceramicist Charles Fergus Binns as a director and professor. Binns was a proponent of the Arts and Crafts movement and considered it essential for a student of ceramics to understand both the artistic and technical aspects of their craft. Under his leadership the college grew into a leading institution of ceramic studies, eventually developing separate schools for ceramic art and ceramic engineering. As a result of the college's prominence, Alfred remained a hub for ceramics even after the burning of the Celadon Terra Cotta Company's local factory in 1909.

A statutory agricultural school was formed at Alfred University in 1908, with a farm, livestock, and farm machinery for trade education. In 1937 a school of Engineering Technology was formed at this college, and in 1948 the entire college was spun off from Alfred University to form Alfred State College.

== Higher education ==
Alfred is home to three higher educational institutions: Alfred University, Alfred State College, and the New York State College of Ceramics at Alfred University.

Alfred University was started in 1836, by seventh day Baptists, as part of the Alfred Select teacher's college and is one of the oldest coeducational institutions in the US. Alfred University offers more than 40 majors and courses of study in 5 colleges and schools; its enrollment status is approximately 2,000 graduate and undergraduate students each year.

Alfred State College was founded as the New York State College of Agriculture at Alfred University in 1908. In 1948 the state legislature formed the State University of New York system with the Alfred College of Agriculture and Technology, or Ag-Tech, as one of its founding members. Alfred State College has about 3,400 undergraduate students in many areas of study including information technology, nursing, surveying, court reporting, and web development.

The New York State College of Ceramics is a statutory college of the State University of New York operated by Alfred University on behalf of the SUNY board of trustees. It was founded in 1900 as the New York State School of Clay-working and Ceramics at Alfred University.

== Geography ==
According to the United States Census Bureau, the town has a total area of 31.6 square miles (81.8 km^{2}), of which 31.5 square miles (81.7 km^{2}) is land and 0.1 square mile (0.2 km^{2}) (0.19%) is water.

New York State Route 244 passes across the town and terminates at New York State Route 21 near Alfred Station. County roads 10, 11, 12 and 42 pass through the Town of Alfred.

There is a small stream known as Canacadea Creek, that flows throughout the year from south to north. This stream flows to the Canisteo River, which is a tributary to the Susquehanna River watershed. The topography is steep hill country as it is part of the Allegheny Plateau, being the northern part of the Appalachian Mountain chain.

=== Climate ===
This climatic region is typified by large seasonal temperature differences, with warm to hot (and often humid) summers and cold (sometimes severely cold) winters. According to the Köppen Climate Classification system, Alfred has a humid continental climate, abbreviated "Dfb" on climate maps.

Climate data for Alfred, New York (1991–2020)
Month	Jan	Feb	Mar	Apr	May	Jun	Jul	Aug	Sep	Oct	Nov	Dec	Year
Mean daily maximum °F (°C)	31.8 (−0.1)	34.7 (1.5)	43.4 (6.3)	56.2 (13.4)	68.9 (20.5)	76.5 (24.7)	80.5 (26.9)	78.6 (25.9)	71.2 (21.8)	59.6 (15.3)	46.7 (8.2)	36.4 (2.4)	57.0 (13.9)
Daily mean °F (°C)	21.8 (−5.7)	23.6 (−4.7)	31.5 (−0.3)	43.1 (6.2)	54.9 (12.7)	63.3 (17.4)	67.2 (19.6)	65.5 (18.6)	58.4 (14.7)	47.7 (8.7)	36.7 (2.6)	27.9 (−2.3)	45.1 (7.3)
Mean daily minimum °F (°C)	11.8 (−11.2)	12.5 (−10.8)	19.7 (−6.8)	30.0 (−1.1)	41.0 (5.0)	50.1 (10.1)	54.0 (12.2)	52.4 (11.3)	45.5 (7.5)	35.8 (2.1)	26.6 (−3.0)	19.4 (−7.0)	33.2 (0.7)
Average precipitation inches (mm)	2.37 (60)	1.73 (44)	2.49 (63)	3.16 (80)	3.35 (85)	3.85 (98)	3.81 (97)	3.81 (97)	3.74 (95)	3.68 (93)	2.82 (72)	2.89 (73)	37.7 (957)
Average snowfall inches (cm)	18.6 (47)	18.1 (46)	16.9 (43)	3.7 (9.4)	0.1 (0.25)	0.0 (0.0)	0.0 (0.0)	0.0 (0.0)	0.0 (0.0)	0.3 (0.76)	6.5 (17)	18.0 (46)	82.2 (209.41)
Source: NOAA

== Demographics ==
Historical population
Census	Pop.	Note	%±
1820	1,701		—
1830	1,416		−16.8%
1840	1,630		15.1%
1850	2,679		64.4%
1860	1,367		−49.0%
1870	1,555		13.8%
1880	1,526		−1.9%
1890	1,699		11.3%
1900	1,615		−4.9%
1910	1,590		−1.5%
1920	1,269		−20.2%
1930	1,404		10.6%
1940	1,410		0.4%
1950	2,862		103.0%
1960	3,730		30.3%
1970	4,875		30.7%
1980	6,191		27.0%
1990	5,791		−6.5%
2000	5,140		−11.2%
2010	5,237		1.9%
2020	4,896		−6.5%
2021 (est.)	4,880	▼	−0.3%
U.S. Decennial Census

As of the census of 2000, there were 5,140 people, 996 households, and 468 families residing in the town. The population density was 163.0 inhabitants per square mile (62.9/km^{2}). There were 1,134 housing units at an average density of 36.0 per square mile (13.9/km^{2}). The racial makeup of the town was 91.79% White, 3.46% Black or African American, 0.25% Native American, 2.47% Asian, 0.02% Pacific Islander, 0.95% from other races, and 1.05% from two or more races. Hispanic or Latino of any race were 2.26% of the population.

There were 996 households, out of which 21.0% had children under the age of 18 living with them, 40.3% were married couples living together, 4.3% had a female householder with no husband present, and 53.0% were non-families. 33.0% of all households were made up of individuals, and 9.3% had someone living alone who was 65 years of age or older. The average household size was 2.28 and the average family size was 2.99.

In the town, the population was spread out, with 8.3% under the age of 18, 66.8% from 18 to 24, 9.7% from 25 to 44, 10.2% from 45 to 64, and 5.0% who were 65 years of age or older. The median age was 21 years. For every 100 females, there were 135.2 males. For every 100 females age 18 and over, there were 138.2 males.

The median income for a household in the town was $32,067, and the median income for a family was $57,159. Males had a median income of $28,667 versus $29,821 for females. The per capita income for the town was $10,785. About 2.4% of families and 22.5% of the population were below the poverty line, including 3.3% of those under age 18 and 3.1% of those age 65 or over.

== Communities and locations in the Town of Alfred ==
- Alfred – The Village of Alfred is located in the north-central part of the town.
- Alfred Station – A hamlet northeast of Alfred village on Route 244.
- Alfred Center – A former hamlet on Whitney Valley Creek.
- Dykes Creek – an important stream in the town's south that flows to Andover and then to Wellsville where it joins the Genesee River.
- East Valley – The Valley to the east of the Railroad Valley. This leads all the way to Andover and is mostly parallel to Railroad Valley separated predominantly by Ben Socer Hill.
- Five Corners – A hamlet west of Alfred village on Route 244 where County Roads 10(Vandermark Road) and 11(McHenry Valley Road) intersect Route 244 and the Town Roads of Hanneman Road and Moland Hill Road.
- Jericho Hill – A hill south of the Village of Alfred on County Road 12 or Jericho Hill Road. Alfred University maintains a playing field for rugby and another for football on this hill top.
- Pine Hill – A hill [elevation] east of Alfred village.
- Railroad Valley – The next valley to the east of the Village of Alfred which contains Tip Top
- Tip Top – An area southeast of Alfred village on Route 21 known as the highest point along the old Erie-Lackawanna Railroad.
- Tinkertown – A hamlet northeast of Alfred village on Route 244. Known for its strip of stores and houses in a tight valley.
- Whitney Valley Creek – An important stream in the north of the town that flows eventually into the Canisteo River and then into the Susquehanna River basin.

== Notable people ==
- Eva Allen Alberti (1856–1938), dramatics teacher
- Flora A. Brewster (1852–1919), physician, surgeon
- Joseph Goodrich (1800–1867), pioneer
- John Tuttle (born 1958), long-distance runner
