= Almond (village), New York =

Almond, New York
- Village
- Location within the state of New York Almond (the United States) Almond (North America)
- Coordinates: 42°19′14″N 77°44′19″W
- Country: United States
- State: New York
- Counties: Allegany, Steuben
- Towns: Almond, Hornellsville

Government
  - Type: Village Board
  - Mayor: John Meehan

Area
  - Total: 0.56 sq mi (1.46 km^{2})
  - Land: 0.56 sq mi (1.46 km^{2})
  - Water: 0 sq mi (0.00 km^{2})
- Elevation: 1,335 ft (407 m)

Population (2020)
  - Total: 415
  - Density: 735.4/sq mi (283.93/km^{2})
- Time zone: UTC-5 (Eastern (EST))
  - Summer (DST): UTC-4 (EDT)
- ZIP code: 14804
- Area code: 607
- FIPS code: 36-01440
- GNIS feature ID: 942389
- Website: www.villageofalmondny.org

Almond is a village located partially in the town of Almond in Allegany County, and partially in the town of Hornellsville in Steuben County, New York, United States. The population was 466 at the 2010 census.

== History ==
The first people to settle in the Karr Valley area came from Luzerne County, Pennsylvania in 1796. After the legal formation of Allegany County, New York in 1806, the area that would become Almond was initially a part of the town of Alfred, New York. In 1821, Almond was separated from Alfred by an "act of Legislature."

Notably, the area was not named after the almond tree nut, but rather after the Almond River near Edinburgh, Scotland, from where its settlers came. The village's residents pronounce the town's name with the Scottish pronunciation, which is closer to "Ellmund".

In the early 1800s, Almond "thrived... with many mills and factories popping up along the narrow creek and Main Street." However, the town's economic growth was limited by the size of the narrow valley it inhabited, and was reportedly "maxed out" in the 1840s. As a result, new businesses opted to move into neighboring towns like Hornell. By the early 1900s, the town's economy had stagnated significantly; old factories burned down and owners opted to rebuild in other locations, rather than in Almond.

== Geography ==
According to the United States Census Bureau, the village has a total area of 0.6 square mile (1.5 km^{2}), all land.

Canacadea Creek flows through the village. The Southern Tier Expressway (Interstate 86 and New York State Route 17) and New York State Route 21 pass through the village.

== Demographics ==
Historical population
Census	Pop.	Note	%±
1930	438		—
1940	533		21.7%
1950	659		23.6%
1960	696		5.6%
1970	658		−5.5%
1980	568		−13.7%
1990	458		−19.4%
2000	461		0.7%
2010	466		1.1%
2020	415		−10.9%
U.S. Decennial Census

As of the census of 2000, there were 461 people, 194 households, and 117 families residing in the village. The population density was 816.3 inhabitants per square mile (315.2/km^{2}). There were 214 housing units at an average density of 378.9 per square mile (146.3/km^{2}). The racial makeup of the village was 97.83% White, 0.87% Asian, 0.87% from other races, and 0.43% from two or more races. Hispanic or Latino of any race were 0.87% of the population.

There were 194 households, out of which 28.4% had children under the age of 18 living with them, 46.4% were married couples living together, 11.9% had a female householder with no husband present, and 39.2% were non-families. 34.5% of all households were made up of individuals, and 11.9% had someone living alone who was 65 years of age or older. The average household size was 2.38 and the average family size was 3.09.

In the village, the population was spread out, with 26.9% under the age of 18, 8.5% from 18 to 24, 27.3% from 25 to 44, 24.9% from 45 to 64, and 12.4% who were 65 years of age or older. The median age was 36 years. For every 100 females, there were 88.2 males. For every 100 females age 18 and over, there were 88.3 males.

The median income for a household in the village was $31,000, and the median income for a family was $42,000. Males had a median income of $35,714 versus $21,563 for females. The per capita income for the village was $18,509. About 11.5% of families and 16.6% of the population were below the poverty line, including 27.3% of those under age 18 and 8.2% of those age 65 or over.

== Notable people ==
- Carol Fenner, author
