= WVTT-CD =

Television station in Olean, New York

WVTT-CD and WWHC-LD
Olean–Buffalo, New York; United States
- Channels for WVTT-CD: Digital: 11 (VHF), applied for 18 (UHF); Virtual: 34
- Channels for WWHC-LD: Digital: 20 (UHF), to move to 17 (UHF); Virtual: 20

Programming
- Affiliations: see § Subchannels

Ownership
- Owner: Innovate Corp.; (HC2 Station Group, Inc./DTV America Corporation)

History
- First air date: WVTT-CD: April 12, 1989; WWHC-LD: March 7, 1986
- Former call signs: WVTT-CD: W25AK (1987–1999); WONS-LP (1999–2012); WVTT-CA (2012–2014); WWHC-LD: W20AB (1986–2017); WWHC-LP (2017–2020)
- Former channel number: WVTT-CD: Analog: 25 (UHF, 1989–2014); Digital: 34 (UHF, 2014–2020); WWHC-LD: Analog: 20 (UHF, 1986–1998)
- Former affiliations: WVTT-CD: ACTS/Tempo (1986–1988); FN, A1/AIN/N1 (until 1999); UPN (1999–2003); UATV/Shop at Home (2003–2006); The Sportsman Channel (2006–2009); America One/Youtoo America (2009–2017); This TV (2017–2019)
- Call sign meaning: WVTT-CD: Voice of the Twin Tiers (from WVTT-FM, now WCOR-FM)

Technical information
- Licensing authority: FCC
- Facility ID: WVTT-CD: 10869; WWHC-LD: 10868
- Class: WVTT-CD: CD; WWHC-LD: LD
- ERP: WVTT-CD: 3 kW; 15 kW (application); WWHC-LD: 3 kW; 15 kW (CP)
- HAAT: WVTT-CD: 230.9 m (758 ft); 107.1 m (351 ft) (application); WWHC-LD: 220.9 m (725 ft); 101.1 m (332 ft) (CP)
- Transmitter coordinates: WVTT-CD: 42°43′7″N 78°33′46″W; 43°0′18″N 78°59′33″W (application); WWHC-LD: 42°43′7″N 78°33′46″W; 43°0′18″N 78°59′33″W (CP)

Links
- Public license information: WVTT-CD: Public file; LMS; WWHC-LD: Public file; LMS

WVTT-CD (channel 34) and WWHC-LD (channel 20) are low-power television stations licensed to Olean, New York, United States, serving the Buffalo area. Owned by Innovate Corp., the stations share transmitter facilities on Warner Hill Road in South Wales, New York.

== History ==
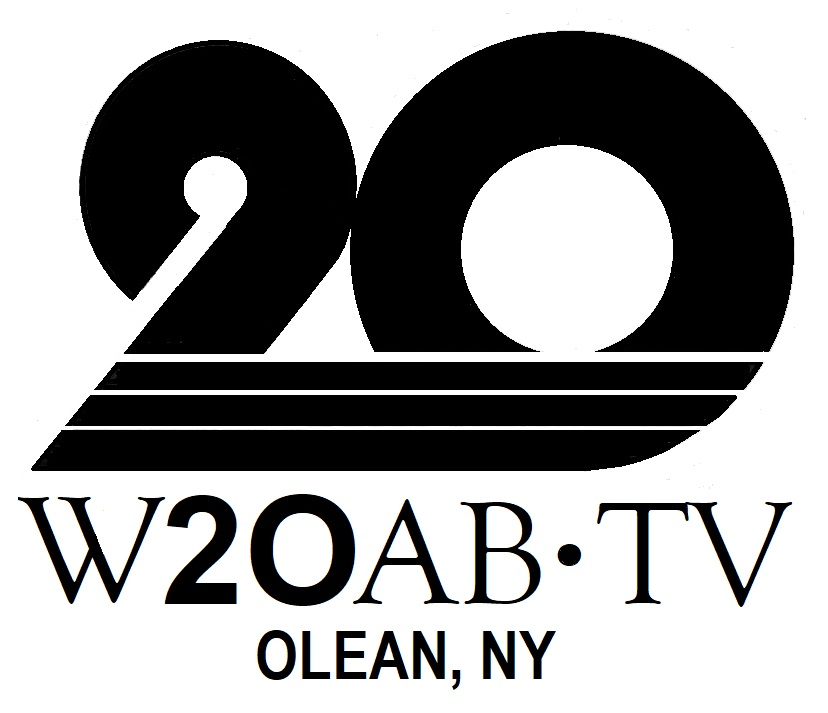
Original logo for W20AB

WVTT-CD first signed on March 7, 1986, as W20AB on channel 20 by Choice Olean Television, Inc. and was affiliated with the American Christian Television System (ACTS) and Tempo Television. The station was the first station to broadcast from the city, and the first television station in the Southern Tier of Western New York to prove to be commercially viable; WNYP-TV (channel 26), an earlier effort based in Jamestown, failed after only three years in the late 1960s and was passed on to a religious broadcaster.

Channel 20 was broadcast from the roof of the Palace Theater building in downtown Olean, but its signal was not well received outside of the city proper. The station acquired channel 25 (known then as W25AK) on August 24, 1987, as a repeater of the channel 20 signal, and signed on the air on April 12, 1989. The Palace Theater building was demolished in 1998 causing the channel 20 signal to go dark; its license, however, remains active as of 2013. Channel 25 became the primary channel for the station and changed its call sign to WONS-LP ("Olean's News Source") on March 8, 1999, gaining the shared UPN affiliation with Buffalo station WNGS (channel 67). The new UPN 25 held on to its affiliation until WNGS was added to the Olean-area cable line-up. WONS-LP later began to carry programming from the Urban America Television Network and Shop at Home Network, as well as a small share of local content. WONS-LP has also had past affiliations with FamilyNet, America One Network (A1), the American Independent Network (AIN), and Network One. The station was also among the initial affiliates of Main Street TV, the forerunner of America One. In 2006, Urban America and Shop at Home both ceased operations. The channel was then affiliated with The Sportsman Channel until that network moved exclusively to cable in 2009. America One once again listed the station as one of their affiliates as of 2011. That network merged with Youtoo TV in 2015.

WONS-LP's operations were taken over by Colonial Radio Group, owners of WBYB, WXMT and WVTT, in October 2011. The call sign was changed to WVTT-CA (matching Colonial's talk radio station) in February 2012. On April 29, 2013, Colonial ended its involvement with the station, but the two stations would share control of the WVTT calls until Colonial relinquished them in 2018. In June 2013, Choice Tower Rentals announced the sale of WVTT-CA, as well as the still-active W20AB license, to Milachi Media (an alias for William and Paige Christian, who also own stakes in Waypoint Media; the deal will put the station under common ownership with WYDC (channel 48) and WJKP-LD (channel 39) in Corning, WBGT-CD (channel 46) in Rochester, and several Elmira/Corning radio stations. (Waypoint later transferred the license to another shell company, "Novia Communications", then to "Woodland Communications", both of which have the same principal owners.) In 2014, the company acquired radio stations WMXO, WOEN, WGGO and WQRS in Cattaraugus County, making the four stations sister stations to WVTT-CA.

On December 17, 2014, the station was licensed for digital operation, changing its call sign to WVTT-CD. Its channel 34 was previously used by WNYO-TV prior to the full-power analog shutdown in 2009; as part of the change, WVTT's broadcast transmitter was relocated from Olean to its current location on the Machias–Yorkshire town line, a considerable distance from Olean with a much broader signal capable of covering most of Western New York; it remains licensed to Olean. To accommodate the move, WVTT's virtual channel changed from 25 to 34, as the move brought the signal within range of CBLFT, also on channel 25 out of Toronto. W20AB's license was given the call sign WWHC-LP, with the signal now operating using WVTT's former broadcast area mostly confined to the city of Olean. As of 2020, both WVTT and WWHC are off the air; construction permit applications were filed to move WWHC to WVTT's current location and move WVTT to the current WGRZ tower in South Wales, New York, with intent to return both stations to air in August.

In 2017, WVTT accepted an offer of over $9,000,000 to move to the high-VHF spectrum, down from its UHF position, in the FCC's spectrum incentive auction. When the station moved on March 13, 2020, it occupied channel 11 (Channel 34 was taken over by ABC affiliate WKBW-TV (channel 7), which moved down the dial from 38). The station also changed affiliations to This TV, some time after March 2017 (after WBBZ-DT2 had dropped the affiliation); This TV affiliated with WBXZ-LP (channel 56) on its twelfth digital subchannel in August 2019. Decades and Movies!, two Weigel Broadcasting subchannels, were added on June 1, 2018. Both moved to WBBZ (which carries Weigel's main network MeTV) on July 1, 2020.

In 2018, the WWHC license was traded to DTV America Corporation in exchange for ABC affiliate WPBY-LD (channel 35) in Lafayette, Indiana. On August 6, DTV America's parent company HC2 Holdings purchased the WVTT-CD license.

As of 2025, construction permits have been granted to both stations to move to adjacent channel 17 and 18 allocations operating from the WUTV transmitter on Grand Island and change the city of license to Buffalo, formally eliminating over-the-air television service in Olean.

In February 2026, WVTT-CD suffered damage to its transmitter and went silent.

== Local programming ==
Despite existing in one of the smallest markets in the United States (Nielsen does not even recognize it as a separate designated market area, instead listing it as a subset of the Buffalo market) and the lack of a major network affiliation, channels 20 and 25 had a long history of local programming. The station, at various times in its history, carried a local newscast and several other local programs, most of which were public affairs and interview shows.

=== News operation ===
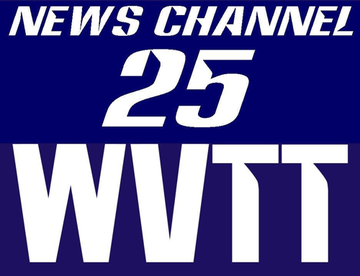
"NewsChannel 25" logo under Colonial stewardship.

WVTT-CA resumed local newscasts, including a simulcast of WVTT-FM's morning show and an evening newscast, from October 7, 2011, until April 29, 2013. WVTT-CA operated a staff of approximately a half-dozen reporters but did not have a weather or sports department, although Blaise O'Connor returned to the station for a short time (the only weather forecasts WVTT-CA used were hastily tacked on, rip-and-read radio style, to the end of each evening newscast; its morning newscast forecasts were phoned in by radio meteorologist Jim Renaldi, who continues to forecast for WVTT-FM). The evening newscast was, for its entire run under Colonial stewardship, anchored by Alexa Olson and Colonial CEO Jeff Andrulonis. The morning newscast was initially hosted by area radio veterans Michael Baldwin and Casey Hill, and later by former WESB morning host Josh Hatcher.

== Subchannels ==
The stations' signals are multiplexed:

Subchannels of WVTT-CD
Subchannel	Res.	Short name	Programming
34.1	480i	WVTT-CD	Defy
34.2	480i	WVTT-CD	Newsmax2
34.3	480i	WVTT-CD	Black Vision TV
34.4	480i	WVTT-CD	365BLK
34.5	480i	WVTT-CD	Outlaw
34.6	480i	WVTT-CD	NBC True CRMZ
34.7	480i	WVTT-CD	Cozi TV
34.8	480i	WVTT-CD	Infomercials (4:3)

Subchannels of WWHC-LD
Subchannel	Res.	Short name	Programming
20.1	480i	WWHC-LP	Infomercials (4:3)
20.2	480i	WWHC-LP	Confess
20.3	480i	WWHC-LP	Defy
20.4	480i	WWHC-LP	365BLK
20.5	480i	WWHC-LP	Outlaw
20.6	480i	WWHC-LP	NTD America
20.7	480i	WWHC-LP	Fubo Sports Network
