= WQLE =

Radio station in Kane, Pennsylvania (1954–1992)

Kane, Pennsylvania; United States
- Frequency: 960 kHz

Ownership
- Owner: Walter R. Pierre

History
- First air date: June 7, 1954
- Last air date: December 21, 1992
- Former call signs: WADP (1954–1965); WKZA (1965–1992)
- Former frequencies: 1590 kHz (February–September 1954)

Technical information
- Facility ID: 70795
- Power: 1,000 watts (day)
- Transmitter coordinates: 42°17′4.6″N 88°15′42.8″W

WQLE (960 AM) was the last official call sign of a now defunct radio station in Kane, Pennsylvania.

== History ==
=== McKean County's first full-time radio station ===
WQLE signed on as WADP on June 7, 1954, under the ownership of Northern Allegheny Broadcasting Company. Studios and offices were located inside the Penn-Kane Hotel, at the corner of Fraley and Greeves Streets in Kane. Transmitter facilities were located along Highland Road, outside of Kane. The construction permit to build the station was issued on February 24, 1954, which allowed the station to operate at the assigned frequency of 1590 kHz and at a daytime-only power of 500 watts. One year prior to WADP's inception, WFRM in Coudersport provided southern and central McKean County with local news service to its station from studios in Smethport, the county's seat, following a very positive response after doing a remote broadcast in town. However, local broadcasts that were exclusive to McKean County were only about an hour a day and generally confined to mornings, and it soon became obvious that this part of McKean County not only needed its own radio station, but was able to support one. Service from WESB in Bradford, which first went on the air in 1947, was barely able to be heard in the area due to the rugged mountain terrain literally splitting the county in two, as well as its Class C local frequency that provided a very limited signal. WHDL in Olean, New York also had some coverage in the northeastern portion of the county. WFRM, while having the better signal that blanketed McKean County, could only offer so much service to a county not its own. Two WFRM employees, Bob and Lois Johnson, who were part of the new WFRM studio operations in Smethport, left the station a short time later to assist in the startup of WADP.

The FCC granted WADP permission to move to 960 kHz one month later (its 1590 frequency would be reallocated to WGGO in Salamanca, New York a few years later), but it still operated as a daytime-only service, with its power output remaining at 500 watts. In November 1958, the FCC granted WADP permission to double its power to 1,000 watts, retaining its daytime-only status.

On April 1, 1959, WADP was acquired by Kane Broadcasting Corporation, a company headed by Gordon Hanks, who served as the company's president and general manager. On July 1, 1965, the station was sold again to WKZA Broadcasting Company, headed by general manager Edward Lenaway and his wife Rita. Concurrently, the station's call letters were changed to WKZA.

On May 1, 1981, WKZA was purchased by Bilbat Radio, a Hornell, New York-based ownership cluster that last owned radio station WHHO and operated WKPQ. Under its corporate name of Raise Kane Radio Inc., it became one of the most listened to stations in McKean County, and faced very little competition outside Bradford-based WESB.

In December 1981, WKZA faced its first direct competition from a brand new station, WRXZ-FM, but WKZA, still a daytime-only station, was easily winning the battle as WRXZ, rechristened as WIFI the year after its debut, lost money and went off the air.

=== Decline ===
However, in 1987, WIFI changed ownership and call signs to WLMI, and with that received a massive cash infusion to challenge WKZA, which by this time, had been granted authorization by the FCC to operate at a power of 48 watts at night and 24-hour broadcasting rights (but chose to shut down daily at midnight). The new ownership, headed by wealthy industrialist and Pittsburgh Pirates minority owner Dennis Heindl, resulted in an almost immediate success for WLMI.

WKZA staffers began to defect to WLMI, and the downhill spiral began. Though WLMI relied on satellite-delivered programming for music and DJs, it also aired heavy amounts of local news, weather and sports in volumes that were more characteristic of an AM station than an FM station. This programming formula quickly became popular with the community at large and now listeners of WKZA were tuning out in droves. With the station's future at stake, Bilbat Radio put the station up for sale that year. WLMI showed little interest in acquiring its AM counterpart, and WKZA was sold to another owner a year later.

=== Sale and failure ===
WKZA was sold to Bill Shannon in 1990, but quickly changed hands again to Walter R. Pierre in December 1991. Despite the ownership licensee changes, the land south of Kane in Wetmore Township, upon which the station's studio, office, and transmitter facilities remained in the name of Raise Kane Radio, according to McKean County court documents. The lack of revenue was quickly catching up with WKZA, as it started showing obvious signs of its inevitable destiny as the facility started to fall into disrepair and revenues necessary for repair and maintenance were gone.

Pierre switched to a short-lived oldies format to try and lure its older listeners back and changed the call letters to what would be the station's final call sign, WQLE, in a last-ditch attempt to save the station. However, the newly christened WQLE, presumably unable to continue paying ASCAP/BMI fees necessary to broadcast music, switched from oldies to an all-talk populism-based format by Chuck Harder's "For the People" nonprofit network that shared its revenues with its affiliate stations, many of which were financially distressed like WQLE. Pierre and operations manager Robert Wall were the station's only two employees, trying to keep costs as low as possible until positive revenue was generated. The "For the People" partnership and the efforts of Pierre and Wall to sell local commercials were unable to generate revenue substantial enough to keep WQLE on the air.

Despite their best efforts, the venture was ultimately unsuccessful. On December 21, 1992, WQLE 960 suddenly went silent without explanation. It never formally forfeited its license, which expired on August 1, 1998, and since no renewal paperwork was filed, it was officially canceled on February 4, 1999.

=== Aftermath ===
FCC officials were surprised to learn in 1994 that the station had ceased operations when an inquiry had been made to the FCC's AM Services Bureau to purchase the license that was thought to have been forfeited. The interested party was Pittsburgh area broadcaster Ken Hawk, who had previously managed WKPA (now WMNY) in New Kensington. Because of the long, expensive and complicated process involved with returning an abandoned and long-neglected facility to the air, Hawk gave up his pursuit of returning WQLE to the air, and under reforms passed in the Telecommunications Act of 1996, the license was formally canceled and deleted from the FCC database.

The property upon which WQLE's studio, office and transmitter facilities were located, was sold in 1994 to local businessmen Nick Petruney and Larry Groesch, who had the intent of building a self-storage rental facility on the lot, which later came to fruition. The tower, badly rusted, dark, and beyond all repair, was dismantled by 1997. The studio, office and transmitter building had heavy interior water damage from a badly-leaking roof that was never repaired and had collapsed in some offices, including the station's commercial production studio. As a result, much of the station's broadcasting and office equipment was destroyed, including the original Gates transmitter used since its 1948 inception, leaving virtually everything inside unsalvageable. This building was subsequently razed.

The WKZA calls currently reside on a radio station in Lakewood, New York, broadcasting on 106.9 MHz as a KISS-FM station.

As of 2017, the only radio service originating from Kane is low-powered noncommercial outlet WXZY-LP on 101.7 MHz. Two other signals, a Family Life Network repeater carrying Christian radio and a repeater of NPR affiliate WPSU-FM, are licensed to Kane.

Incidentally, Bilbat's last radio holding, and only other AM station, WHHO, was forced to give up its license as well in January 2010. The company was forced to sell off WKPQ to another ownership group in 2009 due to financial problems and the death of one of the company partners.
