= WVTT =

WVTT may refer to:

- WVTT-CD, on TV channel 11 (virtual 34) and licensed to Olean, New York
- WCOP (FM), a radio station (103.9 FM) licensed to serve Eldred, Pennsylvania, United States, which held the call sign WVTT in 2011 and again in 2019
- WCOR-FM, on 96.7 and licensed to Lewis Run, Pennsylvania, was WVTT from 2011 to 2019
