= WBYB =

WBYB may refer to:

- WBYB (FM), a radio station (98.3 FM) licensed to serve Cleveland, Mississippi, United States
- WCOP (FM), a radio station (103.9 FM) licensed to serve Eldred, Pennsylvania, United States, which held the call sign WBYB from 2011 to 2017
- WCOR-FM, a radio station (96.7 FM) licensed to serve Lewis Run, Pennsylvania, which held the call sign WBYB from 2009 to 2011
- WCMV-FM, a radio station (94.3 FM) licensed to serve Leland, Michigan, United States, which held the call sign WBYB from 1997 to 2003
- WMUV, a radio station (100.7 FM) licensed to Brunswick, Georgia, United States, which held the call sign WBYB from 1992 to 1995
