= WXMT =

Coordinates: 41.810°N 78.386°W

- Smethport, Pennsylvania; United States
- Broadcast area: Bradford, Pennsylvania
- Frequency: 106.3 MHz
- Branding: 106.3 The Mountain

Programming
- Format: Classic hits

Ownership
- Owner: Bulldog Sounds, LLC

History
- First air date: 1990
- Former call signs: WQRM (1990–2008)
- Call sign meaning: X Mountain

Technical information
- Licensing authority: FCC
- Facility ID: 21195
- Class: A
- ERP: 1,030 watts
- HAAT: 240.2 meters (788 ft)
- Repeater: 106.3 WXMT-FM1 (Bradford)

Links
- Public license information: Public file; LMS
- Webcast: Listen live
- Website: mountain1063radio.com

WXMT (106.3 FM) is a commercially licensed radio station licensed to Smethport, Pennsylvania, the seat of McKean County. The station broadcasts with an effective radiated power of 1,030 watts. WXMT is owned by Bulldog Sounds, who acquired the station from Ashley Midder's XMT Entertainment, LLC, in August of 2025.

Prior to 2008, the station was known as WQRM.

== History ==
=== Beginnings in 1953 ===
Though WQRM would not sign on the air until 1991, the foundation for local radio in Smethport was actually laid in the early 1950s.

Back in the summer of 1953, the Smethport Centennial Celebration was the first "special event" covered by WFRM, the new radio station in Coudersport just constructed by the Farm & Home Broadcasting Company, also the parent company of what would later become known as WQRM in 1991. Broadcast lines were installed and temporary broadcast facilities were put in place in Smethport to cover many of the Centennial activities. Pete and Bill, the stars of the Morning Show, were photographed in the derby hats that everyone in Smethport was wearing as part of the celebration. That photo is still on the wall at WFRM's present location at 9 South Main Street in downtown Coudersport.

Encouraged by the enthusiastic reception from folks in Smethport, WFRM decided to put a local office and studio in Smethport. It was located on the second floor of the Auto Parts store on West Main Street. Bob and Lois Johnson became the nucleus of the staff in Smethport and an effort was made to expand the service to this part of the WFRM Coverage area. Russ Wells was the announcer, and Bob Morrison was the engineer. An hour each day was broadcast over the radio from this studio. These daily broadcasts continued for about three years. Meanwhile, the Johnsons had relocated to Kane, and joined the staff that was building the new radio station there, WKZA AM 960, which went on the air in 1954, but has been silent since 1993.

=== Smethport tries for AM license ===
A few years later, Hamlin Redfield of Smethport applied to the Federal Communications Commission (FCC) for an AM station to operate on 910 kHz at 1,000 watts to be located in Smethport. This station was never built, and the construction permit was allowed to expire. Coincidentally, WXMT's current owners would later acquire an AM station on this same frequency at the end of 2015.

=== Thirty years later - WQRM signs on ===
In 1989, the FCC opened up a channel for an FM station to be licensed to Smethport through Docket 80-90, which expanded FM radio allocations in rural and suburban locations. Farm & Home applied for and was granted a permit to build. The longtime cable tower atop Prospect Mountain was selected as the place for the antenna for the station that would be known as WQRM. The same tower already in use by WHKS, Port Allegany, a separately owned radio station had gone on the air July 2, the previous year.

WQRM signed on the air for the very first time in 1991. A short time later, WQRM had its own studios and offices in downtown Smethport. Operations for WQRM at first came out of its sister FM station in neighboring Tioga County, WNBT and WNBT-FM, Wellsboro.

A site in downtown Smethport was chosen for the permanent studio and office. It was in the basement of the building at Fulton and Main Streets. However, the disastrous fire that destroyed that building forced the relocation of WQRM to a new office at 211 West Main Street. The station was heard at 106.3 throughout the area, but in Bradford, a special "translator" was authorized to rebroadcast on 99.3, since the 106.3 signal is weakened by the tall mountains surrounding the city.

Over the years, local resident Rosalie Bishop was the local manager and was active in arranging the programming, news coverage and special events, as well as contact with businesses using radio advertising. She hired and trained different persons to do broadcasting, news gathering and sales. In addition to the regular music programming, there were many special events and programs.

Broadcasts from local and area churches were eagerly awaited by listeners, as well as local news and events from the Fairgrounds. Smethport Hubbers football and basketball games have always been popular with WQRM's listeners, and in addition, some of the Otto-Eldred games were carried on the station. Sportscasters included Bill Lord, Jeff Switzer, Scott McGuire and Ron Deibler.

=== Colonial Radio Group era ===
In August 2008, WQRM's owner, Farm & Home Broadcasting (and its controlling interest, the Allegheny Mountain Radio Network) sold the station to Colonial Radio Group, owner of WLMI, a country station based in Kane. It had been speculated in media publications that a format change was forthcoming. The former 99.3 translator in Bradford switched from WQRM to the new WLMI Radio Network, but WLMI opted for a separate frequency in Smethport (95.3) to relay WLMI. A new format debuted in January 2009 as "The Mountain / 106.3 WXMT" billing itself as "Twin Tiers' Rock Without the Hard Edge" and featuring classic hits from the 1970s, 1980s, and 1990s.

Much like WLMI, WXMT started broadcasting in HD Radio as of January 2009. During Colonial's decade-long run as a station owner in the western Twin Tiers market, The Mountain was the only one of its three FM stations to maintain the same format throughout that time span and was also the most commercially successful of the three in the Nielsens.

=== After Colonial ===
On April 24, 2018, Colonial announced it had sold the station, along with sister stations WAGL (the former WLMI) and WVTT, to Rick Freeman in a deal involving cash and cryptocurrency. Freeman was supposed to take over the stations on May 1. The sale was never consummated.

Bob Lowe of Twilight Broadcasting, an upstart owner whose other recent purchases included the WKQW cluster in Oil City and WEEU in Reading, purchased the station from Colonial in November 2019. A few days after the sale agreement, on November 15, Twilight rebranded the station as "106.3 XMT". Twilight's classic hits format set up a three-way competition in the classic hits format between WXMT, WGWE and WOLY (WGWE dropped out of the competition in April 2021).

On June 23, 2021, less than two years after buying the station, Lowe sold the station to Ashley Midder at roughly the same price for which he had bought the station from Colonial. Midder and his brother Robert, born and raised in Olean, returned the station to its "Mountain" branding.

On November 1, 2023, Midder turned control of the station over to Bob Smith, who intended to purchase the station for $140,000. Smith was an employee of Seven Mountains Media, a broadcaster in the western Twin Tiers and one that was unable to purchase WXMT due to market ownership caps, and resigned his position with that company to buy the station. Approval of the sale took two years, eventually closing in August 2025.

== Programming ==
The Mountain's morning show, the Instant Breakfast, is hosted by Pab Sungenis, who also serves as the station's Operations Manager. The remainder of the day consists of voicetracked syndicated hosts, including John and Heidi and longtime market veteran Cindy Scott. Syndicated programs include Yacht Rock Radio and the 1980s episodes of Casey Kasem's American Top 40. On Sunday Mornings, WXMT also plays vintage radio shows from The Firesign Theatre.

WXMT continues to carry high school football from Smethport High School and is affiliated with the Motor Racing Network and Performance Racing Network for NASCAR coverage.
