= WOLY =

WOLY may refer to:

- WOLY (AM), a radio station (1450 AM) licensed to serve Olean, New York, United States
- WOLY (Michigan), a defunct radio station (1500 AM) formerly licensed to serve Battle Creek, Michigan, United States
