= WCGS (FM) =

Coordinates: 42.233°N 78.796°W

- Little Valley, New York; United States
- Broadcast area: Western Southern Tier; Southtowns
- Frequency: 105.9 MHz
- Branding: Family Life Network

Programming
- Format: Christian

Ownership
- Owner: Family Life Network; (Family Life Ministries, Inc.)

History
- First air date: February 1, 2010
- Former call signs: WGWE (2009–2022)
- Call sign meaning: "Where Christ Grants Salvation"

Technical information
- Licensing authority: FCC
- Facility ID: 166028
- Class: B1
- ERP: 7,000 watts
- HAAT: 191 meters (627 ft)

Links
- Public license information: Public file; LMS
- Website: familylife.org/radio

WCGS (105.9 FM) is a radio station licensed to Little Valley, New York. The station, with its tower on Kyler Hill near the border of Little Valley and Napoli, broadcasts at 5,500 watts, effective radiated power (ERP).

From 2010 to 2021, the Seneca Nation of New York operated the station as WGWE, carrying a locally originated classic hits format targeting the western Southern Tier; the station's signal gave strong coverage to both of the Seneca Nation's populated reservations as well as the cities of Dunkirk, Jamestown, Olean and Bradford, all within a 30-mile radius of Little Valley (such that the previous inhabitant of 105.9 in Jamestown, WOGM-LP, had to change frequencies to 104.7 to accommodate the new signal). It was this 11-year run that is most associated with the WGWE history. Pandemic-related disruptions and consolidation of the other radio stations in Cattaraugus County under one company prompted the Seneca Nation to abandon the station, in which it had previously invested heavily, in 2021.

A brief effort was made to repurpose the signal as a rimshot covering the southern suburbs of Buffalo, New York, when Paul Izard purchased the signal to simulcast his electronic dance music webcast. Izard shut down the station after six weeks and surrendered the license to the FCC.

The station's license was acquired by the Family Life Network effective September 8, 2022; on September 15, 2022, the station changed its call letters to WCGS.

== History ==
=== WGWE ===
WGWE's logo as a Seneca Nation-owned classic hits station, along with its mascot Rocky the Rockin' Raccoon.

The Seneca Nation had been attempting to enter the radio business for several years prior to WGWE's founding. In the immediate years before acquiring the station, it was applying for noncommercial licenses to operate from the Seneca Nation's capital of Irving. Mutual exclusivity conflicts with out-of-town religious broadcasters prevented these proposals from reaching the air.

The Seneca nation purchased WGWE's construction permit from Randy Michaels's holding company Radioactive, LLC in early 2009 and signed on February 1, 2010. The first song played on WGWE was "As Long as the Grass Shall Grow," a song by Peter La Farge about the Senecas' opposition to the Kinzua Dam that was performed by Johnny Cash on Bitter Tears: Ballads of the American Indian; it would continue to be played every Friday at noon through its entire existence. Originally a locally originated automated station for its first several months, the station began broadcasting what was then Citadel Media's Classic Hits Radio satellite format in late June 2010 in all shifts except weekday mornings and noon; the station disaffiliated from Classic Hits Radio in 2016. Mike "Smitty" Smith, former disc jockey at WPIG, was the station's first manager, hosting the morning drive time show and noon call-in request hours from studios inside the former Uni-Mart in Salamanca. Additional local hosts were added several months later.

Casey Hill and Jesse Garon, both of whom had previously worked with Smitty at WPIG, also held shifts at WGWE for several years before leaving Western New York. Former KFXM disc jockey "Double-D" Danny Dare also worked at the station for short stints in fall 2014 and in 2015. After Hill's and Garon's departures, for a brief time in the mid-2010s, dayparts outside of morning drive and noon were held by younger disc jockeys, including Erika J, JB's Jukebox, and the Austin Hill Show, whom Smith gave loose rein to experiment on-air (JB's Jukebox, for example, would frequently play two copies of the same record simultaneously, with JB using his finger to slightly slow down the CD speed and create a flange effect). Engineer Ace Boogie also held an afternoon drive airshift. Under Smith, the station used minimal jingles and an open-ended playlist ranging from the 1930s to the 1990s.

Smith retired from radio in 2016 to pursue the office of (and eventually serve four years as) mayor of Salamanca. Chris Russell, who had been program director at the cluster of WQRS and WGGO, took over as manager and morning drive host. Russell overhauled and streamlined the station's format into a more professionally styled presentation and more narrowly defined (but still slightly eclectic) playlist, also adding a roster of syndicated programming (much of it brought over from WGGO) on weekends, including reruns of Wolfman Jack and That Thing with Rich Appel. Under Russell's five-year tenure, the station's on-air lineup added market veteran Cindy Scott and held over Brett Maybee and Miss B from the Smitty era.

Throughout its existence, a portion of its programming was set aside for Native American content, including daily airings of National Native News and a local show devoted to native music, "Gae:no'." The station was also a partner for the Native American Music Awards, airing several ceremonies. The station also carried a roster of mostly local sports that included Buffalo Bandits indoor lacrosse, St. Bonaventure Bonnies women's basketball (the station was also slated to carry the college's men's lacrosse team but shut down before that team began play), high school athletics, Southern Tier Diesel adult amateur football, Olean Oilers collegiate summer baseball, and youth football and lacrosse. As recently as 2020, the Seneca Nation—which transferred WGWE to its Seneca Media and Communications Center arm under its direct control after Russell's arrival—had planned on maintaining and expanding the station, including the eventual addition of FM 96.7 as a simulcast, an agreement that ultimately lasted only three days.

=== Closure ===
With Seven Mountains Media buying out all three of WGWE's privately held competitors—Community Broadcasters, Andrulonis Media and Sound Communications; the Seneca Nation announced on March 1, 2021, that it would be shutting down WGWE on March 31, a decision made directly by the Seneca Nation council. In its filing with the FCC, the Seneca Nation noted that it had sustained "long-term losses" operating the station, which had escalated into "financial distress" during the COVID-19 pandemic. The filing requested a suspension of operations, which would allow up to one year for the Seneca Nation to either relaunch or sell the station. WGWE ended programming at 10:09 p.m., with a farewell statement from Russell, a montage of end-themed songs, a final playing of "As Long as the Grass Shall Grow," and ending programming with Van Halen's cover of "Happy Trails."

"Gae:no'" was later picked up for syndication through Native Voice One, and Maybee would also later take over that network's music block (then known as Undercurrents, which aired during evenings during the later years of WGWE; Maybee would dub his block The Mainstream). Locally, Gae:no' and The Mainstream are heard on noncommercial station WRFA-LP. Scott's syndicated program is carried locally by WXMT in Bradford, Pennsylvania. Russell has been employed by St. Bonaventure as a producer for their men's basketball broadcasts since 2023; in 2024, he resumed his position as women's basketball announcer in an agreement with WBRR. The former studios were sold off to a neighboring restaurant; as of 2023, the building serves as an art gallery. Seven Mountains Media established a translator in Salamanca on the nearby 105.5 frequency to simulcast WOLY, its own classic hits station.

On October 17, 2025, Smith organized an on-air reunion with Hill and Garon to celebrate their colleague Mark Thompson's retirement from WPIG.

=== Ownership by Paul Izard ===
In September 2021, the Seneca Nation sold the WGWE license to Paul Izard for $25,000. Izard operates Energy Radio Buffalo, an electronic dance music webcaster. Izard's efforts targeted the Buffalo market 40 miles away; WGWE's signal in theory covered much of the southern portion of the area but faced adjacent-channel interference from a Family Life Network translator in Buffalo on 106.1 and cross-border interference from CHRE-FM in St. Catharines, Ontario, on 105.7, as well as WJZR to the northeast on 105.9, limiting the northern reach of the signal. The sale was consummated on December 23, 2021; WGWE began simulcasting Energy Radio Buffalo on March 2.

The format lasted only six weeks on-air; on April 14, Izard surrendered the WGWE license to the FCC and shut down both the station and the webcast, with the FCC cancelling the station's license four days later. Izard blamed the failure on undisclosed physical problems with the WGWE transmitter that he, having no background in radio engineering, had no knowledge of how to fix, as well as a lease agreement on the WGWE broadcast tower with terms that Izard did not comprehend when agreeing to buy the license. Izard's short-lived tenure as WGWE owner was the subject of a cautionary tale, "How Not to Buy a Radio Station," on the radio trade industry Web site Radio Insight, which documented the opaque and obscure method in which most radio stations are bought and sold in the United States.

=== Sale to Family Life Network and transformation into WCGS ===
On April 29, 2022, Family Life—owner of the 106.1 translator that interfered with WGWE—offered to purchase the WGWE license for $1 and assumption of debts on the condition that Izard request a reversal of his cancellation request. The FCC granted the request and reactivated the license that month. In anticipation of the sale, Izard resumed operating the station on May 30, carrying Memorial Day special programming live from Buffalo. The sale was filed with the FCC in early June, with the sale price increased to a nominal $10. Izard transferred control of WGWE to Family Life on July 15 under a local marketing agreement while officially maintaining ownership until the sale was consummated on September 8, 2022; he has continued to operate Energy Radio Buffalo as an online-only Webcast with all programming intact. On September 15, 2022, the station changed its call letters to WCGS.

Family Life already held, and still holds, a construction permit for WCOI, a station with nearly identical coverage to WCGS on 91.9, which would be licensed to Ellicottville. After purchasing the 105.9 license, Family Life tacitly abandoned efforts to launch that station and reallocated the 91.9 construction permit to another proposed station, WCGB, which would instead be licensed to Franklinville to eliminate the overlap between the two stations, also switching WCGS to a tower slightly further west and reducing that station's broadcast power.
