= WHHO =

Radio station in Hornell, New York (1949–2010)

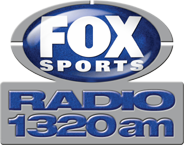
- Hornell, New York; United States
- Broadcast area: Elmira–Corning
- Frequency: 1320 kHz
- Branding: Fox Sports Radio 1320

Programming
- Format: Defunct, was sports talk
- Affiliations: Fox Sports Radio, Citadel Media

Ownership
- Owner: William Berry; Bat Lyons (deceased); (Bilbat Radio, Inc.)

History
- First air date: 1949
- Last air date: January 28, 2010
- Former call signs: WWHG (1949–1968)

Technical information
- Facility ID: 5308
- Class: D
- Power: 5,000 watts day; 22 watts night
- Transmitter coordinates: 42°17′32″N 77°40′27″W

WHHO (1320 AM) was a radio station broadcasting a sports talk format. Licensed to Hornell, New York, United States, the station served the Elmira-Corning area. The station was owned by Bilbat Radio, Inc. (at the time of closure, wholly owned by William Berry after the death of partner Bat Lyons). The station had been the home of Eric Massa's weekly radio broadcasts. Gene Burns, a Hornell native, began his long broadcasting career at the station.

== History ==
In 1946, the W.H. Greenhow Co, owner of the Hornell Evening Tribune, launched WWHG-FM 105.3 as Hornell's first radio station. The call letters WHG are the initials of the company.

WLEA, a competitor owned by Canisteo Radio Corporation, came on the air on 1320 kHz at 1 KW Daytime as part of the post-World War II radio boom in 1946. Shortly after that, WWHG was granted a Conditional Permit and then license to operate on 1590 kHz at 1 KW Day. Faced with direct competition, WLEA went into bankruptcy, with most of the office fixtures and equipment having been sold to Cary Simpson for WFRM in Coudersport, Pennsylvania.

With WLEA 1320 AM now out of the picture, its license was transferred from Canisteo Radio Corporation in December 1950 to the W.H. Greenhow Company, and WWHG vacated its dial position at 1590 and migrated to 1320 kHz, on which frequency the FCC permits higher power. WLEA returned to the air under different ownership months later on 1480 kHz. WWHG then applied for a construction permit in February 1951 to move its transmitter site from Bald Hill Road to Meeks Hill Road, and to move its studios and offices from 99 Main Street to 85 Canisteo Street in Hornell, above the Hornell Evening Tribune offices. In June 1956, The W.H. Greenhow Company sold the station to RA-Tel Broadcasters, Inc. In November of that year, the station was granted permission to increase its power to 5,000 watts, but still retaining its daytime-only status.

The following year, the owner principals in RA-Tel Broadcasters changed, but the company name was retained until August 1968, when the company was renamed Steuben Broadcasters, Inc. In October 1967, the station was granted permission to operate with a pre-sunrise authority power of 500 watts, enabling it to sign on at 6am year-round.

The call sign was changed to WHHO on October 7, 1968.

In July 1970, the station was sold by Steuben Broadcasters to Southeastern Publications, Inc., but Steuben Broadcasters remained the name of the licensee. The following year, studios and offices for the station were moved to 1484 Beech Street in Hornellsville, just outside Hornell.

In December 1974, the station was sold again, this time to Jonas Terman and Donald Hartman, but the Steuben Broadcasters name was still retained. . The licensee and ownership changed one last time on June 10, 1983, to Bilbat Broadcast Bunch, owned by Richard "Bat" Lyons and William Berry. WHHO and WKPQ were sold to Bilbat for $450,000.

The station was caught in an ownership dispute in the late 2000s in which Pembrook Pines Media Group attempted to buy sister station WKPQ in exchange for Pembrook Pines-owned WABH and cash; that deal eventually fell through.

== Decline and failure ==
WHHO ceased operations on January 28, 2010 after the FCC revoked its license for failure to pay a 2007 fine, stemming from alleged failure to air government-mandated statements and not maintaining a "public information file."

Owner William Berry, who made WHHO his own personal project in an attempt to turn it back towards profitability, cited WHHO's poor revenue for not paying the fine.

Incidentally, WHHO is the second Bilbat station to have lost its license; WKZA Kane, Pennsylvania lost its license in 1992, and while another person owned the FCC license, Bilbat still owned the physical assets of the station, which were ultimately destroyed due to weather damage.

Shortly after the station's closure, Fox Sports programming moved to WCBA in Corning; Phoenix Radio arranged to swap WCBA for WKPQ in 2010. WCBA ultimately also lost its license in 2022 after operating sporadically for the previous three years.
