= UATV =

UATV is an acronym representing any of the following:

- Urban America Television, defunct television network in the United States
- United Artists Television, defunct television production and syndication arm of United Artists Pictures
- UATV, Ukrainian public broadcaster, operated by Ukrinform
