= WOEN =

Radio station in Olean, New York

Simulcast of WQRS Salamanca
- Olean, New York; United States
- Broadcast area: The GOAT 96.3-97.1-98.3-98.7
- Frequency: 1360 kHz
- Branding: The G.O.A.T.

Programming
- Format: Classic rock
- Affiliations: Compass Media Networks; United Stations Radio Networks

Ownership
- Owner: Seven Mountains Media; (Southern Belle, LLC)
- Sister stations: WMXO, WQRS, WPIG, WOLY

History
- First air date: 1957 (as WMNS)
- Former call signs: WMNS (1957–2000)
- Call sign meaning: W OlEaN

Technical information
- Licensing authority: FCC
- Facility ID: 19708
- Class: D
- Power: 1,000 watts day 30 watts night
- Transmitter coordinates: 42°06′18″N 78°23′25″W
- Translator: 96.3 W242CT (Olean)

Links
- Public license information: Public file; LMS
- Webcast: Listen live
- Website: goatrockradio.com

WOEN (1360 AM) is a radio station in Olean, New York, United States. The station is owned by Seven Mountains Media.

The station was formerly known as WMNS until ca. 2000 when the station changed to its current calls. For most of the mid-2000s until the end of 2011, WOEN was the Olean affiliate of The Rush Limbaugh Show; that show moved to WVTT in 2012. Among other affiliations the station carried were with ABC Radio Networks' talk network, the CBS Radio Network, the WOR Radio Network, and Talk Radio Network. The station switched to the WGGO simulcast in September 2013 (at the time both carried adult standards/oldies formats); in 2016, both stations flipped to talk, this time with Salem Radio Network providing the content. WOEN continued operating after WGGO was knocked off air in March 2017.

On March 21, 2018, shortly after WGGO returned to air (after a year of test programming it eventually took up the talk lineup and brought Limbaugh back), WOEN flipped from talk to country music, simulcasting WZKZ. The station also began broadcasting on translator W242CT at 96.3 MHz. WOEN was the only AM radio station in Waypoint Media's portfolio that ran a format other than its "The Patriot" conservative talk brand.

In early 2021, Waypoint spun off its New York radio stations to Seven Mountains Media, which had already purchased the other station groups in Olean. WOEN and WZKZ were originally intended to be retained in the sale, but in July, WZKZ was instead donated to Family Life Network. As Seven Mountains already had a country outlet in Olean, the dominant WPIG, WOEN was taken silent, with the station returning to the air in September 2021 by simulcasting its longtime sister station WMXO. The simulcast switched to WQRS on December 1, 2021.
