= WCOP =

WCOP may refer to:

- WCOP (FM), a radio station (103.9 FM) licensed to serve Eldred, Pennsylvania, United States
- WCGH, a radio station (106.1 FM) licensed to serve Farmington Township, Pennsylvania, which held the call sign WCOP from 2009 to 2021
- WWDJ 1150 AM, a radio station in Boston, Massachusetts, United States that previously used the WCOP call sign
- WZLX 100.7 FM, a radio station in Boston, Massachusetts, that previously used the WCOP-FM call sign
