= WPIG =

Radio station in Olean, New York

Coordinates: 42.036°N 78.446°W

- Olean, New York; United States
- Broadcast area: Bradford/Jamestown
- Frequency: 95.7 MHz
- Branding: 95.7 The Big Pig

Programming
- Format: Country music
- Affiliations: Compass Media Networks; United Stations Radio Networks; Buffalo Bills Radio Network

Ownership
- Owner: Seven Mountains Media; (Southern Belle, LLC)
- Sister stations: WMXO, WOEN, WOLY, WQRS

History
- First air date: 1949
- Call sign meaning: Pig

Technical information
- Licensing authority: FCC
- Facility ID: 2864
- Class: B
- ERP: 43,000 watts
- HAAT: 226 meters
- Translators: 99.1 W256BS (Olean); 101.3 W267DF (Wellsville)

Links
- Public license information: Public file; LMS
- Webcast: Listen Live
- Website: wpig.com

WPIG (95.7 FM) is a radio station located in Olean, New York, United States. Branded as "95.7 The Big Pig", the station operates a country music format. It is owned by Seven Mountains Media.

== History ==
The station originally signed on as WHDL-FM in 1949. The FM station was launched to overcome the limited range of WHDL's 1,000-watt local signal, and due to its early establishment, the station was able to lay stake to a much wider broadcast area. In its early years was affiliated, like most upstate New York FMs of the time, with WQXR-FM in New York City; for its first 74 years of existence, the station carried the games of St. Bonaventure Bonnies men's basketball. James F. Hastings, later a U.S. Congressman, ran the station from 1952 to 1966. The call sign was changed from WHDL-FM to WEBF-FM in recognition of station owner E. Boyd Fitzpatrick. During the 1980s, the station aired what today's jockeys pejoratively referred to as an "elevator music" (likely something along the lines of middle-of-the-road, beautiful music or easy listening) format. In September 1988, under new ownership, the station was known as WOLN (not to be confused with FM 91.3, the public radio station that currently uses the callsign) with an adult contemporary format. A year later, on September 29, 1989, the call sign was changed to WPIG. Later, on November 6, mirroring the national trend, the station switched formats to the rapidly burgeoning country music format and became known as "The Big Pig 95.7, Today's Sizzlin' Country." It has held the same slogan, branding, and format ever since, for 30 years as of 2019; it thus has the longest uninterrupted and active run with the same format in the Southwestern New York region.

WPIG operates under the corporate entity Arrow Communications of New York. The company has variously been held by Sabre Communications, then Backyard Broadcasting, and Community Broadcasters, LLC, who purchased the station in 2013; in January 2019, Community Broadcasters sold its Southern Tier stations to Seven Mountains Media.

During the first several years of the country format, WPIG disc jockeys used pseudonyms with pig-based puns, such as: "Smokey' Joe Bacon," "Michael Hamm," "Peggy Banks," "Sue EE Cinamon Frank "Adam Ribbs," and "Christopher Neggs" (the first incarnation of The Morning Pigpen's hosts were thus bacon, ham, 'n'eggs; see also the Froggy brand, which uses similar frog-based pun names). This idea was dropped in the late 1990s as the second generation of disc jockeys would join the station, all of whom used more conventional names. Neggs remained with the station as a weekend personality and fill-in, for most of that time using his real name, Nick Pircio. WPIG announced on January 13, 2024, that Pircio had died following a long illness.

The second generation of hosts remained in their positions for over a decade; from 1998 to 2006 and 2008 to 2009, the station's lineup featured the same lineup of disc jockeys. Mark Thompson, the program director and co-host of the morning show, is the last remaining on-air personality from this era; the other three hosts from this era (Casey Hill, Mike "Smitty" Smith and Jesse Garon, all three of whom have either retired from radio and/or left Western New York) went on to launch WGWE shortly after leaving The Pig. Thompson remained in the morning host position until 2025, when he announced his retirement, an event that was marked by the return of this era's hosts to the WPIG studios, who noted very little had changed under subsequent owners' leadership.

WPIG added the slogan "Today's Fun Country" in 2009, which rotates with the "Sizzlin' Country" format. Also added around this time was the Big Pig Jackpot, a contest in which the station announces the amount of money in a progressive jackpot over the course of the day cold-calls random people in the listening area to test if they listen to the station; a person who either knows the answer (or, by chance, guesses correctly) wins the jackpot. The jackpot was dropped in 2014.

Logo used from 1989 to 2019. The current logo, introduced in 2019, includes the same pig mascot, without his hat, and a more ornate yellow wordmark.

The station tweaked its image in 2013 with its sale to Community Broadcasters, adding 30-minute blocks of "continuous country," dropping national news, auto racing coverage and its Saturday night classic country block, taking over the local chapter of the national Country Showdown competition (which had previously rested with WQRS), and changing its voiceover announcer for the first time since adopting the country format. The station began streaming its programming on the Internet for the first time in its history beginning in 2014.

The station's image was once again tweaked in 2019 following the station's purchase by Seven Mountains Media. The on-air playlist (outside syndicated shows) came to resemble a country version of the adult hits format, airing a gold-based playlist centered around the 1980s, 1990s, 2000s, 2010s, and some current music. For a brief period of time, a handful of country oldies dating as far back as the early 1950s were also included in the mix, although these subsequently have been phased out. Classic performers such as Randy Travis, Mark Chesnutt, Joe Diffie, Alabama, and Clint Black have once again become core artists, mixed in regular rotation with current artists. The station is one of the few country stations in Seven Mountain Media's portfolio not to use the "Bigfoot Country" brand nor share its airstaff with other country stations in the Seven Mountains portfolio; WPIG continues to use the Pig logo, mascot and longstanding air staff out of acknowledgement of the brand's heritage and consistent high listenership in Olean. The station nonetheless saw advertising revenues declining during Seven Mountains ownership, which led to the station dropping its Bonnies affiliation for the first time in its history in 2023. The station has since reverted to a more mainstream country mix of hit singles from the 1990s through today.

== Programming ==
The station uses a programming format similar to the Bigfoot Country and Froggy stations in Seven Mountains' portfolio, with local programming in daytime and drive time, and syndication in the evening. The internally syndicated "Nancy and Newman," based at WFVY, have served as morning hosts since 2025, which had ended the 36-year run of WPIG's morning brand "The Morning Pigpen." "Lunch Lady Katie" MacLean hosts midday, including the all-request lunch hour, another feature since the Pig brand's launch. Jimmy the Mick, a local jock, hosts afternoon drive. The nationally syndicated Taste of Country Nights is carried evenings.

WPIG is the Cattaraugus County broadcast affiliate for the Buffalo Bills Radio Network.

=== Special programming ===
- WPIG rebrands as "95 Poinsettia" and airs A WPIG Country Christmas, an automated selection of country-themed Christmas music, throughout Christmas Eve through Christmas Day. Between the Friday after Thanksgiving and Christmas Eve, the station generally plays one Christmas song each hour. (Beginning in 2013, the Christmas selections were broadened to include more traditional Christmas songs from the adult standards format in addition to country Christmas covers.)

=== Notable alumni ===
- Mike "Smitty" Smith, midday and afternoon drive host (ca. 2000–2009). Retired from broadcasting in 2016; later served four years as Mayor of Salamanca, New York.
- Jesse Garon, evening radio personality (1998–2010). Currently the midday host on 107.3 WSJY in the Madison, Wisconsin market.
- Bethany, co-host of the Morning Pigpen and mid-day host. Currently the morning show co-host at WPOC in Baltimore

== Audience ==
WPIG's 92,000 watts of power allows the station to boom its signal through most of the western Southern Tier, stretching from Jamestown to Springville over most of Allegany County, and into much of McKean County, Pennsylvania. Its tower is located on the cluster of mountains south of Olean that includes Mount Hermanns and Hartzfelt Mountain, shared with public radio station WOLN.

The station regularly registers by far the top Arbitron ratings in the Olean market. The most recent ratings, from spring 2021, showed the station having a share more than five times the nearest competitor for whom ratings are made public, before Nielsen stopped monitoring the Olean market in the early 2020s.

== Other uses ==
- An entirely fictional "WPIG" radio station made several appearances on the CBS sitcom WKRP in Cincinnati, where it was the hated cross-town rival of the eponymous station. The punchline was that the air staff at WPIG Cincinnati was "a bunch of swine." This usage predates the current WPIG's usage of the call sign.
- A different fictional "WPIG" − WPIG Aurora − appeared in the 1993 motion picture Wayne's World 2. The station featured two memorable characters in the form of "Handsome Dan" and "Mr. Scream," portrayed by Harry Shearer and Ted McGinley, respectively. (Incidentally, the real WPIG, which had begun broadcasting its current format by this time, and the fictional WPIG Aurora both broadcast on 95.7 MHz, a departure from the usual practice of using nonstandard frequencies for fiction.)
- See also KPIG.
