= Great Valley, New York =

- Town
- Location within the state of New York
- Coordinates: 42°11′41″N 78°38′53″W
- Country: United States
- State: New York
- County: Cattaraugus

Government
  - Type: Town Council
  - Town Supervisor: Daniel J. Brown (D, R)
  - Town Council: Members' List: • Ted LaCroix (D, R); • Lori L. Finch (R); • Ann Rockwell (R); • Daniel R. Smith (R)

Area
  - Total: 50.22 sq mi (130.08 km^{2})
  - Land: 50.12 sq mi (129.81 km^{2})
  - Water: 0.10 sq mi (0.27 km^{2})
- Elevation: 1,460 ft (450 m)

Population (2020)
  - Total: 1,991
  - Estimate (2022): 1,969
  - Density: 39.7/sq mi (15.33/km^{2})
- Time zone: UTC-5 (Eastern (EST))
  - Summer (DST): UTC-4 (EDT)
- ZIP Codes: 14741 (Great Valley); 14748 (Kill Buck); 14779 (Salamanca); 14731 Ellicottville)
- Area code: 716
- FIPS code: 36-009-30257
- GNIS feature ID: 0979015
- Website: www.greatvalleyny.org

Great Valley is a town in Cattaraugus County, New York, United States. The population was 1,991 at the 2020 census. The town is named after its local geographical setting, a relative comparison of two tributaries (the other being the neighboring Little Valley) of the Allegheny River.

The town of Great Valley is centrally located in the county, northeast of the city of Salamanca.

== History ==
The town's area was first settled circa 1812, with the first settlement, Kill Buck, coalescing in 1818. The Town of Great Valley was incorporated in 1818, taken from part of the town of Olean. In 1831, the town of Burton was made from the southeast part of Great Valley, and in 1842 the town of Carrollton was made from the southwest part of Great Valley.

== Geography ==
According to the United States Census Bureau, the town has a total area of 50.2 square miles (130.1 km^{2}), of which 50.1 square miles (129.8 km^{2}) is land and 0.1 square miles (0.3 km^{2}), or 0.20%, is water.

The Allegheny River flows through the southeast corner of the town, and Great Valley Creek is an important stream in the town.

U.S. Route 219 is a major north–south highway in the town and intersects New York State Route 98 in Great Valley village.

=== Adjacent towns and areas ===
Great Valley is south of the town of Ellicottville and north of the town of Carrollton. The west boundary is formed by the towns of Salamanca and Little Valley, as well as the city of Salamanca and the Allegany Reservation. Great Valley's east boundary is formed with the towns of Humphrey and Allegany. A very small part of southwestern Great Valley borders the town of Red House.

== Demographics ==
Historical population
Census	Pop.	Note	%±
1820	271		—
1830	647		138.7%
1840	852		31.7%
1850	1,638		92.3%
1860	1,525		−6.9%
1870	1,641		7.6%
1880	1,859		13.3%
1890	1,705		−8.3%
1900	1,497		−12.2%
1910	1,775		18.6%
1920	1,336		−24.7%
1930	1,366		2.2%
1940	1,215		−11.1%
1950	1,375		13.2%
1960	1,408		2.4%
1970	1,745		23.9%
1980	2,014		15.4%
1990	2,090		3.8%
2000	2,145		2.6%
2010	1,974		−8.0%
2020	1,997		1.2%
2022 (est.)	1,969		−1.4%
U.S. Decennial Census

As of the census of 2000, there were 2,145 people, 843 households, and 596 families residing in the town. The population density was 42.8 inhabitants per square mile (16.5/km^{2}). There were 1,196 housing units at an average density of 23.8 per square mile (9.2/km^{2}). The racial makeup of the town was 96.36% White, 0.79% African American, 1.17% Native American, 0.70% Asian, 0.47% from other races, and 0.51% from two or more races. Hispanic or Latino of any race were 0.93% of the population.

There were 843 households, out of which 30.0% had children under the age of 18 living with them, 58.8% were married couples living together, 7.4% had a female householder with no husband present, and 29.2% were non-families. 24.0% of all households were made up of individuals, and 8.3% had someone living alone who was 65 years of age or older. The average household size was 2.52 and the average family size was 2.98.

In the town, the population was spread out, with 25.0% under the age of 18, 6.4% from 18 to 24, 26.9% from 25 to 44, 27.2% from 45 to 64, and 14.5% who were 65 years of age or older. The median age was 41 years. For every 100 females, there were 109.7 males. For every 100 females age 18 and over, there were 103.7 males.

The median income for a household in the town was $37,784, and the median income for a family was $42,209. Males had a median income of $31,581 versus $21,792 for females. The per capita income for the town was $17,749. About 3.1% of families and 6.7% of the population were below the poverty line, including 4.9% of those under age 18 and 6.3% of those age 65 or over.

== Notable people ==
- DeHart H. Ames, former New York state senator
- Chauncey J. Fox, former New York state senator
- Nelson I. Norton, former US congressman

== Communities and locations in Great Valley ==
- Allegany Reservation – Part of the Iroquois reservation is in the southwest corner of the town.
- Allegany State Park – A small section of the park is in the southwest corner of the town.
- Great Valley – the hamlet of Great Valley is centrally located in the town. The town is at the convergence of County Roads 18 and 38, NY-98, as well as US 219. Great Valley Creek flows southward through the community.
- Great Valley Airport (N56) - A general aviation airstrip with a turf runway (Runway 6-24, length 3800 feet), operated by and adjacent to Katy's Fly-In Restaurant (formerly Eddy's). It is about one mile southwest of the hamlet of Great Valley.
- Great Valley Creek – A stream that flows into the town at the north town line and out the southeast corner of the town to join the Allegheny River in Salamanca, New York.
- Holiday Valley Resort – A ski resort that straddles the town's northern border with Ellicottville.
- Kill Buck – A hamlet east of Salamanca on Route 219, named after a chief of a local tribe.
- Peth – A hamlet southwest of Great Valley village on US Route 219, at the terminus of County Route 67.
- Rock City and McCarty Hill State Forests – A sprawling state forest, covering the northwestern corner of Great Valley and covering portions of several surrounding towns.
- Salamanca – A small part of the city of Salamanca overlaps the southwest corner of the town.
- Sugartown – A hamlet northeast of Great Valley village, near the east town line on NY Route 98.
- Willoughby – A hamlet east of Great Valley village on County Road 18.

The seasonal theme park Pumpkinville is in the neighboring town of Humphrey but carries a Great Valley mailing address.

== Transportation ==
Great Valley Airport is located one nautical mile (1.85 km) southeast of the central business district of Great Valley.

The Buffalo and Pittsburgh Railroad runs a line through Great Valley, paralleling Route 219. It is used almost exclusively for freight; no passenger service is available on the line.

== Education ==
Public school students mostly attend Ellicottville Central School, which contrary to its name is located in the northern part of the Town of Great Valley. A public school operated in Great Valley until the early 1970s; much of the lot on which the now-demolished building once stood remains vacant (part has been used for a post office), and the street serving the school (School Street) has since been removed, with only a sidewalk remaining.

== Religion ==
Two churches, one an independent Methodist church (formerly part of the Church of the United Brethren in Christ and Evangelical United Brethren Church before 1968 and United Methodist Church before 2022) and one a Baptist church, are located next to each other in the hamlet of Great Valley. An additional United Methodist Church in Sugartown, also previously an EUB church before its merger with the UMC, operated until 1981 before merging with its nearby counterpart. Healing Reigns Fellowship is located in Kill Buck.

Also in Great Valley is the nondenominational Little White Church, which was built in 2007 and has only once (at its dedication) been used for a church service, instead serving primarily as a wedding venue and roadside attraction.
