= Ray Evans Seneca Theater =

Stage theater in New York, United States

Coordinates: 42°9′19.05″N 78°42′57.55″W

The Ray Evans Seneca Theater is a stage theater located in the city of Salamanca, New York at the corner of Broad Street (New York State Route 417) and Main Street in the center of the city. The theater is named after Ray Evans, a songwriter who was born and raised in Salamanca.

== History ==
The theatre was originally called the Seneca Theatre and built by the Schine Chain to replace an aging venue a couple of blocks up the street. The building was designed by John and Drew Eberson. Construction was started in 1941 just before the outbreak of World War II. Because of a shortage of building materials caused by the war, construction was not completed until 1945 after the war ended.

The theatre was called the Seneca after the Indian nation which owns the underlying ground. The entire city of Salamanca is located on the Seneca Indian reservation. The land is ground-leased from the Senecas and everyone in the town pays an annual rent to the Seneca Nation.

The theater lobby originally featured many sculptures in crevices on the walls. It was operated by the Schine Chain until 1965. The theater continued to show movies until June 1972 when the auditorium ended up under eight feet of water in the flooding which accompanied Hurricane Agnes (exacerbated by the recently built Kinzua Dam). The Theater originally had 1272 seats.

The Seneca sat abandoned until the early 1980s when Cattaraugus County acquired the building. Over the next several years the theatre was slowly renovated and transformed into Cattaraugus County Living Arts Association (CCLAA), also known as the Cattaraugus County Center For the Performing Arts.

The theater shut down in 2011 due to the building's electrical system falling into disrepair and a lack of funding to repair it. Stage events were moved to the Salamanca High School auditorium and to the Seneca Allegany Events Center on the west side of the city in the interim. The CCLAA remained active and maintained the theater's marquee as a billboard, seeking to use revenues from the marquee rentals as well as rentals from other CCLAA properties to renovate the theater back into usable condition.

The theater was re-opened in November 2013 with an announcement that films could once again be played in the theater through the use of a temporary film screen. The first film in the reopened Seneca Theater would be The Lemon Drop Kid, for which Evans and Jay Livingston wrote the score; When Harry Met Sally... followed in February 2014. Most of the films shown at the theater in its current incarnation are films that have recently been released on DVD. Live theater productions resumed in 2014.

== Current status ==
Most of the performances at the theater are amateur community theatre productions run by the CCLAA itself, with two full-scale productions each year (one in winter and the other in summer); an annual Christmas variety show is a regular part of the theater's schedule.
