= WXZY-LP =

- Kane, Pennsylvania; United States
- Frequency: 101.7 MHz

Programming
- Format: Community radio

Ownership
- Owner: Kane Area Radio Association

History
- First air date: August 14, 2014

Technical information
- Licensing authority: FCC
- Facility ID: 193116
- Class: L1
- ERP: 4 watts
- HAAT: 92 meters (302 ft)
- Transmitter coordinates: 41°39′34.62″N 78°48′42.24″W

Links
- Public license information: LMS
- Website: wxzyradio.com

WXZY-LP (101.7 FM) is a community focused non-profit radio station in Kane, Pennsylvania, licensed by the FCC as a low-power FM (LPFM) and operating as a community radio station with a freeform format. Local coverage includes local events, news, and sports. The station also broadcasts a wide variety of music, with specialty programming every weekend. Weather forecasts are provided by WJET-TV. The station is an affiliate of the weekly syndicated Pink Floyd program "Floydian Slip."

== History ==
This station received its original construction permit from the Federal Communications Commission on January 15, 2014. The new station was assigned the WXZY-LP call sign by the FCC on January 29, 2014. The station received its license to cover from the FCC on August 14, 2014.

WXZY-LP marks the return of FCC-licensed, locally originated radio to Kane after two previous commercial stations no longer broadcast there. AM 960 WQLE (the former WKZA), the first station in Kane, ceased broadcasting in 1992, while what is now WCOP (the former WLMI) moved to another town in the early 2010s. From its inception in 2014 until 2018, WXZY operated out of WLMI's former studios at 97 Fraley Street in Kane. In 2018, WXZY purchased the radio tower directly behind the studio and erected a new building at its base, that would serve as their new studio. Public broadcaster WPSX and religious broadcaster Family Life Network (the latter of which owns WCOP) both have repeaters in the borough that do not originate any programs from Kane.
