= Chuck Crist =

American football player (1951–2020)

No. 24, 44
- Position: Safety

Personal information
- Born: January 16, 1951; Salamanca, New York, U.S.
- Died: October 28, 2020 (aged 69); Cleveland, Ohio, U.S.
- Listed height: 6 ft 2 in (1.88 m)
- Listed weight: 205 lb (93 kg)

Career information
- College: Penn State
- NFL draft: 1972: undrafted

Career history
- New York Giants (1972–1974); New Orleans Saints (1975–1977); San Francisco 49ers (1978)

Career NFL statistics
- Interceptions: 20
- Fumble recoveries: 11
- Sacks: 4
- Stats at Pro Football Reference

Charles Thomas Crist (January 16, 1951 – October 28, 2020) was an American professional football safety in the National Football League for the New York Giants, New Orleans Saints, and the San Francisco 49ers. Unusually for an NFL player, Crist never played college football.

A star quarterback and defensive back in high school football and a standout on the basketball court as well in Salamanca, New York (Crist ranks second overall in Salamanca High School basketball scoring with 1,004 points, behind only Jack O'Rourke), Crist received an athletic scholarship to Penn State University. Believing himself to be capable of playing quarterback at a high level, he insisted on playing that position if he were to play football, but Penn State coach Joe Paterno insisted he play defensive back. Rebuffing Paterno's request, Crist instead used his scholarship to play college basketball, where he played four years for the Nittany Lions. Crist's reputation as a defensive back was nevertheless still high enough even after not playing college football that the Giants signed him as an undrafted free agent upon graduating in 1972. This time, he agreed to play defensive back, where he spent all seven years of his professional career, never playing quarterback again.

After retiring from professional football, he served as a high school principal and elementary school principal in the Salamanca School District. Crist spent over four years on paid leave, facing undisclosed accusations, beginning November 2009; he was exonerated February 2014. Crist announced his retirement from school administration effective January 29, 2015, citing health problems. Prior to returning to Salamanca, Crist had also dabbled in assistant coaching with Cattaraugus Central School from 1983 to 1985, and with the Alfred Saxons football team from 1985 to 1991.

Crist died October 28, 2020. He was one of at least 345 NFL players to be diagnosed after death with chronic traumatic encephalopathy (CTE), which is caused by repeated hits to the head.
