= WCOP (FM) =

- Eldred, Pennsylvania; United States
- Broadcast area: Bradford, Pennsylvania
- Frequency: 103.9 MHz

Programming
- Format: Contemporary Christian
- Affiliations: Family Life Network

Ownership
- Owner: Family Life Network; (Family Life Ministries, Inc.)

History
- First air date: December 22, 1981 (as WRXZ)
- Former call signs: WRXZ (1981–1985); WIFI (1985–1988); WLMI (1988–2010); WUMT (2010–2011); WVTT (2011); WBYB (2011–2017); WAGL (2017–2019); WVTT (2019); WCGH (2019–2021)
- Call sign meaning: "Where Christ Offers Peace"

Technical information
- Licensing authority: FCC
- Facility ID: 4586
- Class: A
- ERP: 1,200 watts
- HAAT: 224.7 meters (737 ft)
- Transmitter coordinates: 41°48′36″N 78°23′10″W

Links
- Public license information: Public file; LMS
- Website: familylife.org/radio

WCOP (103.9 MHz) is a commercial FM radio station, licensed to Eldred, Pennsylvania. It is an owned-and-operated station in the Family Life Network, a regional Christian broadcaster.

== History ==
=== McKean County's first FM ===
What would eventually become WCOP began at a time when Kane, Pennsylvania, the station's original city of license, was experiencing a sharp decline in its local economy. Originally assigned the call letters WRXZ and going on the air December 22, 1981, 103.9 came on the air at a time of extensive expansion of the FM radio band; the FCC's Docket 80-90 resulted in a boom of new FM stations in suburban and rural locations through the 1980s.

WRXZ was founded by Huber-Dixon Broadcasting, with T.R. Dixon serving as president, and Clarence V. Huber, Jr. as general manager.

WRXZ would be competing for advertising revenue with a well-established AM competitor, WKZA, that had been on the air since 1954, and had been controlled for many years by a New York-based company (the Bilbat Broadcast Bunch dba locally as Raise Kane Radio, Inc.) that had other stations in its portfolio in addition to its own.

The call letters were changed to WIFI about two years after going on the air, and it didn't take long for WIFI to make an impact on its competitor, though not enough to effectively put it out of business until years later. WIFI was the very first FM station to come on the air in McKean County, with WBRR in Bradford coming on the air three years later.

WHKS in Port Allegany and WQRM in Smethport would not come on the air until six and seven years later, respectively. Though only 3,000 watts at the time of its debut, Kane was located at the top of a mountain, which allowed WIFI a huge coverage area from a relatively short antenna, thus enabling it to serve all of McKean County and parts of New York's Twin Tiers area, as well as a portion of Elk and Warren Counties.

=== The fall of WKZA and rise of WLMI ===
Even with FM emerging as the primary broadcast technology and WIFI providing local radio service following WKZA's sunset shutdown mandated by the FCC at the time, WKZA continued to maintain its position as the predominant local radio provider. However, by 1987, WIFI faced financial depletion, leading to the station going off the air until a suitable buyer could be secured.

Industrialist Dennis Heindl of Ridgway, Pennsylvania, purchased the station for $105,000 in January 1988 from Mountain Forest Communications. The station was renovated, re-equipped, and reassigned the call letters WLMI, for Laurel Media, Inc. (His manufacturing company was Laurel Manufacturing Inc.)

Heindl returned the station to the air in April 1988. In 1989, Heindl sold WLMI and a construction permit for an unbuilt station in Reynoldsville, Pennsylvania (assigned the calls WDDH then, now known today as WDSN), to William Hearst, president of Clarion County Broadcasting. As WLMI began to entrench itself as a formidable competitor in town, many of WKZA's staff defected to WLMI, leaving Raise Kane Radio to put WKZA up for sale, finding that its profits were rapidly shrinking. Though a competitor buyout was speculated, WLMI did not show an interest in acquiring an AM station, and WKZA was sold for $75,000 to Bill Shannon Broadcasting in 1990.

The following year meant transactions for both WKZA and WLMI. Bill Shannon Broadcasting sold WKZA to Walter R. Pierre for $63,500 in December 1991, with the FCC approving the transaction a month later. On December 3, 1992, Hearst sold WLMI for $245,000 to Beech Tree Broadcasting Co, whose president was veteran news broadcaster Chuck Crouse, who had anchored news reports for many years on WEEI in Boston. (Clarion County Broadcasting acquired WKQW and WKQW-FM in Oil City in 2005).

With Crouse's background in news, it wasn't uncommon to hear a local newscast each hour of every day on WLMI during this time, following an hourly report from ABC News. Crouse anchored news reports from 6 am until 2 pm with Scott McGuire handling reports from 3 pm until the following morning, Monday through Friday. High school students from Kane and the surrounding area were hired to provide information to listeners on weekends, helping to keep WLMI's doors open seven days a week. Crouse's first hire in 1993 was Michael Hinman, then a student at nearby Johnsonburg Area High School who would later become the founder of Airlock Alpha and the creator of the SyFy brand name. He is now editor of The Riverdale Press in Bronx, New York.

Weather was also a staple on the station with around 50 reports a day each hour and half-hour. Crouse hosted a daily two-hour morning show each weekday called "The Chuckwagon" which featured music, commentary, interviews and occasional announcements about lost dogs. Sports Director and Sales Manager at the time, Barry Morgan, hosted a sports commentary at 9:10 a.m. each weekday that ran for about 10 minutes. On Saturdays, local programming included a three-hour extended edition of Crouse's show known as "Saturday Morning Open-House" from 9 am until noon. Hinman hosted a weekly high school sports roundup called "Sunday Fifth Quarter" that lasted until he graduated from high school in 1994. Around 1999, WLMI developed a website that still provides news and information today while under new ownership. This very successful attempt at localism (while using a satellite-delivered programming service for music and DJs) would eventually seal WKZA's fate.

WKZA became WQLE in an effort by Pierre to reverse its sagging fortunes. The station, which by this time was reduced to an all-barter affiliate of Chuck Harder's "For the People" populist national talk network (which shared its revenues with affiliate stations), finally failed for good, going dark on December 21, 1992. Its departure left WLMI as the only local radio station offering service to Kane. No FCC paperwork was filed to legally silence the station, and was given up as simply abandoned.

Today, the WKZA calls belong to an oldies station at 106.9 mHz, serving Warren and Jamestown, New York.

In July 2006, Crouse sold WLMI to Colonial Radio Group and CEO Jeff Andrulonis, for $366,000.

Since its formative years as WIFI, WLMI had maintained its longtime call letters and a format that combined full-service news & information with country music. Under Colonial Radio Group's ownership, the station switched from an ABC Radio Networks satellite service (Today's Best Country) to a mostly locally programmed contemporary country music format. The station also offered ABC News Radio and local news, Paul Harvey, The Lia Show, sports play-by-play, and a locally produced polka show on Sundays.

In July 2007, the station received approval from the FCC for a move of its tower for an increase of coverage area in McKean & Elk Counties. The tower move was completed on October 29, 2007.

Beginning November 2007, WLMI operated KaneRadio.net, an Internet-only all-news radio station. The station ran an assortment of national news from ABC News Radio, Fox News Radio, local news, business reports, and sports on a tape loop. On nights and weekends, KaneRadio.net ran a relay of ESPN Radio. A full launch was expected in December 2007, with programming from BBC World Service and late-night and entertainment features from Westwood One later added to the schedule.. As of November 2008, kaneradio.net was no longer in operation and the domain expired.

WLMI began broadcasting in HD Radio in 2008. At launch, WLMI's HD channels were broadcasting WLMI's main feed and two ABC Radio 24-hour networks, The Christmas Channel and Timeless. It later broadcast WLMI's main feed and an alternate feed of WXMT, WLMI's sister station in Smethport.

WLMI's ownership bought WQRM (106.3/99.3, now WXMT) in Smethport/Bradford from the Allegheny Mountain Radio Network and a 94.3 translator from the Family Life Network in 2008. WLMI was using these acquisitions to build a network covering much of McKean County. A separate 95.3 transmitter in Smethport is currently relaying WLMI but, according to the company, is expected to change to a satellite talk radio format, affiliated with Talk Radio Network. The launch date for the new "FM Talk Radio 95.3" has not been announced. WLMI also owns the former WFRM-FM (96.7, now WBYB), currently licensed to Portville, New York with a separately programmed country format. For a time in 2009, WLMI simulcasted WBYB, with the morning show coming from WLMI and the midday and afternoon shows programmed from WBYB.

Ironically, one of WLMI's biggest competitors was St. Marys-based WDDH, which is owned by WLMI's former owner, Laurel Media. WDDH also runs a country format. Other competitors include Olean-based WPIG and Warren-based WKNB.

=== The end of country, the debut of "The Summit" ===
In 2010, WLMI separated from WBYB (with whom it had been sharing programming), returned to its satellite country format from Citadel (though the morning show remained) and changed its call sign to WUMT. On June 14, 2010, WUMT changed its format to a classic rock/classic hits/adult album alternative hybrid format, branded as "The Summit," formatted similarly to sister station WXMT ("The Mountain"). The move marked the end of country music on the station for the first time in nearly thirty years.

=== Talk radio era ===
On February 15, 2011, WUMT changed its call letters to WVTT in preparation for a change to talk radio. Colonial had previously announced plans to launch a talk radio station on W237CS but never followed through with the permit. Local morning and evening shows were planned, with the Glenn Beck Program and Dennis Miller carried during the midday and Fox Sports Radio on overnights.

The station also announced plans to be carried on an FM translator on 99.1 MHz. Currently, this translator is licensed to Rock City with very low power on 99.3 MHz.

On October 19, 2011, WBYB assumed the call signs of FM 96.7 in Portville, New York, and began simulcasting that station's talk radio format. The country format was retained on Colonial's numerous digital subchannels and two small translators, 99.1 in Olean and 95.3 (W237CS) in Smethport. 2012 saw the return of Allegany-Limestone athletics on the 99.1 translator, with Mike Ruether as sportscaster; 95.3 carried Smethport High School athletics. Ruether and the Allegany-Limestone sports broadcasts eventually moved to WOEN and WGGO.

Casey Hill, WBYB's lone local host, remained on staff for both stations until leaving for WGWE in the summer of 2012.

Programming prior to 2012 included a local show hosted by Hill and Michael Baldwin, the Glenn Beck Program, Dennis Miller, The Dave Ramsey Show, The Savage Nation, Alex Jones, and The Phil Hendrie Show. WVTT and WBYB joined Premiere Radio Networks' talk network in 2012, resulting in an overhaul of the station's lineup: joining the lineup were The Rush Limbaugh Show, The Sean Hannity Show, America Now with Andy Dean, and Coast to Coast AM. Ramsey was moved to evenings, Jones cut to an hour on overnights, while Miller and Savage were dropped (Miller ended up on WOEN). The local newscast remained until April 29, 2013, after which point it was replaced with the syndicated The War Room with Quinn and Rose and all local news operations were shuttered.

=== Return to country music and move to Eldred ===
WBYB closed its local studio in Kane in 2012. In January 2013, a minor change application was filed with the FCC to move WBYB's community of license from Kane, Pennsylvania to Eldred, Pennsylvania. The application was approved, and a Construction Permit issued, on May 16, 2013. Colonial Media & Entertainment owner Jeff Andrulonis cited high municipal taxes and a stagnant local economy as the reason for moving WBYB out of Kane. (The station would be replaced in Kane with WXZY-LP, which operates as a low-power nonprofit station out of WLMI/WBYB's former studios.)

On June 4, 2013, WBYB's antenna and transmission equipment were moved to their new location on Prospect Hill, outside of Smethport; WBYB now shares this location with its sister station, WXMT. It immediately began carrying Colonial's "Big Bob Country" format. The station underwent a shift in branding to "Hometown Country, Bob 103-9," returning to a similar branding and logo to what WLMI had carried in Kane. WBYB will primarily target listeners in Pennsylvania and does not intend to, at least directly, compete with the New York State-based country station WPIG.

WBYB acquired the broadcast rights to NASCAR broadcasts from the Motor Racing Network and Performance Racing Network beginning in the 2014 season. Those rights had previously sat with WPIG for over two decades. WBYB planned to cross-promote the NASCAR coverage at Bradford Speedway, which like WBYB was owned by Colonial until the company shut the speedway down in June 2014.

The move to Eldred was finalized when the station's new license to cover was issued on March 27, 2014. The station currently lags behind other stations in the Olean market in terms of ratings, with a 1 share (compared to the 3 share of sister station WXMT and the 17 share of WPIG).

Logo as "The Eagle"

In November 2015, the station flipped to Christmas music. When the station returned to regular programming in January 2016, it had merged with its classic country brand ("Eagle 99.1"), retaining the Bob FM brand, and had shifted to a mainstream/traditional country mix with both new and classic songs in its mix.

On July 4, 2017, the station dropped the Bob FM brand and revived the name "The Eagle," correspondingly changing its call sign to WAGL. Programming on the station did not change. The classic country was spun back off to its own channel in March 2018.

=== Failed sale to Rick Freeman and sale to Family Life Network ===
On April 24, 2018, Colonial announced it had sold the station, along with WXMT and WVTT-FM, to Rick Freeman in a deal involving cash and cryptocurrency. Freeman was to take over the stations on May 1.

By December 2018, Freeman had backed out of the sale agreement. Colonial then announced it would sell the 103.9 license (but not the WAGL call signs or intellectual property, which will move down the dial to 96.7) and a translator on 104.9, to Family Life Network to convert the station to its contemporary Christian music format. The WAGL calls moved down the dial to 96.7 in March 2019, with 103.9 temporarily taking on the WVTT-FM calls until the sale closed.

FLN closed on the sale April 3, 2019 and filed a construction permit with the FCC to make the station's signal directional, pointed to the southeast in part to protect adjacent-channel WHTT-FM in Buffalo, New York. (This would point the signal away from Olean, but FLN already has a translator there operating on 101.1.) On April 15, 2019, in consistency with other Family Life stations (which use call signs starting with WCI, WCO and WCG), the station changed its call sign to WCGH; the station had begun simulcasting Family Life by this point. On June 16, 2021, the call sign was changed to WCOP, in a swap with Family Life's Farmington Township station.
