= Kill Buck, New York =

Kill Buck, New York Joʼsgwä:dase:h
- Hamlet
- Location within New York Location within the United States
- Coordinates: 42°09′30″N 78°40′51″W
- Country: United States
- State: New York
- County: Cattaraugus
- Elevation: 1,407 ft (429 m)
- Time zone: UTC-5 (Eastern (EST))
  - Summer (DST): UTC-4 (EDT)
- ZIP code: 14748
- Area code: 716
- GNIS feature ID: 954603

Kill Buck (Seneca: Joʼsgwä:dase:h, literally: "it goes around stone") is a hamlet in Cattaraugus County, New York, United States. The community is located along New York State Route 417 and U.S. Route 219 Business, sharing its western border with the eastern border of the city of Salamanca. Kill Buck is named after Daniel Kill Buck (or, by another source, Dave Kill Buck), who was a mayor of the community during its days as a Seneca village.

Kill Buck is roughly evenly divided, with the northern half of the hamlet within the jurisdiction of the town of Great Valley and the southern half within the bounds of the Allegany Indian Reservation; Routes 219 and 417 roughly demarcate the dividing line. The town of Great Valley maintains a separate fire hall and public park facilities for Kill Buck.

Kill Buck has an estimated population of 650 according to the Rand McNally 2021 atlas.

== History ==
Kill Buck was once a sprawling Seneca community, extending to cover much of what is now the southeast corner of the city of Salamanca before the city was incorporated in 1913. It was alternately spelled "Killbuck," but a late 20th-century controversy over the spelling eventually settled upon spelling it as two separate words. It was established in 1818.

Kill Buck has a post office with ZIP code 14748, which opened on December 28, 1837. On July 1, 1992, the post office relocated to an office at the post office in Salamanca after the building in Kill Buck it was sharing, a general store, abruptly closed. (The proprietor of the store and Kill Buck postmaster since 1975, Bill Costello, had also overseen the closure of the post office in nearby Red House, New York—also inside a Costello-owned store—in the 1960s.) The Postal Service has returned to Kill Buck in a standalone building.

The hamlet's public school closed in 1971.
