= WKPQ =

Radio station in Hornell, New York

- Hornell, New York; United States
- Frequency: 105.3 MHz
- Branding: Froggy 105.3

Programming
- Format: Country
- Affiliations: Compass Media Networks

Ownership
- Owner: Seven Mountains Media; (Southern Belle, LLC)
- Sister stations: WZHD

History
- First air date: 1946 (as WWHG)
- Former call signs: WWHG (1946–1981); WHHO-FM (1981–1983)

Technical information
- Licensing authority: FCC
- Facility ID: 5309
- Class: B
- ERP: 43,000 watts
- HAAT: 162 meters
- Transmitter coordinates: 42°17′32″N 77°40′27″W

Links
- Public license information: Public file; LMS
- Webcast: Listen live
- Website: lovemyfroggy.com

WKPQ (105.3 FM) is a radio station broadcasting a country music format. Licensed to Hornell, New York, United States, the station serves the Elmira–Corning area including the Canisteo valley and northern Pennsylvania. The station is currently owned by Seven Mountains Media.

== History ==
The station signed on in 1946 as WWHG-FM, owned by the W.H. Greenhow Co who also owned the Hornell Tribune newspaper. In the era of AM radio, it did not do well financially, so the mission became to procure an AM signal. In 1949, WWHG began operation on 1590 with 500 Watts. Very shortly thereafter, WLEA 1320 kHz went into bankruptcy and discontinued operations. A Pennsylvania radio station operator, Cary Simpson, purchased the equipment, most of which was used to sign on WFRM Coudersport, PA. The license was purchased by WWHG, moving WWHG to 1320 and turning in the 1590 License. WLEA returned a year later under different ownership on 1480 kHz, where it is today. WWHG AM-FM later became WHHO AM-FM, eventually bought by Bilbat Radio in 1983. Renamed WKPQ, 105.3 began an adult contemporary format; WHHO an MOR/variety format as before.

In the 1990s, the ownership became in flux as Bilbat sold the stations to two different entities, the Pfuntner group (Pembrook Pines Media Group) and Backyard Broadcasting. Backyard soon retreated but Bilbat's legal battle continued with Pembrook continued. Bilbat partner Richard C. Lyons (Bat) died in 2005 and eventually remaining partner Bill Berry was required to settle with Pembrook. In the meantime, Pembrook had their own problems. The poor economy coupled with some poor decisions put Pembrook into a financial position unable to complete the Bilbat Sale, so Berry shut down WHHO and sold WKPQ to Sound Communications in 2011 (Vision would buy much of the rest of Pembrook in 2014). Sound, in turn, intended to sell all its broadcast assets to Standard Media in late 2019, though this was eventually abandoned and Seven Mountains Media eventually bought the station instead.

=== Country music ===
On October 10, 2011, WKPQ changed its format to country, branded as "Kickin' Country 105.3".

In July 2021, WKPQ rebranded as "Bigfoot Country", simulcasting WCBF 96.1 FM Elmira.

On August 24, 2023, WKPQ split from its simulcast with WCBF and rebranded as "Froggy 105.3". The Froggy brand was originally introduced by Kerby Confer, the father of Seven Mountains owner Kristin Cantrell; the rebranding of WKPQ as Froggy came as part of Cantrell's agreement to purchase several of her father's stations.
