= That Thing with Rich Appel =

Weekly three-hour radio program

- That Thing with Rich Appel logo as of 2022
- Genre: Syndicated Classic Hits/Oldies music show
- Running time: 3 hrs. (including station breaks)
- Country of origin: United States
- Hosted by: Rich Appel
- Created by: Rich Appel
- Original release: 2014
- Website: https://www.thatthingshow.com/

"That Thing with Rich Appel" is a weekly three-hour radio program covering classic hits and oldies music, hosted by Billboard and Inside Radio writer, AccuRadio programmer/station curator and disc jockey Rich Appel, barter-syndicated to commercial FM and AM stations in the United States through Global Media Services, Inc. As of January 2022, it is aired weekends on over 100 stations across North America, Europe, Asia and Oceania, both terrestrial and internet broadcast.

"That Thing" is intended to be a re-creation of the sound of the top 40 radio format during the 1960s, 70s and 80s, including the format's quick pace, typically personality-centered, with spoken introductions to most songs over the "intro" up to the vocals. The show's stated purpose is to bring back "the classic top-down top 40 sound," with jingles produced to sound as if they were from those years, and commercials which aired on radio or television during that era.

Most songs heard on a typical “That Thing" are chosen to match up with the birthdays of celebrities, birthdates of historical figures, historical events or holidays on - or having taken place on - each weekend's Saturday or Sunday air dates. Regular features of “That Thing" include “the world's shortest countdown,” “the slow-dance make-out song of the week” and the occasional song from “the rack in the back of the shack."

The show's second hour is usually theme-driven, with recurring features such as: “What’s Going On,” where listeners are asked to guess the common theme of songs played; "A Year/A Summer/A Holiday Season In An Hour," featuring songs from one particular year, summer or December; or unusual themes for certain holidays or birthdays, such as songs matched to cookie fortunes on "Fortune Cookie Day," or songs featuring unusual instruments on "Uncommon Musical Instruments Day."

Annual special features on “That Thing” include: January’s “Tele-lection,” where listeners are asked to vote for their favorite television show themes, counted down during a special Hour 2 the first weekend of February; annual "Class Reunion” specials in May and June, featuring the hits and sounds of each graduating class' freshman, sophomore, junior and senior years; the listener-voted “WOW! 100” countdown airing in early spring, and “all summer songs, all summer long."

The show is said to take place in 'The Chestnut Cabaret' and listeners are fondly referred to as "Appleheads."
