= James F. Hastings =

American politician

James Hastings
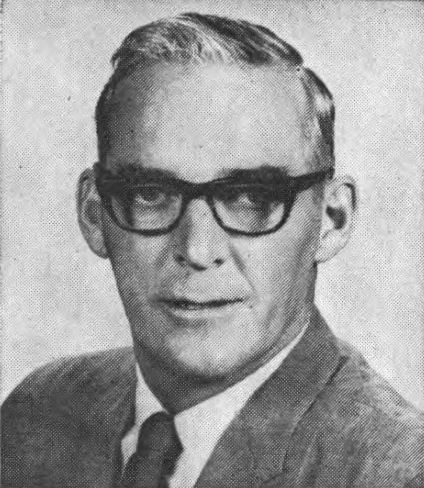

Member of the U.S. House of Representatives from New York
- In office January 3, 1969 – January 20, 1976
- Preceded by: Charles Goodell
- Succeeded by: Stan Lundine
- Constituency: 38th district (1969–1973); 39th district (1973–1976)

Member of the New York Senate
- In office January 1, 1966 – December 31, 1968
- Preceded by: Constituency established
- Succeeded by: Jess J. Present
- Constituency: 65th district (1966); 57th district (1967–68)

Member of the New York State Assembly from the Cattaraugus County district
- In office January 1, 1963 – December 31, 1965
- Preceded by: Jeremiah J. Moriarty
- Succeeded by: Constituency abolished

Personal details
- Born: James Fred Hastings; April 10, 1926 Olean, New York, U.S.
- Died: October 24, 2014 (aged 88) Allegany, New York, U.S.
- Party: Republican
- Spouse(s): Barbara Gaylor; Kathleen Smith

Military service
- Allegiance: United States
- Branch/service: United States Navy
- Years of service: 1943–1946
- Battles/wars: World War II

James Fred Hastings (April 10, 1926 – October 24, 2014) was an American radio station executive and a Republican politician who represented New York in the United States House of Representatives from 1969 to 1976.

== Early life ==
Hastings was born on April 10, 1926, in Olean, New York. He graduated from Allegany Central School in 1943, and joined the United States Navy for World War II. After he returned home in 1946 he worked as a carpenter, and then worked as a sales representative for Procter & Gamble.

Hastings later became active in several businesses, including manager and vice president of radio station WHDL from 1952-1966, national advertising manager for the Times Herald newspaper in Olean from 1964-1966, and a partner in the real estate and insurance firm of Hastings & Jewell.

He was a member of the Allegany Town Board from 1953 to 1962, and was the town's police court justice for five years.

== Political career ==
Hastings was a member the New York State Assembly (Cattaraugus Co.) from 1963 to 1965, sitting in the 174th and 175th New York State Legislatures; and a member of the New York State Senate from 1966 to 1968, sitting in the 176th and 177th New York State Legislatures. He was a delegate to the 1968 and 1972 Republican National Conventions.

He was elected as a Republican to the 91st, 92nd, 93rd and 94th United States Congresses, holding office from January 3, 1969, to January 20, 1976, when he resigned to become the president of the Associated Industries trade group in Albany, New York.

Later in 1976, Hastings was indicted for taking kickbacks from three employees while he was a legislator, and using the money to purchase vehicles, snowmobiles, and boats as well as contributing to his children's college tuition and a New York state retirement fund. He was convicted of mail fraud and filing false payroll information in December 1976 and served 14 months in the United States Penitentiary, Allenwood.

== Later life ==
After his release from prison, Hastings lived in retirement in Belleair Beach, Florida until returning to Allegany in 1998.

== Death ==
He died on October 24, 2014, in Allegany, New York.

== See also ==
- List of American federal politicians convicted of crimes
- List of federal political scandals in the United States

== Sources ==
- United States Congress. "James F. Hastings (id: H000327)". Biographical Directory of the United States Congress.

New York State Assembly
Preceded by Jeremiah J. Moriarty	Member of the New York Assembly from the Cattaraugus County district 1963–1965	Constituency abolished
New York State Senate
New constituency	Member of the New York Senate from the 65th district 1966	Constituency abolished
Preceded by Thomas Laverne	Member of the New York Senate from the 57th district 1967–1968	Succeeded by Jess J. Present
U.S. House of Representatives
Preceded by Charles Goodell	Member of the U.S. House of Representatives from New York's 38th congressional district 1969–1973	Succeeded by Jack Kemp
Preceded by Jack Kemp	Member of the U.S. House of Representatives from New York's 39th congressional district 1973–1976	Succeeded by Stan Lundine
