= WMXO =

Radio station in Olean, New York

- Olean, New York; United States
- Frequency: 101.5 MHz
- Branding: POP! 101.1-101.5 FM

Programming
- Format: Adult contemporary
- Affiliations: Compass Media Networks; Premiere Networks

Ownership
- Owner: Seven Mountains Media; (Southern Belle, LLC)
- Sister stations: WOEN, WQRS, WPIG, WOLY

History
- First air date: November 1, 1978 (as WBJZ)
- Former call signs: WBJZ (1978–1990)
- Call sign meaning: W MiX Olean (previous branding)

Technical information
- Licensing authority: FCC
- Facility ID: 19710
- Class: A
- ERP: 4,000 watts
- HAAT: 123 meters (404 ft)
- Transmitter coordinates: 42°6′18.2″N 78°23′24.1″W
- Translator: 101.1 W266BN (Olean)

Links
- Public license information: Public file; LMS
- Webcast: Listen Live
- Website: popradio101.com

WMXO (101.5 FM) is a radio station in Olean, New York, United States. The station broadcasts with an adult contemporary format. The station is currently owned by Seven Mountains Media.

== History ==
WMXO has been broadcasting since November 1, 1978. It has held its current call sign and format since 1990.

From September 2012 to December 2013, WMXO shifted to contemporary hit radio.

Effective September 10, 2014, Sound Communications, LLC purchased WMXO and three sister stations out of bankruptcy for $275,000. A sale to Standard Media was slated to close in early 2020. The sale collapsed and the station was instead sold to Seven Mountains Media, which had also bought the other two major commercial radio clusters in Cattaraugus County, effective June 1, 2021.

On December 10, 2021 Seven Mountains Media fired WMXO's airstaff and flipped the station to Christmas music, branded as "Christmas Radio 101.1/101.5" with the addition of translator W266BN 101.1 FM Olean; a rebrand, similar to what sister station WQRS underwent the previous month, was expected to be unveiled after the stunt ends. On December 27, 2021. WMXO unveiled the new brand, "POP! 101.1-101.5 FM", based on Townsquare Media's PopCrush brand. The station (unlike WQRS, WPIG and WOLY, all of which are programmed in Olean largely using WPIG's longstanding airstaff) is programmed from DuBois, Pennsylvania sister stations WQQP and WPQP.
