= WQRS =

Radio station in Salamanca, New York

- Salamanca, New York; United States
- Broadcast area: Olean, New York
- Frequency: 98.3 MHz
- Branding: The GOAT 96.3-97.1-98.3-98.7

Programming
- Format: Classic rock
- Affiliations: Compass Media Networks; United Stations Radio Networks

Ownership
- Owner: Seven Mountains Media; (Southern Belle, LLC)
- Sister stations: WMXO, WOEN, WPIG, WOLY

History
- First air date: October 15, 1988 (as WQRT)
- Former call signs: WQRT (1988–2006)
- Call sign meaning: We're Q Rock Salamanca

Technical information
- Licensing authority: FCC
- Facility ID: 9408
- Class: A
- ERP: 3,200 watts
- HAAT: 135 meters (443 ft)
- Transmitter coordinates: 42°06′32″N 78°36′28″W
- Translator: 98.7 W254BQ (Limestone)
- Repeaters: 97.1 WZHD (Canaseraga); 360 WOEN (Olean)

Links
- Public license information: Public file; LMS
- Webcast: Listen live
- Website: goatrockradio.com

WQRS (98.3 FM) is a radio station licensed to Salamanca, New York serving the Olean, New York broadcasting area. The station airs a classic rock format and is owned by Seven Mountains Media, the leading commercial broadcaster in Cattaraugus County. Its transmitter is based in Carrollton.

== History ==
The station signed on October 15, 1988 as WQRT with the slogan "Great 98 Country." Although it was part of the late 1980s boom in rural and suburban FM stations that boosted country music, WQRT followed an approach similar to older country outlets blending modern and traditional classic country. Serving the Salamanca, Bradford, and Olean markets, WQRT became the top rated station due to the limited number of country stations. In 1989, 95.7 WPIG in Olean switched from its old adult-contemporary/easy listening format to country, contrasting WQRT's classic style with a more modern "hot-country" focus. This allowed WQRT to maintain its niche for several years. During this era, WQRT was owned by Gary Livingston.

In the late 1990s, the station rebranded as 98 Rocks, under the ownership of Michael Washington until 2006, when Washington sold the station to Pembrook Pines Media Group.

WQRS primarily broadcast programming from Dial Global's "Classic Rock" (and before that, The Classic Rock Experience from ABC) and also carried the syndicated Nights with Alice Cooper program.

In September 2010, WQRS quietly ended its classic rock format and switched to an all-satellite country music format, simulcasting WZKZ in Alfred.

On October 2, 2013, WQRS reverted to its classic rock format and revived the "98 Rocks" brand. The current format is locally originated, automated and features a broader, album-oriented playlist. In late September 2014, Sound Communication acquired WQRS. In 2021, Seven Mountains Media purchased WQRS and other Sound Communications System.

On November 29, 2021, WQRS rebranded as "The G.O.A.T." and added a simulcast on sister station WOEN 1360 AM. Its airstaff consists of syndicated programming and jockeys from other Seven Mountains stations in Olean.

The WQRS call sign was previously heard on a classical music FM station in Detroit, Michigan.
