= Salamanca, New York =

Salamanca Dejonyöwe:gwa:ön or Onë́’dagö:h
- City
- City of Salamanca
- Location in the state of New York
- Coordinates: 42°9′31″N 78°42′57″W
- Country: United States
- State: New York
- County: Cattaraugus
- Reservation: Allegany
- Named for: José de Salamanca

Government
  - Type: Council-Manager
  - Mayor: Sandra Magiera (D)
  - City Council: Members' List: • W1: John "Jack" Hill (D); • W2: Kylee Johnson (D); • W3: Barry Smith (R); • W4: Mike Reed (D); • W5: Janet L. Koch (D)

Area
  - Total: 6.24 sq mi (16.15 km^{2})
  - Land: 5.99 sq mi (15.52 km^{2})
  - Water: 0.24 sq mi (0.63 km^{2})
- Elevation: 1,381 ft (421 m)

Population (2020)
  - Total: 5,929
  - Density: 989.2/sq mi (381.93/km^{2})
- Time zone: UTC-5 (Eastern (EST))
  - Summer (DST): UTC-4 (EDT)
- ZIP code: 14779
- Area code: 716
- FIPS code: 36–009–64749
- GNIS feature ID: 0964291
- Website: www.salamancany.gov

Salamanca (Seneca: Dejonyöwe:gwa:ön or Onë́’dagö:h) is a city in Cattaraugus County, New York, United States, inside the Allegany Indian Reservation, one of two governed by the Seneca Nation of Indians. The population was 5,929 at the 2020 census. It was named after José de Salamanca, a Spanish nobleman and cabinet minister of the mid-19th century. Salamanca invested in railroads around the globe, including the Atlantic and Great Western Railroad in New York State, Pennsylvania, and Ohio.

== Geography ==
According to the United States Census Bureau, the city has an area of 6.24 square miles (16.15 km^{2}), of which 5.99 square miles (15.52 km^{2}) is land and 0.24 square miles (0.63 km^{2}), or 3.88%, is water.

Salamanca is within the Allegany Indian Reservation of the Seneca Nation of Indians (one of the six tribes of the Haudenosaunee Confederacy). The city population of about 5,900 is about 19% Native American; this does not include Seneca people living in the nearby hamlets of Jimerson Town (one of the two capitals of the nation) and Kill Buck. The city lies along the Allegheny River and is adjacent to Allegany State Park.

Salamanca is one of two cities in Cattaraugus County, the other being Olean.

== Climate ==
Climate data for Salamanca, New York
| Month | Jan | Feb | Mar | Apr | May | Jun | Jul | Aug | Sep | Oct | Nov | Dec | Year |
|---|---|---|---|---|---|---|---|---|---|---|---|---|---|
| Record high °F (°C) | 72 (22) | 68 (20) | 80 (27) | 89 (32) | 90 (32) | 94 (34) | 97 (36) | 94 (34) | 97 (36) | 87 (31) | 81 (27) | 70 (21) | 97 (36) |
| Mean daily maximum °F (°C) | 30 (−1) | 33 (1) | 42 (6) | 55 (13) | 66 (19) | 75 (24) | 78 (26) | 76 (24) | 69 (21) | 58 (14) | 46 (8) | 34 (1) | 55 (13) |
| Mean daily minimum °F (°C) | 14 (−10) | 15 (−9) | 21 (−6) | 32 (0) | 41 (5) | 51 (11) | 55 (13) | 54 (12) | 47 (8) | 37 (3) | 30 (−1) | 20 (−7) | 35 (2) |
| Record low °F (°C) | −25 (−32) | −25 (−32) | −18 (−28) | 7 (−14) | 19 (−7) | 24 (−4) | 25 (−4) | 31 (−1) | 20 (−7) | 13 (−11) | −4 (−20) | −22 (−30) | −25 (−32) |
| Average precipitation inches (mm) | 3.08 (78) | 2.46 (62) | 2.86 (73) | 3.63 (92) | 3.85 (98) | 4.92 (125) | 4.68 (119) | 3.96 (101) | 4.11 (104) | 3.72 (94) | 3.94 (100) | 3.55 (90) | 44.76 (1,137) |
Source: The Weather Channel

== History ==
What is now known as the city of Salamanca was originally two separate communities, one on Little Valley Creek and the other on Great Valley Creek; the westernmost one of the two was called "Hemlock", a name derived from the numerous hemlock trees throughout the surrounding mountains. The eastern community (from modern-day Conrath Avenue eastward) was Kill Buck; the eastern half of what is now Kill Buck remains an unincorporated hamlet independent of the city of Salamanca. Hemlock was later renamed "West Salamanca" and (although it was marked on road signs as late as the 1990s) was eventually incorporated into the single city of Salamanca. The city was incorporated in 1913.

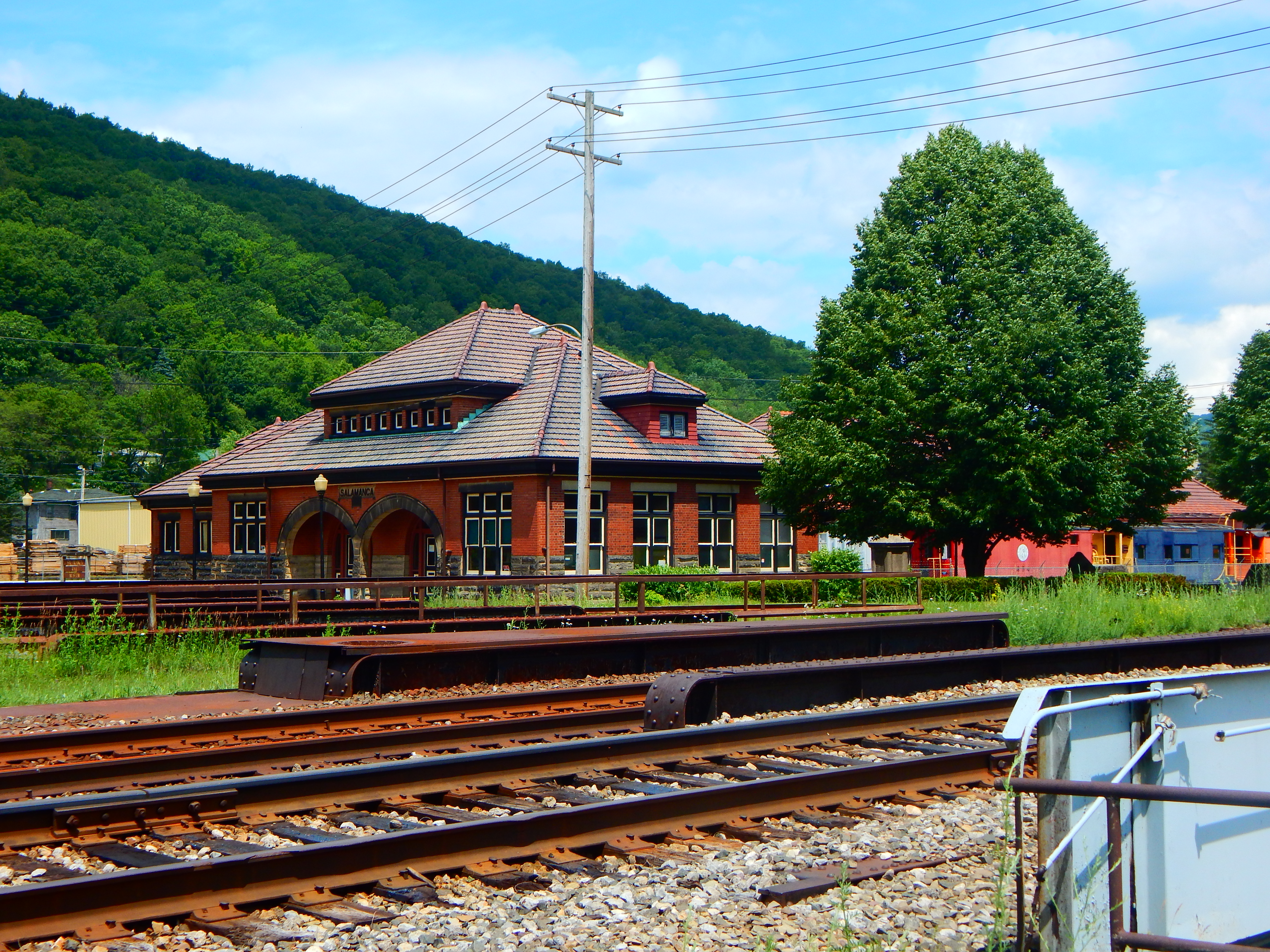
Salamanca station, now the Salamanca Rail Museum

At one time the city was a thriving railroad hub, with the Erie Railroad (later Conrail), Buffalo, Rochester and Pittsburgh Railway (BR&P) (later Baltimore and Ohio Railroad) both having facilities there. Generations of Salamanca residents worked for the railroads, and much of the housing was originally built for them by the railroads. The city also benefited from the then-thriving lumber industry that dominated much of southwestern Cattaraugus County at the turn of the century, as boomtowns along the Allegheny River such as Elko, South Valley and Red House (all much-less populated ghost towns today) all used the railroads to ship their goods upstream. At the time of the city's incorporation, it peaked at under 10,000 residents, not far behind Olean, 19 miles to the east, the major hub of the county; Olean, however, would continue to grow rapidly into the 1950s, while Salamanca's population would begin falling behind almost immediately. The Salamanca Rail Museum was opened in the former BR&P depot in 1984 to house its archives.

The majority of the city, with the exception of a northeastern spur along Great Valley Creek, was constructed on the Allegany Indian Reservation held by the Seneca Nation of Indians, as established in various treaties. Under the nation's policy, non-Seneca residents are barred from owning real property on the reservation, and non-Senecas can only lease the property from the Seneca Nation. As arranged by the railroads, the previous leases had nominal payments and covered only the land; improvements (i.e., buildings and houses) were considered to be owned by the non-native citizens.

When the leases expired in the early 1990s, the nation tried to gain more from its leases, raising their costs and asserting not only the land, but the improvements were also subject to the native leases. Numerous people living in the city did not agree on the amount of lease payments or the legitimacy of the Senecas' absolute ownership claim. The controversy aroused bitterness, lawsuits, and appeals to government officials. Congress passed a law explicitly placing the improvements under Seneca jurisdiction, the new leases were put into effect, and fifteen houses were seized and their owners evicted for refusing to sign the leases. The current leases are in effect until 2030, with an option to extend until 2070; proceeds from the lease payments are distributed quarterly to enrolled Seneca Nation members, providing a basic income guarantee.

Despite the lack of ownership, leased land held by non-Senecas is subject to property tax, which the lessee must pay to the city, Cattaraugus County and the Salamanca City Central School District. Seneca-owned land is exempt under the Treaty of Buffalo Creek. Once a Seneca acquires the land, it is taken off the tax rolls; for this reason, the city of Salamanca does not auction-off abandoned properties on the reservation in a property-tax auction, for fear Seneca individuals will buy the land, removing it from the tax rolls.

== Government ==
The city has a council-mayor system, with the mayor elected at-large and five trustees selected from wards, generally numbered from west to east.

"Between 2004-05 and 2009-10, State aid for the City, including casino revenues, increased by an average annual rate of nearly 50 percent (starting at $0.8 million in 2004-05 and peaking at $7.3 million in 2008-09). Salamanca's average annual expenditure increases on debt service, general government, transportation, utilities and public safety between 2004-05 and 2009-10 were all in the double digits." This was attributable to revenues from the Seneca Allegany Casino.

=== Casino revenues ===
The Seneca Nation opened a gambling casino in Salamanca in May 2004. About 1,000 new jobs were created by the casino operation, resulting in a housing shortage in the small town as new workers entered the city. Under the arrangement with the state, a 25% share of the casino's revenue goes to the city and county, which they can use for needed projects. Revenues for the city increased dramatically (see above).

Significant change did not quickly take place in the city, with new construction in only a few select areas. Main Street and US Route 219 (which runs through the city) remain largely untouched. Redevelopment was delayed when the Nation stopped casino payments in late 2010, in a dispute with the state over its opening racinos elsewhere in the state; payments were resumed in 2013. The state provided the city with emergency funds to help support it until the dispute was settled. The Senecas again announced it would halt payments to the state in 2017, stating that a clause in the gaming compact had expired and its obligation to continue paying the state was no longer in effect. The Seneca Nation and the state of New York agreed to a settlement in January 2022, with the Senecas agreeing to pay the money owed, ahead of negotiations for a renewal of the compact in 2023.

Because of the contentious relations between Seneca and non-Seneca residents, columnist Selena Zito described Salamanca as a "failed American city" in 2011, in a column that soon drew the rebuke of city officials.

== Economy ==
Retail shops include several Seneca-owned cigarette, tobacco, coffee shops, and gas stations; there are several empty storefronts, especially in the city's central business district on and near Main Street. The Seneca Nation has made efforts to diversify, establishing a tribal holding company in 2009 and an economic development corporation in 2011. In 2021, many of the city's vacant buildings and former smoke shops were converted into cannabis dispensaries, leading to a glut of retailers for the recently legalized product.

The city's only shopping mall, Salamanca Mall, hosts a regional hardware chain, a local antique shop, and a small taqueria called "Rock'n Taco". Three hotels operate in the city.

A number of industrial factories, among them McHone Industries (a metal fabricating company) and Salamanca Lumber, operate in the center part of the city.

== Education ==
The Salamanca school district educates 1,440 students, 427 between pre-kindergarten and 3rd grade, 399 between the 4th and 7th grades, and 477 between 8th through 12th. In July 2026, the school district faced criticism after announcing the implementation of an AI based robotic teacher. Part of the controversy was prompted by the manufacturer Realbotix, due to its ownership of Abyss Creation, manufacturer of the RealDoll brand of sex dolls. Realbotix states that "no employees, technology, or facilities" are shared between their education division and RealDoll.

== Transportation ==
=== Ground ===
The Southern Tier Expressway (Interstate 86 and New York State Route 17) passes south of the city. Running through the city are U.S. Route 219 and New York State Routes 417 and 353, the last two of which terminate within a mile of each other on Salamanca's west end.

Salamanca serves as a hub for the area's public bus service. Coach USA, Fullington Trailways, the Seneca Transit System, and the Olean Area Transit System all converge on the city. The city's only active (freight) rail depot is on the east side of the city, serviced by the Buffalo and Pittsburgh Railroad.

In the past, the Erie Railroad and then, starting in 1960, the Erie Lackawanna Railway had operated passenger trains through Salamanca. Into the 1960s, the Erie Limited and the Atlantic Express/Pacific Express made stops there. The last passenger train making stops there was the Lake Cities which was discontinued on January 6, 1970. The New York and Lake Erie Railroad operated between Salamanca and Gowanda until 1990. Today, the station houses the Salamanca Rail Museum. Two miles to the east, the Buffalo, Rochester and Pittsburgh Railway had an "East Salamanca" station. The successor railroad, the Baltimore and Ohio Railroad last had passenger trains at the latter in the mid-1950s. Into the early 1940s, the Pennsylvania Railroad ran passenger trains into a third station for trains between Olean and Oil City, Pennsylvania.

Two of the former rail rights-of-way are now rail trails: the NY&LE right-of-way is now the state-owned Pat McGee Trail (which officially ends at the city line before entering the city) and the Pennsylvania Railroad path is now the Pennsy Trail. The Finger Lakes Trail also cuts across the city, mainly using city roads.

=== Air ===
Salamanca has no local major airports. Although Great Valley Airport is nearby, this airport is mostly used for general aviation, and no commercial passenger service operates out of it. The nearest public airports are Buffalo Niagara International Airport and Bradford Regional Airport.

== Religion ==
The Catholic Church, Southern Baptist Convention (House of Prayer), Seventh-day Adventists, Free Methodist Church, and Lighthouse Baptist Church all have branches in the city bounds. At least two other independent churches also operate; the local United Methodist Church disaffiliated in the late 2010s.

== Media ==
Radio stations WQRS (on the FM band at 98.3) and WGGO (on the AM band at 1590) are licensed to Salamanca. WQRS (The Goat, historically known as 98 Rocks) carries a classic rock format run by Seven Mountains Media out of Olean; WGGO is an owned and operated station of The Station of the Cross, a regional Catholic radio network, with its nominal studio in Kill Buck. W288EK (FM 105.5) is also licensed to Salamanca and simulcasts WOLY (Big Oly), another Seven Mountains station out of Olean.

From 2010 to 2021, WGWE (FM 105.9) was operated out of Salamanca. The station, licensed to Little Valley, shut down and sold its assets to a broadcaster who plans to operate the station elsewhere.

The Salamanca Press is the local newspaper. A daily paper (publishing Monday through Saturday) for most of the 20th century, the paper reverted to a weekly publication in 2009.

There is no direct television broadcasting in Salamanca; the city is ostensibly part of the Buffalo media market, and local cable and satellite providers carry those stations (as well as some from Erie, Pennsylvania and Toronto, Ontario), but the hilly terrain around the city makes television reception problematic. Two low-powered stations based in Olean can occasionally be received over the air. Breezeline is the local cable provider.

== Demographics ==
Historical population
| Census | Pop. | Note | %± |
|---|---|---|---|
| 1880 | 2,531 | | — |
| 1890 | 3,692 | | 45.9% |
| 1900 | 4,251 | | 15.1% |
| 1910 | 5,792 | | 36.3% |
| 1920 | 9,276 | | 60.2% |
| 1930 | 9,577 | | 3.2% |
| 1940 | 9,011 | | −5.9% |
| 1950 | 8,861 | | −1.7% |
| 1960 | 8,480 | | −4.3% |
| 1970 | 7,877 | | −7.1% |
| 1980 | 6,890 | | −12.5% |
| 1990 | 6,566 | | −4.7% |
| 2000 | 6,097 | | −7.1% |
| 2010 | 5,815 | | −4.6% |
| 2020 | 5,929 | | 2.0% |
U.S. Decennial Census 2020

Salamanca city, New York – Racial composition
| Race (NH = Non-Hispanic) | 2020 | 2010 | 2000 | 1990 | 1980 |
|---|---|---|---|---|---|
| White alone (NH) | 64.5% (3,823) | 75.5% (4,388) | 83.9% (5,114) | 91.5% (6,005) | 96.2% (6,626) |
| Black alone (NH) | 1% (59) | 0.7% (43) | 0.6% (37) | 0.3% (20) | 0.1% (6) |
| American Indian alone (NH) | 20.1% (1,193) | 16.4% (953) | 11.7% (713) | 7.3% (482) | 3.5% (240) |
| Asian alone (NH) | 0.4% (21) | 0.5% (27) | 0.3% (16) | 0.4% (23) | 0% (0) |
| Pacific Islander alone (NH) | 0% (0) | 0.1% (4) | 0.1% (5) | | |
| Other race alone (NH) | 0.2% (12) | 0% (2) | 0% (0) | 0% (0) | 0% (0) |
| Multiracial (NH) | 9.8% (580) | 3.5% (204) | 1.7% (101) | — | — |
| Hispanic/Latino (any race) | 4.1% (241) | 3.3% (194) | 1.8% (111) | 0.5% (36) | 0.3% (18) |

As of the 2020 United States census, Salamanca had a population of 5,929. The ethnic and racial makeup of the population was 69.3% White, 2.6% African-American, 18.6% Native American, 0.7% Asian, <0.1% Pacific Islander, 6.7% reporting two or more races, and 6.7% Hispanic or Latino of any race. 66.3% of the population was non-Hispanic white.

The most reported detailed ancestries in 2020 were:

- Seneca Nation of Indians (17.5%)
- Irish (17.3%)
- German (16.6%)
- English (14%)
- Polish (6.9%)
- Italian (5.4%)
- Puerto Rican (2.5%)
- Scottish (1.9%)
- Swedish (1.6%)
- African American (1.6%)

As of the census of 2000, there were 6,097 people, 2,469 households, and 1,575 families residing in the city. The population density was 1,015.6 inhabitants per square mile (392.1/km^{2}). There were 2,749 housing units at an average density of 457.9 units per square mile (176.8 units/km^{2}). The racial makeup of the city was 74.26% White, 0.66% Black or African American, 20.74% Native American, 0.33% Asian, 0.08% Pacific Islander, 0.18% from other races, and 1.75% from two or more races. Hispanic or Latino of any race were 1.82% of the population.

There were 2,469 households, out of which 31.6% had children under the age of 18 living with them, 42.2% were married couples living together, 15.6% had a female householder with no husband present, and 36.2% were non-families. 31.8% of all households were made up of individuals, and 15.3% had someone living alone who was 65 years of age or older. The average household size was 2.41 and the average family size was 3.00.

In the city, the population was spread out, with 27.0% under the age of 18, 8.0% from 18 to 24, 26.9% from 25 to 44, 20.7% from 45 to 64, and 17.4% who were 65 years of age or older. The median age was 37 years. For every 100 females, there were 88.6 males. For every 100 females age 18 and over, there were 86.6 males.

The median income for a household in the city was $24,579, and the median income for a family was $30,996. Males had a median income of $25,549 versus $19,180 for females. The per capita income for the city was $12,812. About 18.0% of families and 22.2% of the population were below the poverty line, including 32.7% of those under age 18 and 15.9% of those age 65 or over.

== Notable people ==
- George Abbott (1887–1995), theater producer
- Ray Caldwell (1888–1967), former MLB spitball pitcher
- Gordon Canfield (1898–1972), member of the House of Representatives for New Jersey's 8th congressional district
- Chuck Crist (1951–2020), former National Football League safety; he returned to his hometown to serve as a principal in the city schools
- Robert DeLaurentis (1966-), an American aviator, the first solo pilot to fly a Piper Malibu Mirage, a small, single-engine plane, around the world
- Maxine Crouse Dowler (1933–2015), teacher, Member of the Board of Seneca Nation Educational Foundation
- W. Dennis Duggan (1949- ) Justice of the New York Supreme and Family Courts, 1994–2014.
- Ray Evans (1915–2007), musician/songwriter; composed the Christmas song "Silver Bells". The Ray Evans Seneca Theater is named in his honor; it was closed in 2011 due to disrepair and would not reopen until 2013.
- Albert T. "Ab" Fancher (1859–1930), New York state senator in the late 19th/early 20th century; co-owner (with E.B. Vreeland of the Seneca Oil Company, a subsidiary of Standard Oil Company); donated much of the land to New York that now comprises Allegany State Park, the largest state park in New York; developed the Fancher farm, on the western side of Salamanca, which boasts one of the largest barns in New York.
- Ira Joe Fisher (1947-), daytime television personality and weather reporter; born and worked in Salamanca, he spent most of his childhood in neighboring Little Valley.
- Ralph W. Gallagher (1881–1952), president and chairman of Standard Oil of New Jersey
- Marvin Hubbard (1945–2015), former pro football player; born in Salamanca, he spent most of his childhood in nearby Red House
- Michael K. Lee (1973-), theater actor and singer who resides in Seoul, South Korea. Notable productions include Miss Saigon, Jesus Christ Superstar, and Rent.
- Paul Owens (1924–2003) player, scout, coach and general manager with the Philadelphia Phillies in the late 20th century. Raised in Salamanca's East End; graduated from local schools and St. Bonaventure University, and began his baseball career with the still-extant Salamanca Merchants amateur team.
- Edward B. Vreeland (1856–1936), banker, congressman, co-author of the "Aldrich-Vreeland Bill" that transformed the United States Banking system in the early 20th century. Senator Aldrich represented Rhode Island and was the maternal grandfather of Nelson Aldrich Rockefeller, governor of New York in the 1960s.
- Carson Waterman, Seneca Indian artist known for public art and illustrations in the Allegany Seneca Storybook and Seneca Coloring Book.

== Sources ==
- Hogan, Thomas E, "City in a Quandary: Salamanca and the Allegany Leases", New York History 55 [January 1974]
