= Urban America Television =

Former United States television network

- Type: Broadcast television network
- Country: United States

Ownership
- Owner: Urban Television Network Corporation

History
- Launched: December 3, 2001; 23 years ago
- Closed: May 1, 2006; 19 years ago

Urban America Television (UATV) was an over-the-air television broadcast network in the United States targeted towards Black Americans. According to the company's website, the network had 70 affiliate stations. UATV claimed to have had a reach of 22 million households in the United States. It was a successor to the earlier American Independent Television network and began broadcasting December 3, 2001. Created and developed by Fred Hutton (among others) the early programming featured independent produced programs, along with 1930s and 1940s public domain race films.

The company was the only minority-certified television network with the National Minority Supplier Development Council.

== Programming ==
The network aired some original programming, along with films and older sitcoms and dramas. Some programming was also syndicated in markets without UATV stations, but most of its affiliate base was in densely populated metropolitan areas.

== Ceasing of operations ==
According to its filings with the Securities and Exchange Commission, Urban America Television experienced liquidity needs which severely hampered its ability to continue operations, and eventually lost the ability to pay for satellite and uplinking services, along with master control at the network level, effectively curbing the network's operations any further.

As a result, on May 1, 2006, Urban America Television suspended all operations indefinitely, eventually hoping to return if refinancing allowed it to return to the air, though this never occurred.

In response to UATV's unexpected termination, many affiliates were forced to find alternative sources of programming. Competing networks such as America One and religious 3ABN benefited from the failure of UATV, and stations such as WUHQ-LP in Grand Rapids, Michigan and WONS-LP in Olean, New York, simply changed to other minor networks. The digital age and the rise of subchannel networks with a much higher quality selection of programming and on-air production, including Bounce TV, also did in the majority of pre-digital minor networks, a fate likely to have befallen UATV even if survived into the digital age.

== See also ==
- List of United States over-the-air television networks
