= Great Valley Airport =

- IATA: none; ICAO: none; FAA LID: N56

Summary
- Airport type: Public
- Owner: Marilyn Eddy Siperek
- Serves: Great Valley, New York
- Elevation AMSL: 1,450 ft (440 m)
- Coordinates: 42°12′18″N 078°38′50″W
- Interactive map of Great Valley Airport

Runways
Direction	Length		Surface
Direction	ft	m	Surface
6/24	3,800	1,158	Turf

Statistics (2007)
- Aircraft operations: 7,570
- Source: FAA and NYSDOT

Great Valley Airport (FAA LID: N56) is a privately owned, public-use airport located one nautical mile (1.85 km) southeast of the central business district of Great Valley, a town in Cattaraugus County, New York, United States.

== Facilities and aircraft ==
Great Valley Airport covers an area of 26 acres (11 ha) at an elevation of 1,450 feet (442 m) above mean sea level. It has one runway designated 6/24 with a turf surface measuring 3,800 by 60 feet (1,158 x 18 m). For the 12-month period ending October 21, 2007, the airport had 7,570 aircraft operations, an average of 20 per day: 97% general aviation and 3% military.

== See also ==
- List of airports in New York
