= WOLY (Michigan) =

Radio station in Battle Creek, Michigan, 1963–2009

- Battle Creek, Michigan; United States
- Frequency: 1500 kHz

Programming
- Format: Defunct

Ownership
- Owner: Christian Family Network

History
- First air date: November 22, 1963
- Former call signs: WVOC, WWKQ, WCLS

Technical information
- Class: D
- Power: 1,000 watts (Daytime)

WOLY (1500 AM) was a radio station broadcasting a religious format. Licensed to Battle Creek, Michigan, United States, the station was owned by the Christian Family Network. The station was on the air without a license from 2004 to 2009.

== Recent history ==
In 2004, WOLY's last license was set to expire on October 1 of that year; however, the station failed to file the proper paperwork by the due date, which was June 1, 2004—according to Federal Communications Commission regulations, renewals for broadcast licenses are due four months prior to the current license's expiration. According to the FCC, the station's owners failed to file any paperwork for renewal, resulting in the station's license expiration, and the station's legal calls were deleted from the database, appended as "DWOLY".

On June 13, 2006, the FCC sent the owners a letter, stating that the station was on the air illegally, and must cease broadcasting; the owners never responded to that letter. It wasn't until January 15, 2009 that the owners filed paperwork to the FCC for a renewal of license and a "special temporary authority". The owners explained that they did attempt to file the renewal in a timely manner before the 2004 expiration, but, according to the FCC:

...its president could not electronically file a renewal application because he was "completely befuddled by the electronic filing requirements of the FCC... [and that his] Internet Service Provider was not compatible with the FCC's electronic filing system." Christian Family Network also claims that despite numerous telephone calls to Commission staff, "no staff member advised [the president] that a paper renewal application could be filed if accompanied by a request for waiver of the mandatory electronic filing requirement."

The FCC refused to accept the owner's reason. On May 27, 2009, the FCC denied WOLY's renewal and petition, and mandated that the station leave the air immediately. WOLY complied with the order and is no longer on the air.
