= WCOQ =

- Alfred, New York; United States
- Frequency: 101.9 MHz

Programming
- Format: Christian radio

Ownership
- Owner: Family Life Network

History
- Former call signs: WZKZ (1996–2021)
- Call sign meaning: "Where Christ Offers Quietness"

Technical information
- Licensing authority: FCC
- Facility ID: 52126
- Class: A
- ERP: 1,000 watts
- HAAT: 244 meters (801 ft)
- Transmitter coordinates: 42°11′25″N 77°49′17″W

Links
- Public license information: Public file; LMS
- Website: familylife.org

WCOQ (101.9 FM) is a radio station broadcasting a Christian radio format. Licensed to Alfred, New York, United States, the station is currently owned by Family Life Network.

From 1999 to 2021, WCOQ was WZKZ, inheriting a call sign and country music format that had previously been heard on WNKI in Corning, New York. It was owned by Robert Pfunter's Pembrook Pines Media Group until Pfunter sold the station to Sound Communications in the mid-2010s.

The station's call sign was changed to WCOQ on June 17, 2021. In July 2021, WCOQ was included on a list of stations Family Life Network intended to acquire from Sound as part of its exit from New York radio.
