= WHKS =

Coordinates: 41.810°N 78.386°W

- Port Allegany, Pennsylvania; United States
- Broadcast area: Bradford, Pennsylvania|Olean, NY|Coudersport, PA
- Frequency: 94.9 MHz
- Branding: K 94.9

Programming
- Format: Adult contemporary

Ownership
- Owner: David Lent (dba L-Com, Inc.)
- Sister stations: WFRM

History
- First air date: July 2, 1990
- Former call signs: WNSY (9/1989-12/1989, CP)
- Call sign meaning: WH KiSs (former "Kiss FM" slogan)

Technical information
- Licensing authority: FCC
- Facility ID: 36093
- Class: A
- ERP: 1,150 Watts
- HAAT: 231 meters (758 ft)

Links
- Public license information: Public file; LMS
- Website: whkswfrm.com

WHKS is an FM radio station licensed to Port Allegany, Pennsylvania. The station, branded as "K94", broadcasts on 94.9 MHz with an adult contemporary format.

WHKS began broadcasting Sunday July 2, 1990 with studio / offices above Fox's pizza den. The station then moved next door to space above the Port Pharmacy. The transmitter site is a top Prospect Hill near Smethport.

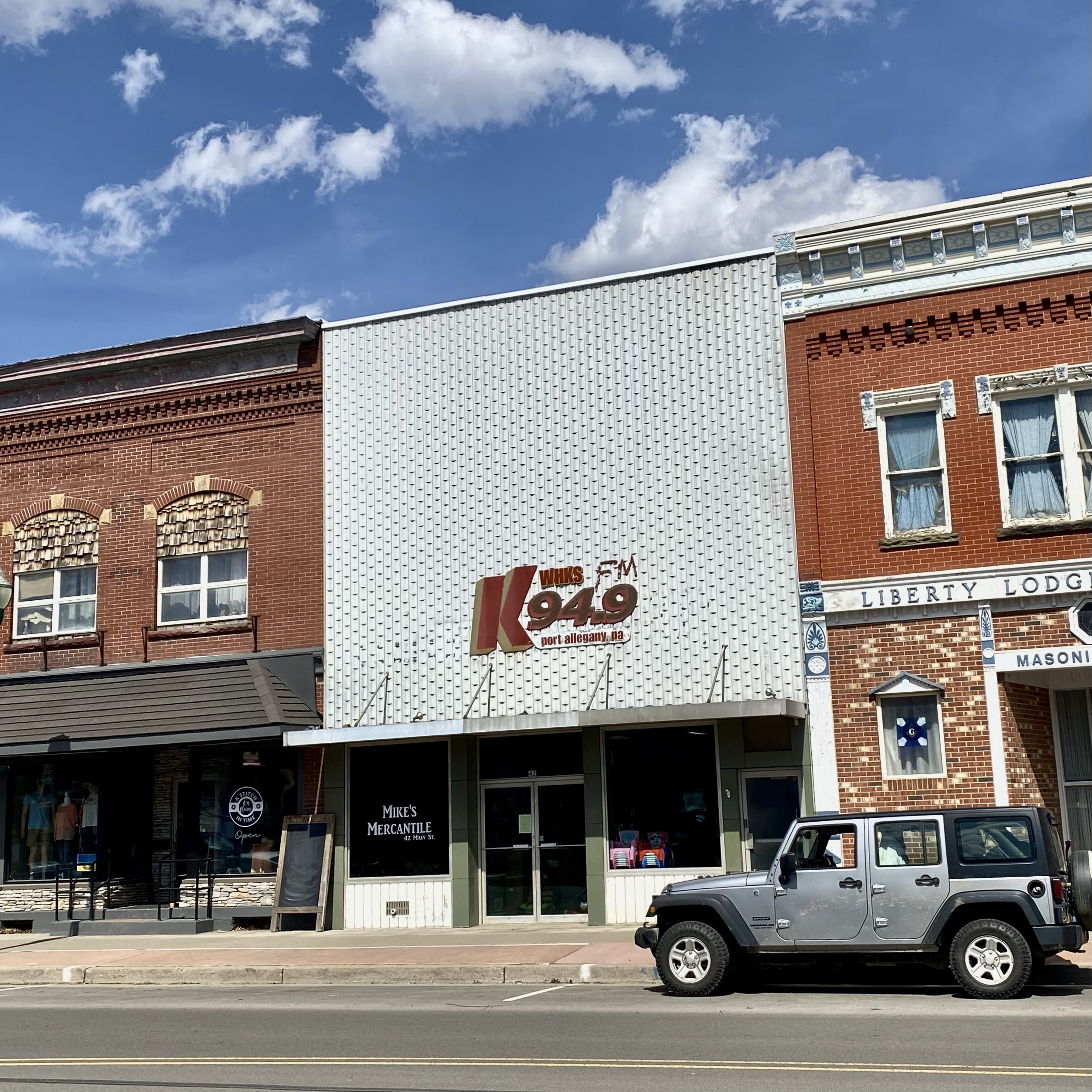
WHKS-FM's studios on North Main Street in Port Allegany, PA
