= WCOR-FM =

- Lewis Run, Pennsylvania; United States
- Broadcast area: Olean, New York
- Frequency: 96.7 MHz (HD Radio)

Programming
- Format: Silent

Ownership
- Owner: Family Life Network; (Family Life Ministries, Inc.)

History
- First air date: 1985 (as WFRM-FM)
- Former call signs: WYEF (1985); WFRM-FM (1985–2009); WLMY (2009); WBYB (2009–2011); WVTT (2011–2019); WAGL (2019); WYAY (2019); WAGL (2019–2020); WUDE (2020–2021)
- Call sign meaning: "Where Christ Offers Righteousness"

Technical information
- Licensing authority: FCC
- Facility ID: 21197
- Class: A
- ERP: 2,850 watts
- HAAT: 147 meters (482 ft)
- Transmitter coordinates: 41°57′8.2″N 78°37′32.8″W

Links
- Public license information: Public file; LMS
- Website: familylife.org

WCOR-FM (96.7 MHz) is a radio station licensed to Lewis Run, Pennsylvania, and serving Olean, New York. It is owned by the Family Life Network but has been mothballed since September 2021, with its long-term future uncertain due to ownership limits and a consolidated media scene in the western Twin Tiers.

WCOR-FM has an effective radiated power (ERP) of 460 watts. Its transmitter is on Indiana Avenue in Olean.

== History ==
=== WFRM-FM and WBYB ===
In 1985, the station signed on as WFRM-FM, licensed to Coudersport, Pennsylvania. It was the sister station to WFRM (600 AM), owned by the Farm & Home Broadcasting Company and was a member of the Allegany Mountain Radio Network. During that time, the station ran a satellite-delivered hot adult contemporary format, and in the mid-2000s, it simulcast WQRM.

The Allegheny Mountain Radio Network began disbanding in the mid-2000s. In 2008, the owners asked the Federal Communications Commission (FCC) to allow the city of license to be changed to Portville, New York. Backyard Broadcasting, owners of market leader WPIG, offered to buy the station, though the purchase eventually fell through. After the failed sale to Backyard, that company also began divesting its radio interests. Colonial Radio Group, owners of WLMI and WXMT, followed with a lower bid, which was accepted. The deal was finalized in July 2009.

Upon closing the deal, Colonial CEO Jeff Androlunis changed the call sign to WLMY (perhaps indicating a format similar to WLMI), then shortly to WBYB. Androlunis, upon signing on the signal, criticized WPIG's personality-driven format and use of classic country in its playlist, claiming he had done research that supported a new country station (Backyard Broadcasting, shortly after this, parked the WLMY calls on a station of its own, a hot-AC station in Williamsport, Pennsylvania; Colonial had owned a station in Williamsport at the time.).

Among WBYB's initial programming was the Midday Mayhem with Mindy Cunningham, a program formerly heard on WPIG. Cunningham has since left the station. Kerry Monroe, who previously hosted afternoon drive and moved to middays after Cunningham left, is also a former WPIG announcer. After about a year of simulcasting WLMI's morning show, WBYB began carrying its own morning show hosted by Androlunis and a co-host named "Sweet Tea." Later, WBYB picked up the syndicated Bob and Sheri program in the morning. The other prominent host on WBYB was Casey Hill, also formerly of WPIG; Hill hosted middays before moving to WGWE, then retiring and relocating out of the area. The Lia Show aired evenings.

WBYB carried broadcasts of Allegany-Limestone Central School sports in 2010 while W237CS carried Smethport High School athletics. WBYB's mascot during its run in country music was Bob the Builder.

=== Frequency swap and talk radio format ===
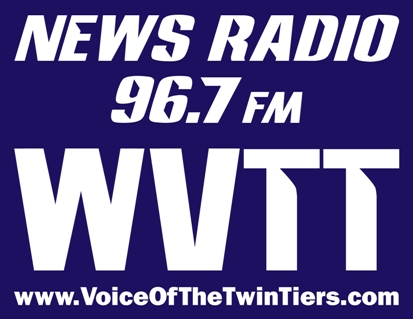
WVTT's talk radio wordmark

On October 19, 2011, WBYB's call signs were moved to FM 103.9 (then WVTT) in Kane, Pennsylvania.

From that point until the new WBYB was relocated to Eldred, Pennsylvania, on May 16, 2013, WVTT and WBYB simulcast each other. The two stations joined Premiere Networks' talk radio network in January 2012. When WBYB moved to Eldred, it broke off from its simulcast and reverted to country music, a format that 103.9 had carried for nearly 30 years in Kane under the call sign WLMI.

Programming on WVTT (96.7), as of May 2013, included The War Room with Quinn and Rose, The Glenn Beck Program, The Rush Limbaugh Show, The Sean Hannity Show, and The Dave Ramsey Show. Although the network did not list its overnight programming, at last knowledge it was also carrying the Premiere lineup of America Now with Andy Dean and Coast to Coast AM. WVTT canceled its lone local program, Twin Tiers Morning News, on April 29, 2013, and effectively closed its newsroom; a smaller newsroom reopened in July. Weather forecasts were provided by the Radio Forecast Network. After Quinn and Rose was canceled in November 2013, WVTT revived its local morning show.

=== Change to top 40 ===
In summer 2015, WVTT moved its talk radio programming to the HD2 channel and a low-powered translator W230BO (93.9). The main signal switched to Adult Top 40. (Eventually, the talk format was discontinued when 93.9 was sold to a Pennsylvania broadcaster.)

=== Change to adult country and failed sales to Rick Freeman and Seneca Broadcasting ===
On March 9, 2018, WVTT changed formats from top 40 to country, branded as "Eagle Country Throwbacks". The format complemented WAGL's hot country format and included a mix of 1980s and 1990s classics with recurrent hits from the past decade. One month after the change, on April 24, 2018, Colonial announced it had sold the station, along with WXMT and WVTT-FM, to Rick Freeman in a deal involving cash and cryptocurrency. Freeman took over the stations on May 1; as of mid-June, the station remained unchanged and automated, with Colonial still identified as the station owner in station identification and bumpers voiced by Mr. and Mrs. Andrulonis still being used. When cryptocurrency experienced a sharp decline in value in late 2018, the deal collapsed.

As part of a deal consummated in December 2018, the station adopted the WAGL call sign and the broader country format that was on 103.9 in March 2019. The 103.9 license (now WCOP) was spun off to Family Life Network.

On June 10, 2019, the station changed its call sign to WYAY, temporarily parking those calls on the station as soon as they were made available until it could place them on the Colonial station at Georgetown, South Carolina, in August, after which it changed back to WAGL. With WXMT being spun off to Bob Lowe in November, WAGL was Colonial's last broadcasting asset north of the Carolinas.

On March 18, 2020, WGWE announced it had taken over the WAGL license and was simulcasting on that station. The takeover was part of an expansion plan for the WGWE format to improve the station's signal in Olean, but two days later, WGWE stated it had ceased doing so and eventually shut down in an abrupt about-face a year later.

The call letters were changed to WUDE—previously belonging to the Colonial station at Bolivia, North Carolina—on August 8, 2020.

=== Andrulonis divests to Seven Mountains, then Family Life ===
In October 2020, Andrulonis officially exited the Twin Tiers market by agreeing to sell WUDE and three translators to WPIG's owner Seven Mountains Media, ending a rivalry between the two companies that had lasted over a decade. The sale was consummated on January 19, 2021. Four months after the sale, WUDE, which has remained silent since Seven Mountains bought the station, was identified as a station that would be divested to allow Seven Mountains to buy their lone remaining competitor cluster in Olean, the Sound Communications cluster.

As part of the divestiture, WUDE was sold to the Family Life Network effective June 1, 2021, and relocated to Bradford, Pennsylvania, as WCOR-FM. WCOR-FM briefly resumed broadcasting in August 2021, then went silent again in September of that year and requested further time silent in March 2022. The station's future under Family Life was jeopardized when the network's plans to purchase the license of WGWE in Little Valley, New York, became public; owning WGWE on top of WCOR and the other three full-service stations Family Life owns in the Olean media market would put Family Life over ownership limits, and WCOR, already being silent and the weakest full-service signal in the portfolio, could be surrendered. The Olean media market was delisted from Nielsen when Seven Mountains made its acquisitions in 2021, changing the rules for how ownership limits are calculated for the area and allowing Family Life to keep more of their signals.

Effective June 21, 2023, the station relocated to Lewis Run, Pennsylvania.
