= WOLY (AM) =

Radio station in Olean, New York

- Olean, New York; United States
- Broadcast area: Olean, New York; Bradford, Pennsylvania
- Frequency: 1450 kHz
- Branding: Big Oly 107.1 & 105.5

Programming
- Format: Classic hits
- Affiliations: Compass Media Networks

Ownership
- Owner: Seven Mountains Media; (Southern Belle, LLC)
- Sister stations: WOEN, WPIG, WMXO, WQRS

History
- First air date: 1929; 97 years ago (in Tupper Lake as WHDL); December 11, 1934 (in Olean as WHDL)
- Former call signs: WHDL (1929–2019)
- Call sign meaning: a play on the name of Olean

Technical information
- Licensing authority: FCC
- Facility ID: 2863
- Class: C
- Power: 1,000 watts
- Transmitter coordinates: 42°4′39″N 78°28′32″W
- Translators: 105.5 W288EK (Olean); 107.1 W296DB (Olean)

Links
- Public license information: Public file; LMS
- Webcast: Listen live
- Website: bigolyradio.com

WOLY (1450 kHz) is an AM radio station in Olean, New York, United States. The station is owned by Seven Mountains Media. It currently runs a 1970s to 1990s (and occasionally 1960s) classic hits format branded as "Big Oly 107.1 and 105.5," branding itself after its two FM translators.

The station was issued an initial construction permit, with the sequentially issued call letters WHDL, in December 1928 to George F. Bissell in Tupper Lake, New York. In 1934 the station moved to Olean as the oldest station in Cattaraugus County, signing on there on December 11, 1934. It was affiliated with ABC since its days as the Blue Network through the early 2010s. Former congressman James F. Hastings managed WHDL from 1952 to 1966. The station was historically an oldies outlet known as "14 Karat Gold" since at least the 1980s, a format that was dropped in 2013 in favor of a 24-hour ESPN Radio feed, branded as "The Huddle" (a backronym of the station's long-established call sign).

On August 8, 2016, WHDL changed its format from ESPN sports to top 40/CHR, branded as "Hot 107.1" (simulcast on FM translator W296DB in Olean). The format change took advantage of FCC regulations allowing an AM station to be broadcast on FM translators far removed from their city of license (the translator was relocated from Elmira).

On July 26, 2019, the station changed its call sign to WOLY, taking on a new call sign for the first time in its 90-year history. On July 29, 2019, WOLY changed its format from top 40/CHR to classic hits, branded as "Big Oly 107.1", returning the station to a format of older music. (The concept is loosely based on that of another Seven Mountains station, WLUI, which goes by "Big Lewie" in deference to its home city of Lewistown, Pennsylvania.) WPIG disc jockeys serve double duty for the new format (including Gary Nease, who served as morning host during the 14 Karat Gold era and briefly reprised that role in Big Oly's opening months), which is attempting to compete with the markets's predominant classic hits outlet WXMT, another classic hits newcomer that changed later in 2019 after a change in ownership; and indirectly with Buffalo classic hits outlet WHTT-FM, which also registered measurable listenership. WGWE eventually dropped out of the competition in 2021 after its owner (the Seneca Nation of Indians) withdrew its support for the station; in May 2022, Seven Mountains set up a translator for WOLY in Salamanca on 105.5, a short distance down the dial from WGWE's former frequency of 105.9. The 105.5 translator broadcasts from the tower of sister station WQRS.

Both WXMT and WOLY have drifted to a 1980s and 1990s-centered classic hits format since their launches, largely leaving the older music to rimshot signals such as WJQZ and WKZA.

== Programming ==
WOLY shares much of its programming with sister stations WZHD, WPHD-FM, WLUI, WKYL and WOGA, including morning host Lee Richey, midday host Nancy Plum, and afternoon host Chris Randolph. Compass Media Networks' The Night Shift with Craig Allen airs in evenings.

== Translators ==
WOLY simulcasts on these two FM translators:

Broadcast translators for WOLY
Call sign	Frequency	City of license	FID	ERP (W)	Class	FCC info
W288EK	105.5 FM	Salamanca, New York	139275	250	D	LMS
W296DB	107.1 FM	Olean, New York	49419	250	D	LMS
