= WFRM =

- Coudersport, Pennsylvania; United States
- Broadcast area: North Central Pennsylvania
- Frequency: 600 kHz

Programming
- Format: Oldies–Adult Standards
- Affiliations: Westwood One's "America's Best Music"; ABC Radio News

Ownership
- Owner: L-Com Inc.
- Sister stations: WHKS

History
- First air date: May 1953; 72 years ago
- Call sign meaning: Farm & Home Broadcasting (original owner)

Technical information
- Licensing authority: FCC
- Facility ID: 21196
- Class: D
- Power: 1,000 watts (day); 46 watts (night)
- Translator: 96.5 W243EB (Coudersport)

Links
- Public license information: Public file; LMS

WFRM (600 kHz) is a commercial radio station, licensed to Coudersport, Pennsylvania, and serving listeners in Potter, Elk, Mckean & Cameron counties in North Central Pennsylvania. It broadcasts the Good Time Oldies format.

WFRM and its sister station, WHKS 94.9 FM in Port Allegany, are owned by L-Com, Inc., a company controlled by David Lent.

By day, WFRM is powered at 1,000 watts. At night it reduces power to 46 watts, to protect other stations on 600 AM from interference. WFRM uses a non-directional antenna, with its transmitter on Radio Tower Road at Dutch Hill Road in Coudersport. Programming is also heard on FM translator W243EB at 96.5 MHz.

== History ==
WFRM first signed on the air in May 1953. It was originally a daytimer, required to go off the air at sunset to avoid interference to other stations on 600 AM.

In the summer of 1953, the Smethport Centennial Celebration was the first "special event" covered by WFRM, the new radio station in Coudersport just constructed by the Farm & Home Broadcasting Company. Broadcast lines were installed and temporary broadcast facilities were put in place in Smethport to cover many of the Centennial activities. Pete and Bill, the stars of the morning show, were photographed in the derby hats that everyone in Smethport was wearing as part of the celebration. That photo is still on the wall at WFRM's current studio location at 9 South Main Street in downtown Coudersport.

When the McKean County Fair came along again, radio was a big part. Gert Curley, who was widely known as "Betty Bradford" brought her popular WESB interview show to the fairgrounds. WFRM also came to the Fair. A large tent along the midway was filled with country music entertainers from McKean, Potter and surrounding counties. Crowds loved it.

One of the early disc jockeys on WFRM was afternoon host Danny Neaverth, who worked at the station between 1957 and 1959, becoming better known as the morning man at legendary Buffalo radio station 1520 WKBW.

Encouraged by the enthusiastic reception from folks in Smethport, WFRM decided to put a local office and studio in Smethport. It was located on the second floor of the Auto Parts store on West Main Street. Bob and Lois Johnson became the nucleus of the staff in Smethport and an effort was made to expand the service to this part of the WFRM Coverage area. Russ Wells was the announcer, and Bob Morrison was the engineer. An hour each day was broadcast over the radio from this studio. These daily broadcasts continued for about three years. Meanwhile, the Johnsons had relocated to Kane, and joined the staff that was building the new radio station facility there.

WFRM was joined by an FM sister, 96.7 WFRM-FM, on September 18, 1985. WFRM-FM in 2008 received approval by the FCC to be licensed to Portville, New York. It was sold to Colonial Radio Group, owners of WLMI, switching to a Christian radio format. 600 WFRM was sold to L-Com (Lent Communications, a company controlled by David Lent), owner of Port Allegany-based WHKS. Lent had worked from the time of his graduation from Coudersport area Jr. Sr. High School in 1973 up until former co-workers James (Jim) Linn and Theresa Blewett constructed WHKS-FM in Port Allegany, Pennsylvania in July 1990. Linn & Blewett sold L-Com Inc. (licensee of WHKS) to Lent in 1993. WFRM began simulcasting on an FM translator at 96.5 in 2020.

== FM translator ==
Call sign	Frequency	City of license	FID	ERP (W)	HAAT	Class	Transmitter coordinates	FCC info
W243EB	96.5 FM	Coudersport, Pennsylvania	201645	30	207 m (679 ft)	D	41°45′11.2″N 78°0′2″W	LMS
