= Baseball in the United States =

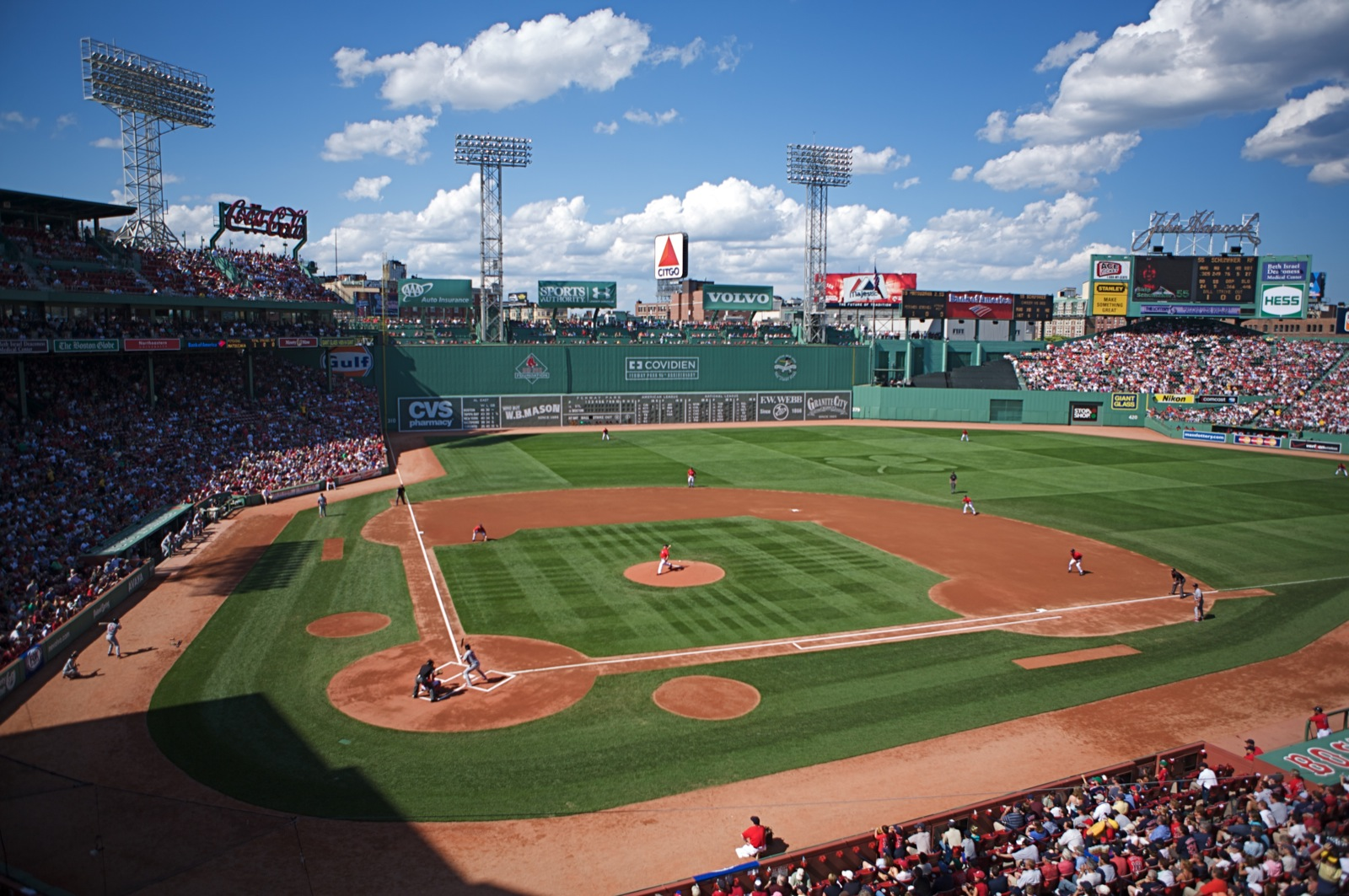
- Fenway Park in Boston is the oldest ballpark in Major League Baseball.
- Country: United States
- Governing body: USA Baseball
- National teams: Men's national team; Women's national team
- First played: 1862

Club competitions
- Major League Baseball (Major league); Minor League Baseball: International League (AAA); Pacific Coast League (AAA); Eastern League (AA); Southern League (AA); Texas League (AA); Midwest League (A+); Northwest League (A+); South Atlantic League (A+); California League (A); Carolina League (A); Florida State League (A); Arizona Complex League (Rookie); Florida Complex League (Rookie); Arizona Fall League (off-season minor league); Independent leagues: American Association of Professional Baseball; Atlantic League; Frontier League; Pioneer League

International competitions
- Summer Olympics; WBSC Premier12; World Baseball Classic; Women's Baseball World Cup; U-23 Baseball World Cup; U-18 Baseball World Cup; U-15 Baseball World Cup; U-12 Baseball World Cup

Major League Baseball (MLB) is the highest level of baseball in the United States. Baseball is one of the most popular sports in the U.S. for both participants and spectators and has been considered a national pastime since the late 19th century.

MLB's World Series is the culmination of professional American baseball's postseason each October. It is played between the winners of MLB's two leagues, the American League (AL) and the National League (NL). Prior to the World Series, the winner of each league is determined in a best-of-seven playoff called the League Championship Series (LCS), in which one team in each league comes away with their league's pennant; the winner of the American League Championship Series (ALCS) receives the American League Pennant, and the winner of the National League Championship Series (NLCS) receives the National League Pennant. Six teams from each league compete in the postseason. After a champion is crowned from each league, the winner of the World Series is determined through a best-of-seven playoff.

As baseball developed in the 19th century in the Northeastern United States, it has been played and followed in the region longer than any other sport in the nation. As of 2022, the Philadelphia Phillies, founded in 1883, are the oldest continuous same-name, same-city franchise in both Major League Baseball and all professional sports in the United States and Canada.

An extensive minor league baseball system covers most mid-sized cities in the United States. Minor league baseball teams are organized in a six-tier hierarchy, in which the highest teams (AAA) are in major cities that do not have a major league team but often have a major team in another sport, and each level occupies progressively smaller cities. The lowest levels of professional baseball serve primarily as development systems for the sport's most inexperienced prospects, with the absolute bottom, the rookie leagues, occupying the major league squads' spring training complexes and making no effort to earn money on their own.

The World Baseball Classic, the most popular international baseball tournament for national teams, is held every four years in March. The US national baseball team won its first championship in 2017, and lost to Japan in 2023's championship game, earning second place.

Some limited independent professional baseball leagues exist in the United States, the most prominent being the Atlantic League, which occupies mostly suburban locales that are not eligible for high level minor league teams of their own. Outside the minor leagues are collegiate summer baseball leagues, which occupy towns even smaller than those at the lower end of minor league baseball and typically cannot support professional sports. Summer baseball is an amateur exercise and uses players that choose not to play for payment in order to remain eligible to play college baseball for their respective universities in the spring. Collegiate summer baseball also gives athletes the opportunity to be scouted by MLB teams.

At the absolute lowest end of the organized baseball system is senior amateur baseball (also known as Town Team Baseball), which typically plays its games only on weekends.

== Major League Baseball ==
Major League Baseball (MLB) is a professional baseball organization that is the oldest of the four major professional sports leagues in the United States and Canada, in fact the oldest professional sports league in the world. A total of 30 teams now play in the American League (AL) and National League (NL), with 15 teams in each league. The AL and NL operated as separate legal entities from 1901 and 1876 respectively. After cooperating but remaining legally separate entities since 1903, in 2000 the leagues merged into a single organization led by the Commissioner of Baseball. The organization also oversees minor league baseball leagues, which comprise about 240 teams affiliated with the major-league clubs. With the World Baseball Softball Confederation, MLB manages the international World Baseball Classic tournament.

Baseball's first professional team was founded in Cincinnati in 1869. The first few decades of professional baseball were characterized by rivalries between leagues and by players who often jumped from one team or league to another. The period before 1920 in baseball was known as the dead-ball era; players rarely hit home runs during this time. Baseball survived a conspiracy to fix the 1919 World Series, which came to be known as the Black Sox Scandal. The sport rose in popularity in the 1920s, and survived potential downturns during the Great Depression and World War II. Shortly after the war, baseball's color barrier was broken by Jackie Robinson.

New York City is for many sports fans synonymous with the New York Yankees and their logo. The team is noted as being the home of many all-time greats, and for having won more titles than any other US major professional sports franchise. The city was also host to two other highly popular baseball teams in the National League, the Brooklyn Dodgers and the New York Giants, before their transfer to California in the beginning of the 1958 season. The Yankees' chief rival, the Boston Red Sox, also enjoy a huge following in Boston and throughout New England. The fierce National League rivalry between the former Brooklyn Dodgers and New York Giants was transferred to the West Coast when the teams became the Los Angeles Dodgers and the San Francisco Giants. Philadelphia sports fans have rooted for the Phillies since 1883, as they are the oldest continuous, one-name, one-city franchise in all of professional American sports. Phillies fans are known for their enthusiastic support of their team throughout Philadelphia and the Delaware Valley, and have been dubbed as the "Meanest Fans in America". Chicago sports fans also avidly follow the Chicago Cubs and the Chicago White Sox despite the comparative lack of success for the teams over their respective histories.

The 1950s and 1960s were a time of expansion for the AL and NL, then new stadiums and artificial turf surfaces began to change the game in the 1970s and 1980s. Home runs dominated the game during the 1990s, and media reports began to discuss the use of anabolic steroids among Major League players in the mid-2000s. In 2006, an investigation produced the Mitchell Report, which implicated many players in the use of performance-enhancing substances, including at least one player from each team.

Today, MLB is composed of thirty teams: twenty-nine in the United States and one in Canada. Teams play 162 games each season and six teams in each league advance to a four-round postseason tournament that culminates in the World Series, a best-of-seven championship series between the two league champions that dates to 1903. Baseball broadcasts are aired throughout North America and in several other countries throughout the world. Games are aired on television, radio, and the Internet. MLB has the highest season attendance of any sports league in the world with more than 74 million spectators in 2013.

== Minor league baseball ==
Minor League Baseball is a hierarchy of professional baseball leagues in the Americas that compete at levels below Major League Baseball (MLB) and provide opportunities for player development and a way to prepare for the major leagues. All of the minor leagues are operated as independent businesses. Most are members of the umbrella organization known as Minor League Baseball (MiLB), which operates under the Commissioner of Baseball within the scope of organized baseball.

Except for the Mexican League, teams in the organized minor leagues are generally independently owned and operated but are directly affiliated with one major league team through a standardized Player Development Contract (PDC). These leagues also go by the nicknames the "farm system", "farm club", or "farm team(s)" because of a joke passed around by major league players in the 1930s when St. Louis Cardinals' general manager Branch Rickey formalized the system, and teams in small towns were "growing players down on the farm like corn".

Since the last major reorganization in 2021, the Minor League Baseball hierarchy is separated into the classes of AAA, AA, High-A, Low-A and Rookie; the Short-Season A and Rookie-Advanced classifications were eliminated. Major League Baseball and Minor League Baseball teams enter into ten-year PDCs; these provide greater long-term stability over the previously-used terms of two or four years, which made affiliations much more common. At the expiration of a PDC term, teams may renew their affiliation or sign new PDCs with different clubs, though many relationships are renewed repeatedly and have endured for extended time periods. For example, the Omaha Storm Chasers (formerly the Omaha Royals) have been the AAA affiliate of the Kansas City Royals since the Royals joined the American League in 1969; the Columbus Clippers changed affiliations, after being associated with the New York Yankees from 1979, to the Washington Nationals in 2007 and have been affiliated with the Cleveland Guardians since 2009. A few minor league teams are directly owned by their parent club (such as the Springfield Cardinals by the St. Louis Cardinals, and all of the Atlanta Braves' affiliates except the Carolina Mudcats). Minor League teams that are owned directly by their parent club do not have PDCs, and hence are not part of the reaffiliation shuffle.

A special minor league is the Arizona Fall League. It operates outside the conventional Minor League Baseball hierarchy, being owned by MLB as a whole. Teams generally assign many of their top prospects from the AAA and AA classes to the league's six teams for additional offseason practice.

Today, 19 affiliated minor baseball leagues operate with 246 member clubs in large, medium, and small towns, as well as the suburbs of major cities, across the United States, Canada, Mexico, the Dominican Republic, and Venezuela.

== World Baseball Classic ==
Team USA logo.

The World Baseball Classic is the most well known international baseball tournament in the United States, and is broadcast on FOX. The World Baseball Classic is held every March, every three to four years in the United States and other countries, and is the biggest international baseball tournament in the world.

The United States national baseball team, more commonly referred to as Team USA, has competed in all iterations of the tournament. They reached the quarterfinals in 2006, the semi-finals in 2009, the quarterfinals in 2013, before finally winning their first championship in 2017.

The 2023 World Baseball Classic saw rivals Team USA and Samurai Japan play in the final. This matchup was watched by up to 5.2 million Americans, more than the number of viewers at the MLB postseason NLDS and Wild Card Series. Viewership peaked at 6.5 million as Shohei Ohtani struck out Mike Trout to secure Japan's 3rd World Baseball Classic Championship.

== Independent baseball ==
Independent baseball leagues also exist, primarily placing their teams in suburban municipalities that lack minor league baseball teams of their own, particularly in the Northeast megalopolis. Most such leagues operate with a level of talent comparable to the middle and lower ends of the minor league system. During Major League Baseball's reorganization of the Minor League system, the four most prominent independent leagues (the Atlantic League, American Association, Frontier League, and Pioneer Baseball League) were invited to became MLB Partner Leagues, working to promote the sport in areas not served by organized baseball in turn for being scouted by MLB franchises for potential talent and testing possible rule changes. The Pioneer League had previously been an affiliated Rookie league, but was dropped during the reorganization and opted to continue play as an independent league.

== College baseball ==
College baseball is played on the intercollegiate level at institutions of higher education. In comparison to football and basketball, college competition in the United States plays a smaller role in developing professional players, as baseball's professional minor leagues are more extensive. Moving directly from high school to the professional level is more common in baseball than in football or basketball. However, if players enroll at a four-year college, they must complete three years to regain eligibility, unless they reach age 21 before starting their third year of attendance. Players who enroll at junior colleges (i.e., two-year institutions) regain eligibility after one year at that level, Bryce Harper being a notable example. In 2013, there are 298 NCAA Division I teams in the United States.

As with most other U.S. intercollegiate sports, competitive college baseball is played under the auspices of the NCAA or the NAIA. The NCAA writes the rules of play, while each sanctioning body supervises season-ending tournaments. The final rounds of the NCAA tournaments are known as the College World Series; one is held on each of the three levels of competition sanctioned by the NCAA. The College World Series for Division I takes place in Omaha, Nebraska in June, following the regular season. The playoff bracket for Division I consists of 64 teams, with four teams playing at each of 16 regional sites (in a double-elimination format). The 16 winners advance to the Super Regionals at eight sites, played head-to-head in a best-of-three series. The eight winners then advance to the College World Series, a double elimination tournament (actually two separate four-team brackets) to determine the two national finalists. The finalists play a best-of-three series to determine the Division I national champion.

Players seeking a professional career in baseball after college typically continue playing by way of collegiate summer baseball during the summer months after each college season ends. Dozens of collegiate summer baseball leagues, all of them independent from each other and from any other baseball organization, exist, each varying widely in level of talent, ranging from the elite Cape Cod League down to leagues that draw primarily from regional colleges. The one feature common to all collegiate summer baseball leagues is the use of wooden baseball bats like those used in the professional game, but college baseball uses metal bats.

== Adult and semi-professional baseball ==
See: Baseball awards § U.S. adult and semi-professional baseball

== Amateur baseball ==
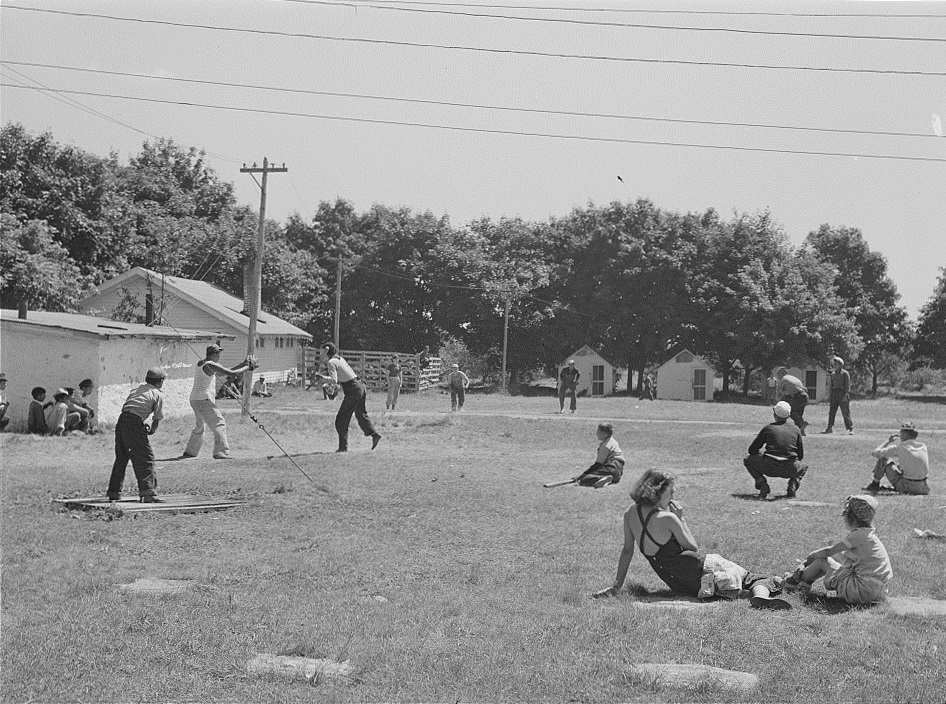
Cherry pickers playing baseball at an orchard work camp in Door County, Wisconsin in July 1940

Amateur baseball is baseball in which the players either are not paid for playing, or (as in Town Team Baseball) receive only a modest stipend or employment arranged by the team's boosters. Amateur baseball is played in the United States by players of all ages, from young children to adults.

== High-school baseball ==
See: Baseball awards#U.S. high-school baseball and High school sports.

== Youth baseball ==
See: Baseball awards#U.S. youth baseball

== Popularity ==
During the 21st century baseball has experienced a decline of popularity in terms of television viewership and participation among children.

== See also ==
- History of baseball in the United States
- USA Baseball
- USA Baseball National Training Complex
