= Dirt track racing =

Venue of auto racing performed on dirt surfaces

Dirt track racing is a form of motorsport held on clay or dirt surfaced banked oval racetracks. Dirt track racing started in the United States before World War I and became widespread during the 1920s and 1930s using both automobiles and motorcycles, spreading throughout Japan and often running on horse racing tracks. There are a myriad of types of race cars used, from open wheel Sprint cars and Modifieds to stock cars. While open wheel race cars are purpose-built racing vehicles, stock cars (also known as fendered cars) can be either purpose-built race cars or street vehicles that have been modified to varying degrees. There are hundreds of local and regional racetracks throughout the United States and also throughout Japan. The sport is also popular in Canada, Mexico, Argentina, Brazil, Chile, Australia, New Zealand, South Africa and the United Kingdom.

== Racetrack ==
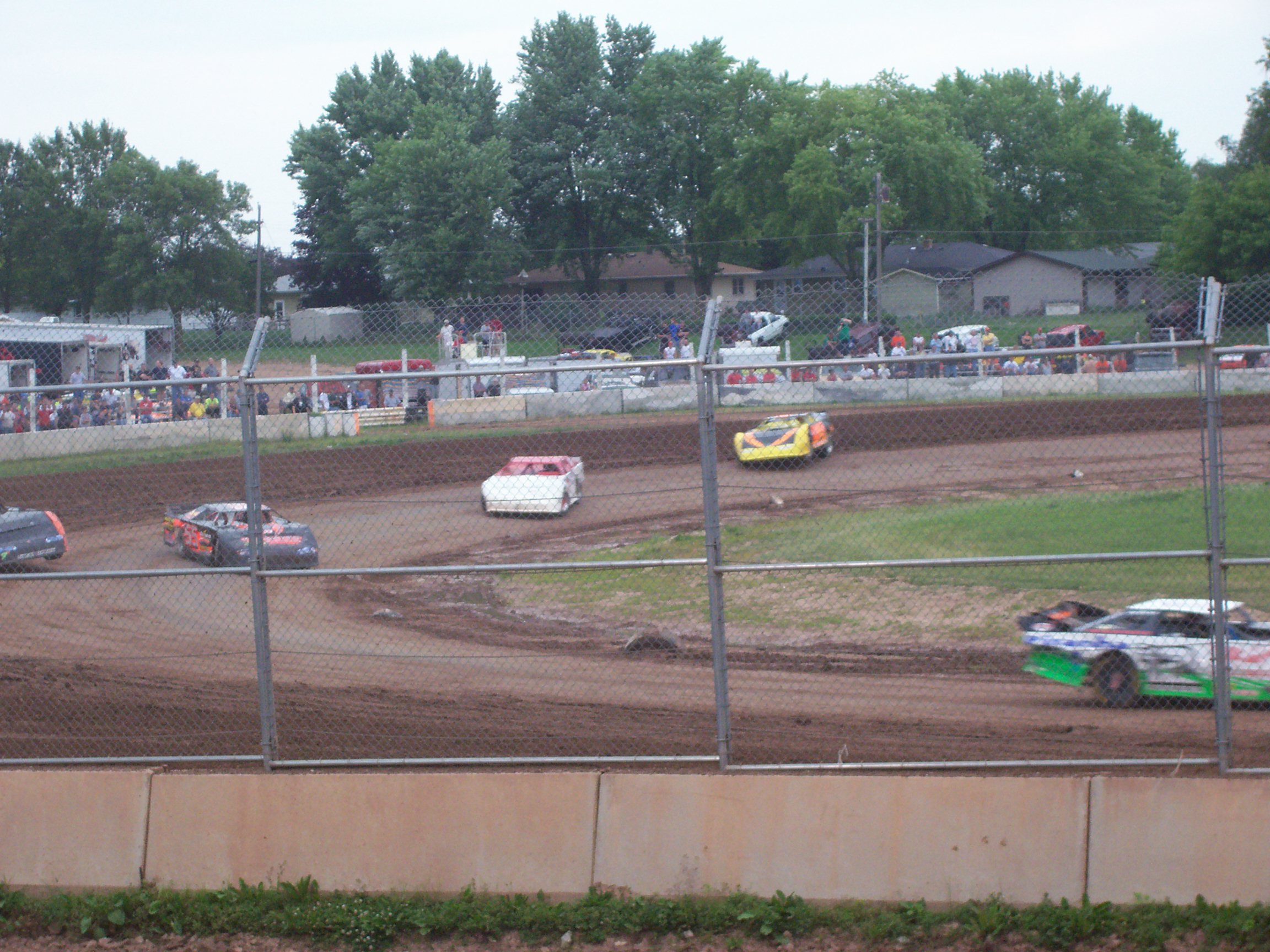
Late Model drivers sliding through a corner.

A dirt track's racing surface may be composed of any soil, although most seasoned dirt racers probably consider a moist, properly prepared clay oval their favorite dirt racing surface. Preparing a dirt track correctly for racing is both a traditional learned craft as well as a long and complex job requiring hours of work. Typical machines used in track preparation include a grader, a cultivator or rototiller, 2 types of rollers and a watering truck, although the process varies at different dirt tracks around the world. After an event, a track's rutted surface is first graded and smoothed back into the contours of the track's layout. then further smooth and tamp loose soil shoveled into any soft spots. The freshly smoothed track surface is then aerated with a cultivator or rototiller to loosen the now-compacted upper layer and assist with greater water penetration for a moister track on race day. Watering is repeated as necessary according to climate, location and soil composition. Using offset boom nozzles to on water trucks will avoid mashing aerated soil. A dirt track should be rolled and watered as required on race morning with a final light watering, just prior to wheel-packing. Outdoor dirt tracks are typically aerated 12" deep.

=== North America ===
Nearly all tracks are oval and less than 1-mile (1.6 km) in length with most being 1/2 mile (800 m) or less. The most common increments in the U.S. are 1/2 mile (800 m), 3/8 mile (600 m), 1/3 mile (540 m), 1/4 mile (400 m), and 1/8 mile (200 m). With the longer tracks, the race cars achieve higher speeds up to 160 mph (260 km/h) and the intervals between cars increase. This decreases the chance of crashes but increases the damage and chance of injury when cars do crash.

=== United Kingdom ===
In Great Britain the oval tracks are normally on grass with lengths of 400 meters (¼ mile) to 800 meters (½ mile). The races consist of several four lap qualifying heats that eliminate slower drivers. Then there is a final race featuring the fastest competitors.

=== Europe ===
In mainland Europe, long tracks can be grass, sand or cinder, and can be up to 1-kilometer (0.62 mi) long.

=== Australia ===
Dirt track racing in Australia has a history dating back to the 1920s and 1930s. Most oval track speedways are similar to those in the US for car racing such as sprint cars, speedcars (midgets) and sedans, with most tracks generally around 1/4 to 1/3 mile (400 to 540 m) in length. Most tracks have a clay surface, though some use dolomite, dolomite and clay mix or even sand and clay mix. During the 1970s and early 1980s, a small number of tracks were paved with asphalt, though this phase only lasted about a decade and all tracks paved over eventually reverted to their former surfaces.

== Race vehicles ==
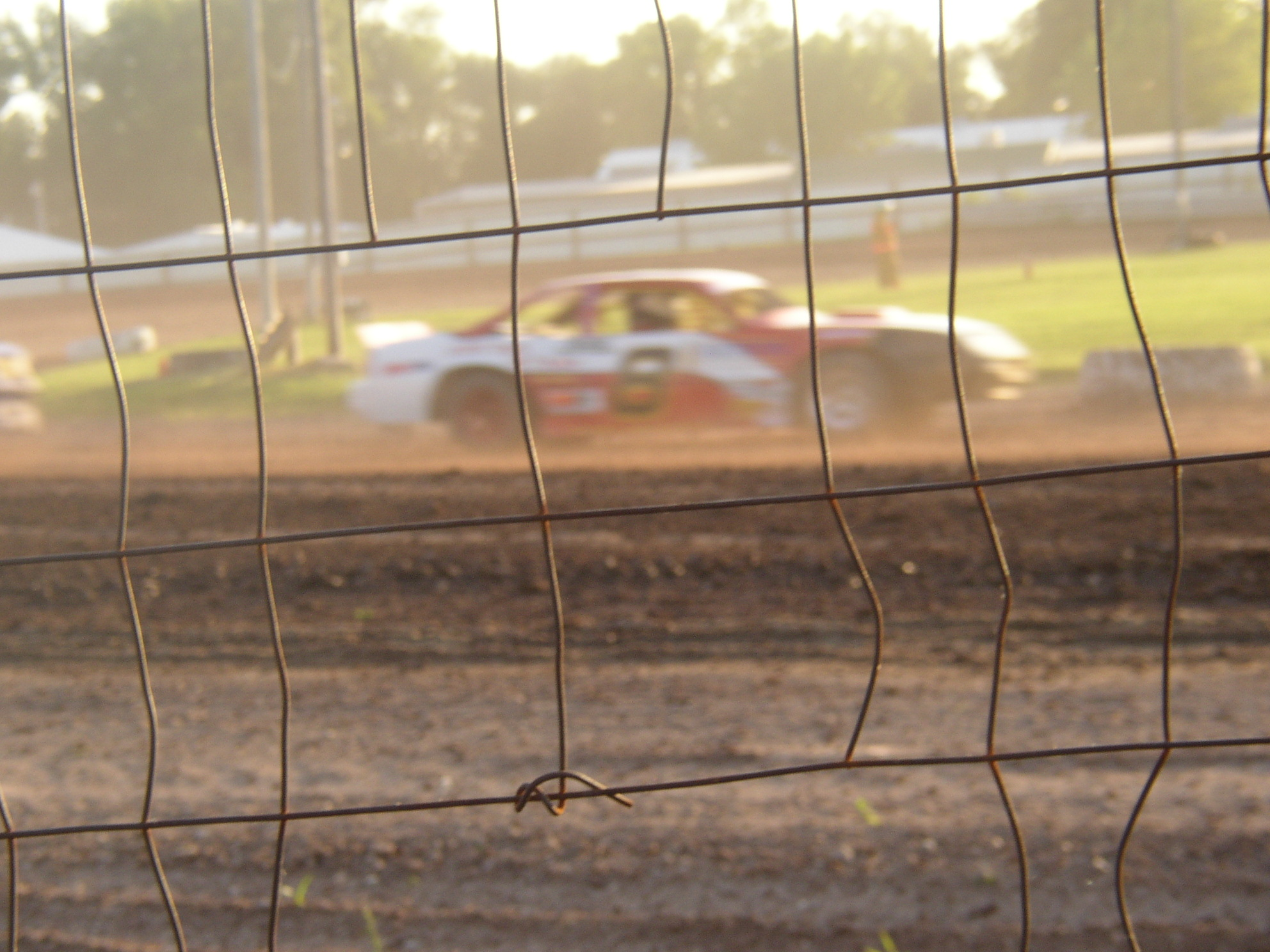
A typical dirt track "street stock" car racing in Wisconsin

Each racetrack or sponsoring organization maintains a rule book outlining each class of race car which includes dimensions, engine size, equipment requirements and prohibitions. The requirements for each class are usually coordinated with multiple tracks to allow for the widest available venue for each type of car. This coordination allows the drivers to compete at many different racetracks, increase competitors' chances of winning, and lets racing associations develop a series of race events that promote fan interest.

Many tracks support two types of racing in their programs, open wheel cars and stock cars. Both types range from large and powerful V8 engines to small yet still powerful, four-cylinder engines. Some of the smaller open wheel race cars have classes for single-cylinder engines. Depending on the class, the cars may have wings to aid in handling at higher speeds.

=== Open wheel cars ===
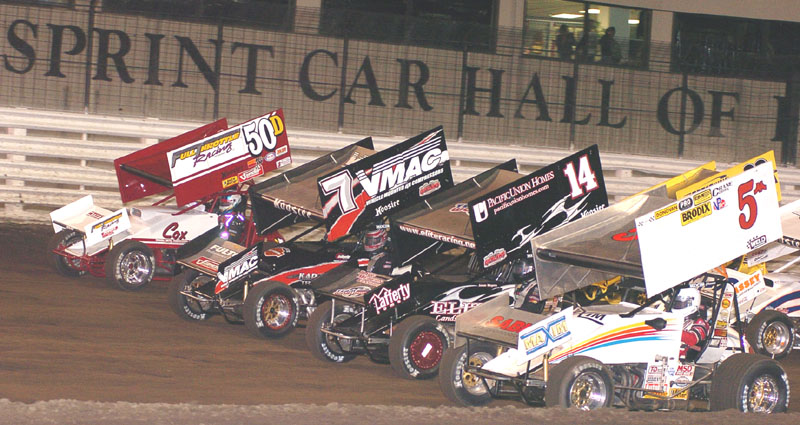
Dirt sprint cars

Open wheel cars are generally manufactured with tubular frames and a body purchased for that particular class. The wheels of these vehicles are not protected by fenders; they are exposed or "open".

Classes include:

- Dwarf (5/8 replicas of 1928 to 1948 coupes and sedans)
- Mod lite - 1000-1250cc motorcycle engines (5/8 replicas of full size modified but equally as fast)
- Kart (go kart)
- Mini sprint- 600-1200cc motorcycle engines. Usually utilize a top wing.
- Winged sprint- 410ci, 360ci engine, or 305ci engines. The top wing helps these fast and powerful racecars with downforce.
- Non-wing sprint car
- Silver crown
- Midget (speedcar)
- Three quarter midget (TQ)
- Quarter midget
- 600 and 270 micro sprints

Open wheel sanctioning bodies include:

- USAC - The United States Automobile Club
- World of Outlaws Sprint Cars (410ci engine national touring series)
- All Star Circuit of Champions (410ci engine upper Midwest, mid-Atlantic and Atlantic touring series)
- High Limit Sprint Car Series (410ci sprint car series)
- American Sprint Car Series (ASCS) (360ci engine national touring series)
- United Sprint Car Series (USCS) (360ci engine mid south and south touring series)
- MOWA (410ci engine Midwest touring series)
- POWRi (midgets and mini sprints)

Popular chassis manufacturers around the country for winged sprint cars are Eagle, Maxim, J&J, Triple X, and GF1. There are also several engine builders that build both 410ci and 360ci engines for traveling sprint car teams. Speedway, Kistler, Gaerte, Wesmar, Shaver, Don Ott Racing Engines, and Fisher Racing Engines are the more popular engine builders.

=== Modified cars ===
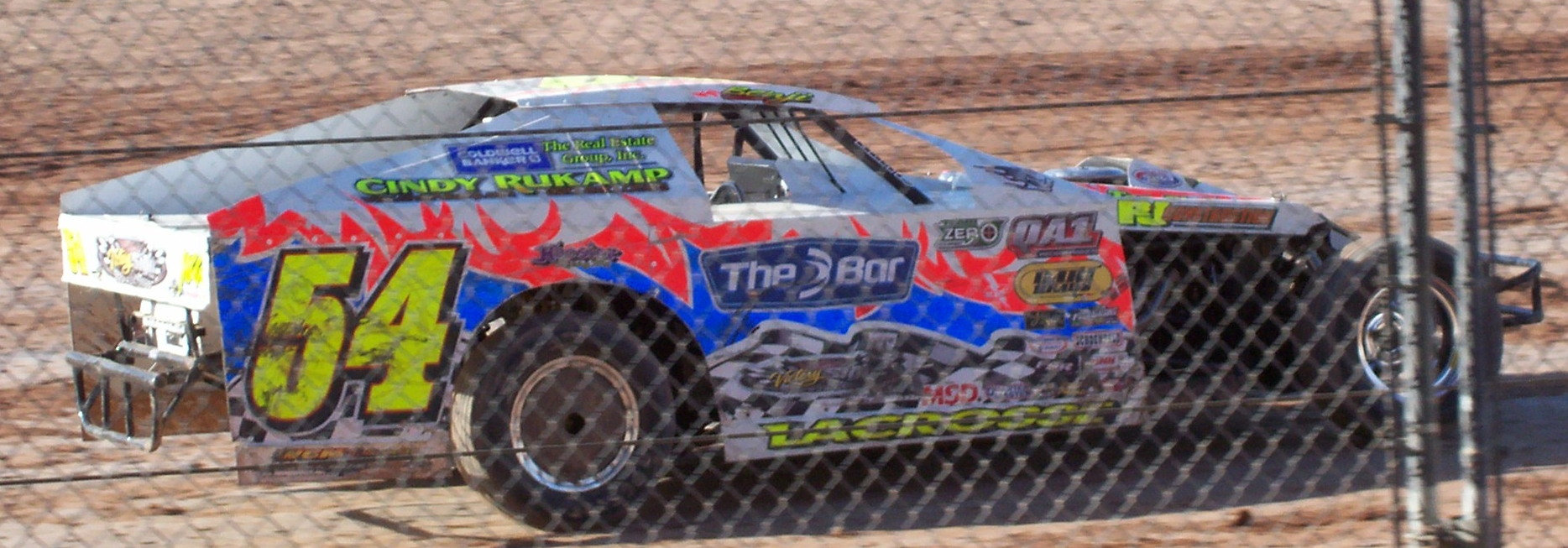
IMCA Modified car

Modified cars are a hybrid of open wheel cars and stock cars. This class of car has the racing characteristics of a stock car. The rear wheels are covered by fenders, but the front wheels are left exposed. There are sanctioning bodies that control the rules for this class at most tracks. Each sanctioning body has their own set of guidelines provided in an annual rule book and their own registration fees. Sanctioning bodies include:

- Super DIRTcar Series
- IMCA (International Motor Contest Association)
- UMP (United Midwestern Promoters)
- USRA (United States Racing Association)
- USMTS (United States Modified Touring Series)
- WISSOTA (WISSOTA Promoters' Association)
- TSMA (Tri-State Modified Association)

=== Full-bodied cars ===
Full-bodied cars, sometimes referred to as stock cars, are vehicles that, unlike open-wheel cars, have fenders covering all wheels. Full-bodied cars can vary from full tube frame chassis and aluminum bodied late models to automobiles manufactured by the major automakers with certain modifications as allowed for each class. There are several general types:

==== Modified production cars ====
These cars are modified manufactured automobiles. There is a high degree of variability between classes of modified cars. The lowest divisions of modified production cars may be completely stock except for having their interior or windshields removed. The highest divisions of modified production cars may have only a few original stock parts and may be nearly as fast as late model race cars. Most cars have their glass windshields removed and their interiors stripped out. The original seat may be allowed to be used in the lowest classes, but a racing seat and roll cage is required to be installed in higher divisions. Other safety and performance features are added to higher division cars. The engines in lower divisions are completely stock, and higher divisions are highly modified and enhanced. Most modified production cars use full exhaust systems. Engines vary from unmodified 4 cylinders to highly modified V8. Cars in lower divisions use stock tires, and higher division cars use purpose-built specified racing tires.

Common names of modified production car divisions:

- Limited late model (604 crate LM)
- 602/sportsman (A-hobby/cadet/super street)
- Pony/mini stocks (4-cyl.)
- FWD front wheel drives (stingers/hot shots/hornets) BJP Racing or B&J Performance is among the highest ranking 4cyl race cars in the country
- Bombers (hobby/thunder/outlaw stock/pure stock)
- Cruisers (Road warriors/renegades)
- Legends/mod lites (dwarfs)

===== Pure Stock =====
These are Full-bodied cars with very few changes allowed from the factory models sold for general use on the streets. Changes can be limited to a certain type of tire, making some parts of the car stronger to withstand the punishment of racing and so forth. All cars used on the race track are required to have a full set of Roll Cages and safety harnesses to protect the drivers. Some tracks have what they call Hornets which are smaller unibody cars with 4-cylinder engines, that must be pretty much as they left the factory except for the roll cage. These would also be considered Pure Stock, but not full sized.

===== Street Stock =====
These are also Full-bodied cars but can have changes to the frame, engines, tires and some changes to the suspension. They have to have bodies shaped like the actual cars that are used on the street direct from the factory. As with the Pure Stocks cars, all are required to have a full set of Roll Cages and safety harnesses to protect the drivers.

===== Super Stock =====
Super Stock cars are very similar to Late Models and can be built from the ground up by the racers. They have limited engines and other restricted items that keep them from being full blown Late Models, but they are much more powerful than the Street Stocks and are an intermediate class between Street Stock, Modifieds and Late Models. The bodies are aftermarket or made by the racers in the general shape of the brand being represented (Chevrolet, Ford, Dodge, etc.).

==== Unmodified production cars ====
These cars are automobiles just as driven on the street; including the original interiors. The engines may be modified as allowed under different rules: Saloon

===== Non-production cars =====
These are stock cars custom built for racing, usually with welded tubular frames and custom built or purchased bodies.

The most popular type of dirt full-bodied stock cars are late models. They are categorized depending on what track and series that is being run. The racetrack dictates what type of late model is raced, but most fall into one of these categories:

====== Late model ======
Current dirt super late models feature steel constructed tube frame chassis with aluminum bodies that give them the sleek aerodynamic appearance of a stock race car but there is nothing stock about these 2300 pound machines. The cars are powered by an 850 horsepower (630 kW) motor than can turn in excess of 9,000 rpm. The engines are based on V-8 Chevrolet, Chrysler, and Ford power plants. These cars are considered to be the most sophisticated cars in dirt racing. They hit speeds well over 100 mph (160 km/h) and slide around the dirt corners. They are raced on dirt tracks throughout the country anywhere from 1/5 to one mile.

The expense for these cars is significant. The cost for one complete race-ready late model is around $70,000. There is also cheaper equipment and parts that can be purchased, but staying competitive is much more expensive. To get the frame (chassis) and parts all new without the transmission and motor is around 20,000 to 30,000 dollars depending on the quality and from which manufacturer the chassis comes. The top manufacturers around the country include Rocket, Sweet-Bloomquist, Club 29, Longhorn, MB Customs, Black Diamond Racecars, GRT, Warrior, Barry Wright Racecars, Rayburn, MasterSbilt, Kryptonite, Domination chassis, and Schwartz Race Cars. The engines for these cars are around 850 horsepower and can cost up to 40,000 dollars. Motor builders include Hatfield Racing, Jay Dickens Racing Engines, Durham Racing Engines, Cornett Racing Engines, Sheered Engine Development, Gaerte Racing Engines, Clements Racing Engines, Custom Racing Engines, Vic Hill Racing Engines and Pro Power Engines.

Most racing series and special events offer different motor options with the use of different total vehicle weights to create an even playing field:

- Open motor - there is no displacement limit with this type of motor. Most open motors exceed 400 cubic inches but the 380 small block is also a common open motor. These motors utilize aluminium blocks and heads and often have specially welded cams. The cars which run this motor option must weigh at least 2,350 lb (1,070 kg). Cars utilizing a steel block must weigh 2300 lb.
- Spec motor- spec motors are built to the series' specifications. The motor can be either steel, aluminium or a combination. Spec motors typically cannot exceed 358 cubic inches (5.87 L). Cars using this motor option weigh in at 2,300 lb (1,000 kg) and run a 10-or-12-inch (250 or 300 mm) spoiler.
- All steel motor - steel block and heads, a maximum of 362 cubic inches (5.93 L), and weigh in at either 2200 or 2150 pounds depending on the series. Cars with an all-steel motor must run a 10-or-12-inch (250 or 300 mm) spoiler.

====== Limited late model ======
Limited late models and late model stocks have the same body rules as super late models. The main difference in the two classes is the motor rules. Engine limitations typically include maximum engine displacement size, certain required cylinder head angles, maximum compression ratios, and maximum carburetor size. Suspension rules typically forbid the use of expensive canister shocks. Tire choice is also typically limited to a certain tire such as the Hoosier D55 spec tire.

====== Late model stock ======
Late model stocks have the same body rules as super late models and limited late models. This class typically has even more limited engine rules.

Typical late model stock engine requirements:

- Chevrolet 350, Chrysler 360, Ford 351 engines. Must be all-steel except intake manifold.
- Engine maximum displacement of 362 cubic inches (5.93 L).
- Engines typically cannot be modified except for aftermarket carburetor, intake manifold and exhaust manifold.

Many different tracks and sanctioning bodies have variations on these rules of what constitutes an open late model, limited late model and a late model stock.

====== Crate late models ======
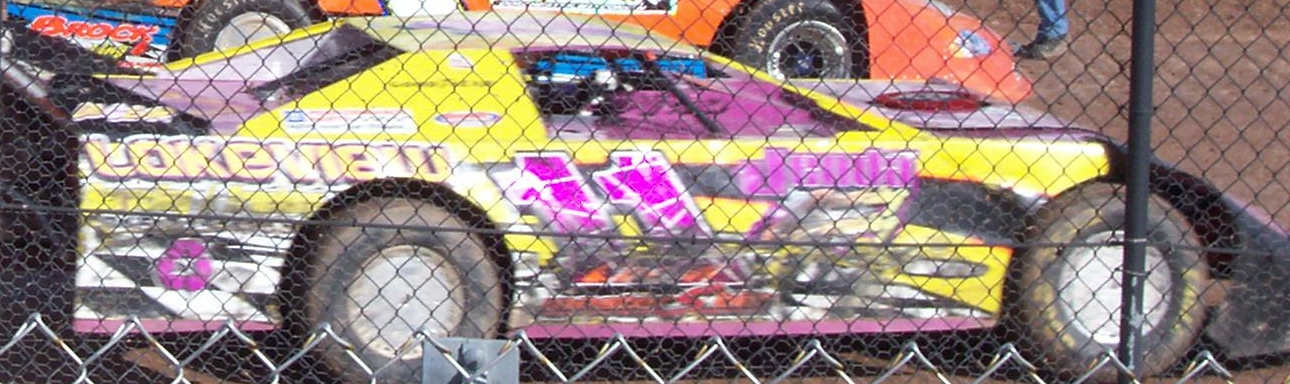
A Fastrak late model

Crate late models use Chevrolet small-block engine engines that have been sealed with a special tag. Typical motors include the GM 602 and GM 604 engines. Recently the GM CT525 crate has been a popular choice of racers and some after-market Ford motors have surfaced in competition. Crate engines are sealed at the intake manifold, cylinder head, front cover, and oil pan with special twist off bolts. Crate engines must not be altered, modified, or changed in any way from factory specifications.

Crate late models have three primarily Southern region touring series: the Durrence Layne Dirt Late Model Series, the United Crate Racing Alliance and the Fastrak Crate Late Model Series.

====== Popular late model racing series ======
- World of Outlaws Late Model Series
- Lucas Oil Late Model Dirt Series
- Southern All Star Racing Series (SAS)
- Southern Nationals/Spring Nationals
- International Motor Contest Association (IMCA)
- United Crate Racing Alliance (UCRA)
- United Midwestern Promoters (UMP)
- Mid America Racing Series (MARS)
- Midwest Late Model Racing Association (MLRA)
- United Late Model Association (ULMA)

There are hundreds of additional unsanctioned regional and national special events run throughout the year.

====== Major annual late model events ======
- Bama Brawl - AL: third weekend in February
- Ice Bowl - AL: first weekend after the new year
- Wild West Shootout - AZ: mid-January week plus of racing
- Winter Nationals - FL: week-long 2 tracks Tampa and Daytona leading to the Daytona 500)
- King of the Commonwealth - VA: early April
- Show-Me 100 - MO: Memorial Day weekend
- $100,000 Dream - OH: richest race of the year
- Firecracker 100 - PA: Prior to July 4 weekend
- Silver Dollar Nationals - NE: late July
- Prairie Dirt Classic - IL: last week July
- USA 100 - VA: not to be confused with the USA Nationals same weekend
- USA Nationals - WI: $50,000 3rd richest
- World 100
- North/South 100 - KY: $50,000 week after USA Nationals
- Topless 100 - AR: $40,000 3rd week in Aug
- HillBilly 100 - WV $25,000 richest one day race
- World 100 - OH: most prestigious race
- Knoxville Late Model Nationals - IA: $40,000
- Shootout - GA: formerly Hav-A-Tampa Shootout
- Pittsburgher - PA: early Oct.
- Blue-Gray 100 - SC: pivotal regional 25+ year event
- Dirt Track World Championship (DTWC) - OH: recently increased from $50K to $100,000
- World Finals - NC: Live prime time TV coverage of three series finals
- National 100 - AL: south's most prestigious race
- Turkey Bowl - MO: 3 days of racing action
- Gobbler - TN/GA: pivotal regional 25+ year event scheduled weekend before Thanksgiving
- Gateway Dirt Nationals - MO: indoor race featuring super late models, modifieds, and midgets

=== Motorcycles ===
Dirt and grass track bikes have capacities of 250, 350, 500 and in the solo classes and can reach speeds of up to 80 mph (130 km/h) on the straights and with no brakes fitted to the machine. The American Flat Track dirt track championship uses motorcycles of up to 750 cc capacities and can reach speeds of up to 130 mph (210 km/h).

There are three sidecar classes. The continental class has a 500 cc single-cylinder engine, also in Great Britain there are left- and right-handed sidecar machines with the engines up to 1000 cc. Sidecar races are some of the most exciting in Grass Track sport, with the driver and passenger working together to obtain the best grip and speed around the corners.

=== Vintage racing ===
Many obsolete race vehicles that were left in barns to rust are being restored to their former glory. The restored race vehicles are being displayed at car shows and sometimes raced. Cars that compete in vintage racing events are from the late 19th century to historic cars from a few years ago. There are more than 170 racing events in North America, and thousands of other vintage events sanctioned by hundreds of clubs.

== Race program ==
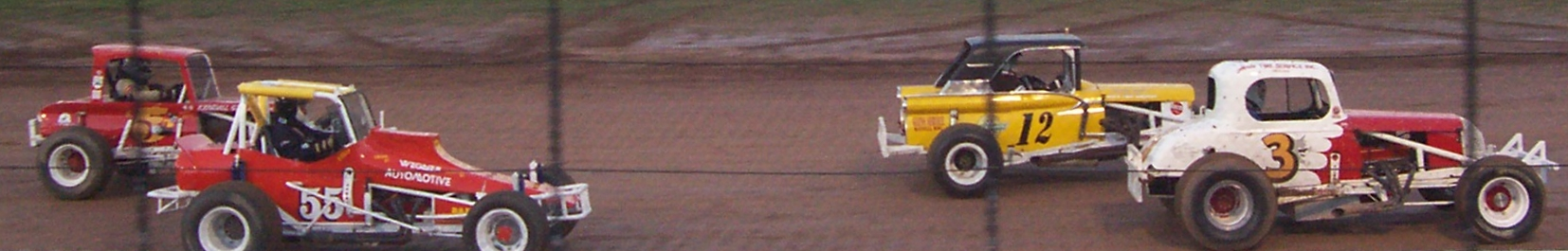
Four car heat race of vintage open wheel cars common in Wisconsin (USA) from the 1950s to 1970s

The typical race program usually involves a number of classes, and many tracks offer both open wheel and stock car racing. There are a wide variety of event formats.

=== Hot laps (warm up or practice) ===
These races are 2-5 laps for drivers to get an understanding of the track conditions and the set up of their race cars. They are at the very start of the night before qualifying and the heat races.

=== Qualifying ===
A qualifying session happens before the start of the event. The Lucas Oil Dirt Late Model Series and the World of Outlaw Late Models use the qualifying system to line up their heat races. They give each driver 2 timed laps to get their times. This system is also used to line up the big crown jewel events. For most of the regional series they use the method called the "pill draw." Before the races each driver draws a number and that determines where they start in their heat race. Recently the innovation of Transponder Scoring has brought dirt track racing into the internet immediate post "live" scoring and timing of events (Race Monitor).

=== Heat races ===
Preliminary races for each class, called heat races, frequently open the schedule. The heat races may determine the starting race position in the main events and usually earn season championship points. The heat races are shorter than the feature races, and not as many cars race in each heat, from 8 to 12 laps for a heat race. There are numerous formats for qualifying for the feature event.

In a race where they qualify to determine their starting position for the heat race they use a "heads up" system. This system is where there is a predetermined set of cars that go to the A feature from the heat race, usually either the top 3 or 4.

In a race where they use the pill draw to line up the heat races they use a method called passing points. In this system a driver receives a set number of points for where they finish, 1st-59 2nd-57 and so forth the lower they finish. To add to the points the driver gets for finishing, the driver also gets 1.5 points for each car they pass. They will then usually take the top 16 drivers with the highest total number of points and line up the A feature.

=== Semi-feature/B main/last chance showdown ===
There may be a semi-feature where unqualified racers may race their way into the remaining open starting positions in the A feature event. This race is called the last chance qualifier or B feature. The cars who did not make the A feature through the heat race or qualifying session get one more chance to qualify for the A feature through the B feature. The B length is anywhere up to circa 20 laps. Depending on how many B's there are determines how many transfer to the A, anywhere up to circa 6 will transfer. If a driver transfers through the B, they will start behind the drivers who made it through the heats / qualifying position.

At selected other races with a larger car count, there may be more "alphabet soup" features (C, D, E, F, etc.). In those cases the drivers in the lower feature race will race with a certain number who advances to the next higher feature (e.g. top two in the F advance to the E, etc.).

=== Feature/A main ===
The A feature or main feature race is held for each division. The top cars from the event compete in the race. The starting positions may be determined by the season's point standings, or by a combination of the heat/qualifying speed/trophy dash/semi-feature finishing positions. It is usually the longest race in the program and depending upon the division it may range from 10 laps to 50 laps. Points, a trophy, and frequently a purse are generally awarded, with the amount of each is determined by finishing position. The winner of the feature event is considered the winner of the event.

=== Special events ===
Many tracks have special events which tends to draw a larger crowd. Occasionally, a track will sponsor a "powder-puff" race to allow women the opportunity to drive racecars for a few laps of racing. Otherwise, woman racers may compete in the same events as the men.

Many tracks contract with a National and/or Regional touring racing association to schedule a sanctioned event. The racers in these events earn points for ranking within the series and sometimes the tracks points. The associations also usually require a guaranteed purse from the tracks of sanctioned events.

Some tracks also have a "run-what-you-brung" contest usually toward the beginning of the season. Spectator racing pits two drivers from the stands who, after signing waivers, can run their personal automobiles against each other in a one-on-one 1 or 2 lap shootout.

Dirt tracks tend to be somewhat more makeshift and more versatile than asphalt pavements, and can be converted for use in other motorsports. For instance, Little Valley Speedway in Little Valley, New York is a half-mile dirt track that can be converted into a figure 8 track, a demolition derby pit, or a tractor pull straightaway.

== Championships ==
Both the racetracks and the racing associations award championships as determined by the guidelines of the associated rulebooks. Awards, usually for the top ten racers in each class, may include a trophy, a jacket, and a monetary amount.

Track championships are awarded according to the points earned during the season. A certain number of points may be awarded for participation in an event and additional points added depending on the finish position in each race. The points earned at one track do not generally count toward another track's championship.

At dirt tracks sanctioned by NASCAR, drivers can compete against drivers from other NASCAR-sanctioned tracks, both paved and dirt, for the statewide and provincial Whelen All-American Series championship, where the best performer of the state and provincial champions will win the national championship. All Dirt late model drivers won NASCAR's first such championship in 1982, and these drivers have frequently won regional and national championships in the 30-year history of NASCAR's short track championship, which only applies for local racing divisions (non-touring).

The racing associations count points earned at the tracks for certain sponsored races similarly. Additionally they may promote the appearances of their drivers and winners at various other events.

== See also ==
- A.M.A. Grand National Championship
- Dirt track
- List of dirt track ovals in the United States
- National Dirt Late Model Hall of Fame
- List of dirt track ovals in Canada
- List of dirt track ovals in Australia
- Dirt track racing in New Zealand
- Australian Speedway Hall of Fame
