= Riverview League =

The Riverview League is a Class A men's amateur "Town Ball" baseball league in the Southwest Twin Cities metro area.

Riverview League is an example of Town Team Baseball that remains popular in Minnesota, Nebraska, North Dakota, South Dakota and Wisconsin. The Riverview League is one of four metro area leagues that make up Minnesota Baseball Association Class A.

== History ==
Established in 1987, Riverview League teams have a strong history of success. Minnetonka Millers have won the Class A State Tournament 15 times, including a championship game win over league rival St. Louis Park Pirates in 2017. St. Louis Park has claimed three titles (2002, 2008, 2018).

Bloomington Bulldogs claimed the first-ever league title in 1987 and would go on to win the MBA Class A championship defeating Columbia Heights 8–4 in the final. The Bulldogs (1987, 1988) and Richfield Ramblers (2005) are the only teams other than Minnetonka and St. Louis Park to win a league championship.

== Teams ==
Riverview League
| Team | Joined RVL | RVL titles | State titles | State appearances |
|---|---|---|---|---|
| Bloomington Bandits | 2006 | 0 | 0 | 10 |
| Edina Buckshots | 2017 | 0 | 0 | 0 |
| Hopkins Berries | 2000 | 0 | 0 | 6 |
| MacStrength Grizzlies | 2020 | 0 | 0 | 0 |
| Minnetonka Millers | 1987 | 26 | 15 | 33 |
| Northwest Orioles | 2014 | 0 | 0 | 2 |
| Plymouth Hitdawgs | 2012 | 0 | 0 | 0 |
| St. Louis Park | 1987 | 6 | 3 | 30 |

=== Former league member teams ===
- Bloomington Bulldogs
- Bloomington Redbirds
- Brooklyn Center Comets
- Brooklyn Park Hodags
- Eden Prairie Eagles
- Edina Buckshot
- Edina E-SOX
- Hamel Hawks (2017–20)
- Hort Hurricanes
- Maple Grove Crimson
- New Hope Athletics
- Northwest Suburban Red Hawks
- Park Center
- Richfield Ramblers
- Richfield Renegades
- South River Gnats
- Spring Lake Park
- St. Louis Park Atomic
- Westside Bombers

== League champions ==
| Season | Champion | State Tournament qualifiers |
|---|---|---|
| 1987 | **Bloomington Bulldogs** | |
| 1988 | Bloomington Bulldogs | |
| 1989 | Minnetonka Millers | |
| 1990 | Minnetonka Millers | |
| 1991 | Minnetonka Millers | |
| 1992 | Minnetonka Millers | |
| 1993 | Minnetonka Millers | |
| 1994 | St. Louis Park | |
| 1995 | Minnetonka Millers | |
| 1996 | Minnetonka Millers | |
| 1997 | **Minnetonka Millers** | |
| 1998 | **Minnetonka Millers** | |
| 1999 | **Minnetonka Millers** | |
| 2000 | Minnetonka Millers | Hopkins Berries, Bloomington Bulldogs |
| 2001 | **Minnetonka Millers** | Hopkins Berries, St. Louis Park |
| 2002 | Minnetonka Millers | **St. Louis Park**, Bloomington Bulldogs |
| 2003 | St. Louis Park | **Minnetonka Millers**, Bloomington Bulldogs |
| 2004 | **Minnetonka Millers** | Bloomington Bulldogs |
| 2005 | Richfield Ramblers | Minnetonka Millers, St. Louis Park |
| 2006 | **Minnetonka Millers** | St. Louis Park, Bloomington Bulldogs |
| 2007 | **Minnetonka Millers** | St. Louis Park, Hopkins Berries |
| 2008 | Minnetonka Millers | **St. Louis Park**, Hopkins Berries |
| 2009 | St. Louis Park | **Minnetonka Millers**, Bloomington Bandits |
| 2010 | **Minnetonka Millers** | St. Louis Park, Bloomington Bandits |
| 2011 | Minnetonka Millers | Bloomington Bandits, St. Louis Park |
| 2012 | **Minnetonka Millers** | St. Louis Park, Bloomington Bandits |
| 2013 | Minnetonka Millers | St. Louis Park, Bloomington Bandits |
| 2014 | Minnetonka Millers | St. Louis Park, Bloomington Bandits |
| 2015 | **Minnetonka Millers** | St. Louis Park, Northwest Orioles |
| 2016 | **Minnetonka Millers** | St. Louis Park, Bloomington Bandits |
| 2017 | St. Louis Park | **Minnetonka Millers**, Hopkins Berries |
| 2018 | Minnetonka Millers | **St. Louis Park**, Bloomington Bandits |
| 2019 | Minnetonka Millers | St. Louis Park, Hamel Hawks |
| 2020 | St. Louis Park | **Minnetonka Millers**, Bloomington Bandits, Northwest Orioles |
| 2021 | St. Louis Park | Minnetonka Millers, Hopkins Berries, Bloomington Bandits |

NOTE: state champion in bold
