= Men's Senior Baseball League =

United States amateur organization

The Men’s Senior Baseball League (MSBL)/Men’s Adult Baseball League (MABL) is a national organization in the United States, with 325 local affiliates, 3,200 teams, and 45,000 members who play organized amateur baseball in local leagues, 30 regional tournaments and six national tournaments.

== Profile ==
The Men's Senior Baseball League (MSBL) and Men's Adult Baseball League (MABL) is an amateur baseball league for adults 18 years of age and older. It was founded by Long Island, New York-based Steve Sigler in the 1980s with 60 members. He later established the MSBL/MABL World Series and Fall Classic, which take place, respectively in October in Arizona and November in Florida. There are also two tournaments held over Martin Luther King Jr. weekend in January: the MSBL/MABL Holiday Classic which is held at the Osceola Complex in Kissimmee, Florida, and the Desert Classic which takes place in Palm Springs, California. The Las Vegas Kickoff Classic is held in early to mid-March in Las Vegas, and the Las Vegas Open is held over Memorial Day. Local chapters hold regional tournaments over Memorial Day, Independence Day and Labor Day.

The MSBL/MABL divisions are ages 18 to 24, 25 to 34, 35 to 44, and 45 and over. Its World Series and Fall Classic also offer 48-plus, 58-plus, 65-plus, 70-plus and Father/Son Divisions. Commissioners and board members of the local leagues are not paid.

The MSBL/MABL generally conforms to standard baseball rules. Teams generally plays weekly, on Sundays

The national organization has 325 local leagues across the U.S. Membership in 1992 was 20,000, which by 2004 had grown to 45,000.
