= Cattaraugus County Fairgrounds =

Multi-purpose venue in New York, United States

Coordinates: 42.254919°N 78.806992°W

- Interactive map of Cattaraugus County Fairgrounds
- Former names: Little Valley Speedway
- Location: Little Valley, New York
- Owner: Cattaraugus County Agricultural Society
- Capacity: 2,300 grandstand Over 4,000 standing
- Scoreboard: Eggcrate

The Cattaraugus County Fairgrounds is a multi-purpose venue based in the village of Little Valley, New York, United States.

== Overview ==
The Cattaraugus County Agricultural Society obtained a "new" property 1870 with a half-mile track and a large exhibition hall, and the venue has since served as the site of the Cattaraugus County Fair each August. In 1924, the Agricultural Society sold the fairgrounds property to Cattaraugus County but repurchased it from the County Legislature in 1995.

The grounds has buildings available for conferences, receptions, reunions or meetings with room capacity of 400.

== Events ==
=== Cattaraugus County Fair ===
The first Cattaraugus County Fair was held in Ellicottville, New York, in 1842. After rotating to different towns and villages for many years the event permanently returned to the village of Little Valley in 1865. These grounds continue to host the namesake Fair, a week-long event offering a variety of food, animal exhibits, a petting zoo, and other entertainments. Main grandstand events typically include a monster truck rally, rodeo, demolition derby, and music concerts.

=== Livestock showing ===
The fairgrounds have two cow barns, a milking barn three horse stables, a horse exhibition arena, venues for exhibiting pigs, sheep, goats and poultry, and a domestics barn. The horse arena is used for shows throughout the summer. A Grange Hall was located on the premises before being replaced by more modern steel structures in the early 21st century.

=== Little Valley Speedway ===
From 1997 to 2017, the fairgrounds were used as Little Valley Speedway. The speedway promoted itself as the only half-mile dirt track in the region and is built as an originally unbanked oval track. Adjacent to the track is a 3,000 seat grandstand (the third-largest sporting venue in Cattaraugus County, behind 4,000 seat Bradner Stadium and 5,780 seat Reilly Center) with ample standing room, in front of which is a wider dirt patch (slightly larger than an American football field) to use for other motor sports, such as truck pulls. The track was configured in its current form in 1997. A 2012 renovation to the speedway partially replaced the dirt patch with an asphalt surface, banked the tracks, added fresh clay to the track and added additional bench seating in front of the grandstand to accommodate large, sometimes overflowing, crowds.

Predominant classes of dirt track racing include late models, super late models, super stocks, street stocks, sprint cars and modified cars (most commonly "E-Mod" class, but also 358 modified). Organizations who have raced at Little Valley Speedway on their circuits include the Bicknell Racing Products Can-Am Series, the United Late Model Series, the American Sprint Car Series, Patriot Sprints, the National Dirt Racing League Northeast Circuit, and the Empire Super Sprints. The World of Outlaws Late Model Series held races at the track in 2012 and 2013.

The number of events held at the racetrack declined beginning in the late 2000s; at its mid-2000s peak, seven or eight events would be held between Memorial Day and late September. Fewer races would be scheduled each year, and rainouts were increasingly used to cancel dates that were scheduled. The track suspended operations for the 2018 season and possibly beyond, with ownership blaming declining interest from racers, falling attendance, and competition from other tracks in the region making it difficult to find available dates that would not conflict with other tracks. By summer 2018, a portion of the track had been paved with asphalt; the remainder had begun to grow over with grass.

=== Other events ===
The Little Valley Gun Show is held each year in April and the Sportmans Rendezvous follows the Fair in August each year. Relay for Life established an event at the grounds in 2016.

Four demolition derbies are held at the track each year. The first is held every July 4 as part of the annual "Freedom Daze" celebration; the three others are during the Cattaraugus County Fair in early August. The last of these is labeled the "Western New York Championship" and determines who represents the county in the Great New York State Fair derby. One of the derbies features a school bus class, which is also paired with a short figure 8 race; these were discontinued after the 2009 fair but returned in 2013. Tractor pulling is a regular feature at the fairgrounds, with larger trucks using the main asphalt surface and tractors using the infield. The track also holds concerts, typically one or two country music acts during each county fair.
