= South Dakota Amateur Baseball Hall of Fame =

Sports hall of fame in South Dakota, U.S.

Coordinates: 44.580488°N 97.210304°W

The South Dakota Amateur Baseball Hall of Fame is a museum in Lake Norden, South Dakota.

The museum presents a pictorial history of amateur baseball in South Dakota as well as memorabilia from about a dozen South Dakotans who played Major League Baseball. It is described as the "pet project of USA TODAY baseball writer Mel Antonen," although Antonen is not involved in the day-to-day operations of the museum.

== Aim ==
The primary purpose of the museum is to relate the history of baseball in South Dakota through permanent exhibits of photographs, uniforms, bats, balls, gloves, and other memorabilia. The focus of displays is the development and accomplishments of South Dakotans who have participated in a number of different types and levels of amateur baseball including:

- High School Baseball
- College Baseball (NCAA and NAIA)
- American Legion Baseball
- Town Team Baseball

== Funding ==
The South Dakota Amateur Baseball Hall of Fame is supported by charitable contributions from visitors and by way of local fundraisers. It has not received significant financial support from professional baseball players.

== Location ==
The museum is located at 519 Main Street, Lake Norden, South Dakota 57248, and admission is free.

== See also ==
- List of museums in South Dakota
- Amateur baseball in the United States
- Baseball awards#U.S. amateur baseball
