= American Legion Baseball =

Amateur baseball league

- Sport: Baseball
- Founded: 1925
- First season: 1926; 100 years ago
- No. of teams: 3,786 (2016)
- Country: United States; Canada
- Venue: Shelby (Championship)
- Most recent champions: Chesapeake Post 280, Chesapeake, VA
- Most titles: Cincinnati, OH Post 50 (7)
- Broadcaster: ESPN3, ESPNU
- Website: http://legion.org/baseball

American Legion Baseball is a variety of amateur baseball played by 13-to-19-year-olds in all fifty states in the U.S. and Canada. More than 3,500 teams participate each year. The American Legion Department of South Dakota established the program in 1925 at Milbank, South Dakota.

According to the American Legion, the purpose of American Legion Baseball is to give players "an opportunity to develop their skills, personal fitness, leadership qualities, and to have more fun."

== History ==
The American Legion first sponsored a baseball league in 1925. In the first American Legion Baseball World Series, Yonkers, New York, Post 321 beat a team from Pocatello, Idaho, in Philadelphia in 1926. However, the inaugural season was expensive for the American Legion due to travel costs, and the subsequent season was cancelled. Commissioner Kenesaw Mountain Landis pledged a $50,000 annual donation from Major League Baseball, allowing Legion Baseball to resume in 1928. By 1929, teams participated from every state and the District of Columbia.

MLB has continued to support American Legion Baseball annually, although there is no formal partnership between the organizations.

== Hall of Fame alumni ==
Many American Legion players have been inducted into the Baseball Hall of Fame in Cooperstown, New York.

- 1962 – Bob Feller, P
- 1966 – Ted Williams, OF
- 1968 – Joe Medwick, OF
- 1969 – Stan Musial, OF/1B;
  Roy Campanella, C
- 1970 – Lou Boudreau, SS
- 1972 – Yogi Berra, C; Early Wynn, P
- 1973 – Warren Spahn, P
- 1975 – Ralph Kiner, OF
- 1976 – Robin Roberts, P; Bob Lemon, P
- 1978 – Eddie Mathews, 3B
- 1980 – Al Kaline, OF
- 1981 – Bob Gibson, P
- 1982 – Frank Robinson, OF
- 1983 – George Kell, 3B,
  Brooks Robinson, 3B
- 1984 – Don Drysdale, P; Harmon Killebrew, 1B/3B; Pee Wee Reese, SS
- 1985 – Hoyt Wilhelm, P
- 1986 – Bobby Doerr, 2B
- 1987 – Jim "Catfish" Hunter, P
- 1988 – Willie Stargell, OF
- 1989 – Johnny Bench, C; Carl Yastrzemski, OF/1B
- 1990 – Joe Morgan, 2B; Jim Palmer, P
- 1991 – Gaylord Perry, P
- 1992 – Rollie Fingers, P; Hal Newhouser, P; Tom Seaver, P
- 1993 – Reggie Jackson, OF
- 1994 – Steve Carlton, P
- 1995 – Richie Ashburn, OF
- 1996 – Jim Bunning, P; Earl Weaver, manager
- 1997 – Phil Niekro, P; Nellie Fox, 2B
- 1999 – George Brett, 3B; Robin Yount, SS/OF
- 2000 – Sparky Anderson, manager; Carlton Fisk, C
- 2001 – Dave Winfield, OF
- 2003 – Gary Carter, C; Eddie Murray, 1B
- 2004 – Paul Molitor, SS
- 2005 – Ryne Sandberg, 2B; Wade Boggs, 3B
- 2006 – Bruce Sutter, P
- 2007 – Tony Gwynn, OF
- 2008 – Dick Williams, manager
- 2009 – Joe Gordon, 2B; Jim Rice, OF
- 2010 – Whitey Herzog, manager; Doug Harvey, umpire
- 2011 – Roberto Alomar, 2B; Bert Blyleven, P; Pat Gillick, administrator
- 2012 – Ron Santo, 3B; Barry Larkin, SS
- 2014 – Bobby Cox, manager; Tom Glavine, P; Tony LaRussa, manager; Greg Maddux, P; Joe Torre, manager
- 2016 – Mike Piazza, C
- 2017 – Jeff Bagwell, 1B; Tim Raines, OF, Iván Rodríguez, C; John Schuerholz, executive
- 2018 – Alan Trammell, SS; Jack Morris, P; Chipper Jones, 3B
- 2019 – Lee Smith, P; Mike Mussina, P; Roy Halladay, P, Harold Baines, OF
- 2020 – Ted Simmons, C
- 2022 – Gil Hodges, 1B
- 2023 – Fred McGriff, 1B; Scott Rolen, 3B
- 2024 – Jim Leyland, MGR; Joe Mauer, C/1B
- 2025 – CC Sabathia, P
- 2026 – Jeff Kent, 2B

== Other notable American Legion alumni ==
- Jackie Bradley Jr.
- Alex Bregman
- Kris Bryant
- Madison Bumgarner
- Steve Cishek
- Roger Clemens
- Jacob deGrom
- Brian Dozier
- Todd Frazier
- Alex Gordon
- Bryce Harper
- Ken Hill
- Matt Holliday
- Tommy John
- Craig Kimbrel
- Roger Maris
- Don Mattingly
- Dayton Moore
- Dale Murphy
- Wil Myers
- Brandon Nimmo
- Rick Porcello
- Albert Pujols
- Max Scherzer
- Corey Seager
- Gary Sheffield
- Ed Sprague Jr.
- Tim Stoddard
- Hal Stowe
- Mark Teixeria
- Justin Verlander
- Michael Wacha
- Alex Rodriguez
- Steve Avery

== World Series ==
In 2011, Shelby, North Carolina was named the permanent home of the American Legion World Series after decades of rotating venues for the event.

The format of the tournament for the eight teams involves separating into two pools and playing round robin within that pool from Thursday to Sunday. The top seed in each pool plays the runner-up in the other pool in the semifinals on Monday, with the two teams advancing to a one-game championship on Tuesday.

With games set at Keeter Stadium on the campus of Shelby High School, the local community has rallied around the event, turning it into a lengthy celebration including the Seventh Inning Stretch festival in Uptown Shelby the Saturday prior to the World Series, a Commander's Reception the Tuesday before the event and a Parade of Champions the night prior to the first game.

All games are streamed online on ESPN3, with games Sunday, Monday and Tuesday broadcast nationally on ESPNU.

== National champions ==
=== 1926–1959 ===
- 1926 – Yonkers, NY 321
- 1927 – No tournament
- 1928 – Oakland, CA 5
- 1929 – Buffalo, NY 721
- 1930 – Baltimore, MD 81
- 1931 – Chicago, IL 493
- 1932 – New Orleans, LA
- 1933 – Chicago, IL
- 1934 – Cumberland, MD 13
- 1935 – Gastonia, NC 23
- 1936 – Spartanburg, SC 28
- 1937 – East Lynn, MA 291
- 1938 – San Diego, CA 6
- 1939 – Omaha, NE 1
- 1940 – Albemarle, NC 76
- 1941 – San Diego, CA 6
- 1942 – Los Angeles 357
- 1943 – Richfield, MN 435
- 1944 – Cincinnati, OH 50
- 1945 – Shelby, NC 82
- 1946 – New Orleans, LA 125
- 1947 – Cincinnati, OH 50
- 1948 – Trenton, NJ 93
- 1949 – Oakland, CA 337
- 1950 – Oakland, CA 337
- 1951 – Los Angeles 715
- 1952 – Cincinnati, OH 50
- 1953 – Yakima, WA 36-
- 1954 – San Diego, CA 492
- 1955 – Cincinnati, OH 216
- 1956 – St. Louis, MO 245
- 1957 – Cincinnati, OH 50
- 1958 – Cincinnati, OH 50
- 1959 – Detroit, MI 187

=== 1960–1999 ===
- 1960 – New Orleans, LA 125
- 1961 – Phoenix, AZ 1
- 1962 – St. Louis, MO 299
- 1963 – Long Beach, CA 27
- 1964 – Upland, CA 73
- 1965 – Charlotte, NC 9
- 1966 – Oakland, CA 337
- 1967 – Tuscaloosa, AL 34
- 1968 – Memphis, TN 1
- 1969 – Portland, OR 105
- 1970 – West Covina, CA 790
- 1971 – West Covina, CA 790
- 1972 – Ballwin, MO 611
- 1973 – Rio Piedras, PR 146
- 1974 – Rio Piedras, PR 146
- 1975 – Yakima, WA 36
- 1976 – Santa Monica, CA 123
- 1977 – South Bend, IN 50
- 1978 – Hialeah, FL 32
- 1979 – Yakima, WA 36
- 1980 – Honolulu, HI
- 1981 – West Tampa, FL 248
- 1982 – Boyertown, PA 471
- 1983 – Edina, MN 471
- 1984 – Guaynabo, PR 134
- 1985 – Midlothian, VA 186
- 1986 – Jensen Beach, FL 126
- 1987 – Boyertown, PA 471
- 1988 – Cincinnati, OH 507
- 1989 – Woodland Hills, CA 826
- 1990 – Mayo, MD 226
- 1991 – Brooklawn, NJ 72
- 1992 – Newbury Park, CA
- 1993 – Rapid City, SD 22
- 1994 – Miami, FL 346
- 1995-Bellevue WA lakeside ( no post)
- 1996 – Yardley, PA 317
- 1997 – Sanford, FL Post 53
- 1998 – Edwardsville, IL Post 199
- 1999 – New Brighton, MN Post 513

=== 2000–present ===
- 2000 – Danville, CA Post 246
- 2001 – Brooklawn, NJ Post 72
- 2002 – West Point, MS Post 212
- 2003 – Rochester, MN Post 92
- 2004 – Portland, ME
- 2005 – Enid, OK Post 4
- 2006 – Metairie, LA Post 175
- 2007 – Columbia, TN Post 19
- 2008 – Las Vegas, NV Post 76
- 2009 – Midland, MI Post 165
- 2010 – Midwest City, OK Post 170
- 2011 – Eden Prairie, MN
- 2012 – New Orleans, LA Post 125
- 2013 – Brooklawn, NJ Post 72
- 2014 – Brooklawn, NJ Post 72
- 2015 – Chapin-Newberry, SC Post 193
- 2016 – Texarkana, AR Post 58
- 2017 – Henderson, NV Post 40
- 2018 – Wilmington, DE Post 1
- 2019 – Idaho Falls, ID Post 56
- 2020 – Tournament cancelled due to the coronavirus pandemic
- 2021 – Idaho Falls, ID Post 56
- 2022 – Troy, AL Post 70
- 2023 – League City, TX Post 554
- 2024 – Troy, AL Post 70
- 2025 – Chesapeake, VA Post 280
- 2026 – Lincoln, NE Post 500

== State, sectional and regional tournaments ==
Previously, all 50 state champions, eight host sites, and the runners up from the six states with the most teams enrolled advance to the regional tournaments.

Beginning with the 2026 regional tournaments, runners-up from the states with the most teams enrolled no longer advanced to regional play. Only the state champions (minus Georgia), Puerto Rico, and the six host sites (two regions share the same host site) would advance to regional play.

- Region 1 (Northeast) – Maine, Massachusetts, New Hampshire, Rhode Island, Vermont
- Region 2 (Mid-Atlantic) – Connecticut, Delaware, Maryland, New Jersey, New York, Pennsylvania
- Region 3 (Southeast) – Florida, North Carolina, Ohio, Puerto Rico, South Carolina, Virginia, West Virginia
- Region 4 (Mid-South) – Alabama, Arkansas, Louisiana, Mississippi, Oklahoma, Tennessee
- Region 5 (Great Lakes) – Illinois, Indiana, Kansas, Kentucky, Michigan, Missouri, Wisconsin
- Region 6 (Central Plains) – Iowa, Minnesota, Nebraska, North Dakota, South Dakota
- Region 7 (Northwest) – Alaska, Hawaii, Idaho, Montana, Oregon, Washington, Wyoming
- Region 8 (Western) – Arizona, California, Colorado, Nevada, New Mexico, Texas, Utah

== Awards ==
See footnotes.

- American Legion Graduate of the Year: "A Major League Baseball player, who is an American Legion Baseball alumnus, is honored each year with the American Legion Graduate of the Year award. The award recognizes character, leadership, playing abilities and community service."
- George W. Rulon Player of the Year: "The award is based on integrity, mental attitude, cooperation, citizenship, sportsmanship, scholastic aptitude and general good conduct."
- American Legion Batting Champion: Awarded "to the player with the highest batting average during national competition." (previously sponsored by Louisville Slugger)
- American Legion Big Stick Award: Presented "to the player who rounds the most bases in regional and national competition." (previously sponsored by Rawlings)
- Dr. Irvin L. "Click" Cowger RBI Memorial Award: Awarded to the player who "is credited with the most runs batted in at the regional tournament and World Series."
- Bob Feller Pitching Award: Presented to the pitcher "with the most strikeouts in regional and national competition."
- James F. Daniel Jr. Memorial Sportsmanship Award: Presented "to a player who participates in the Legion World Series and best embodies the principles of good sportsmanship."
- Jack Williams Memorial Leadership Award: Presented by "the Department of North Dakota ... to the manager and coach of the national championship team as outstanding representatives of adult leadership."

== See also ==
- Amateur baseball in the United States
- Baseball awards § U.S. youth baseball
- South Dakota Amateur Baseball Hall of Fame
