= Little Valley (village), New York =

Little Valley, New York Seneca: Nigáhadá’s’a:h
- Village
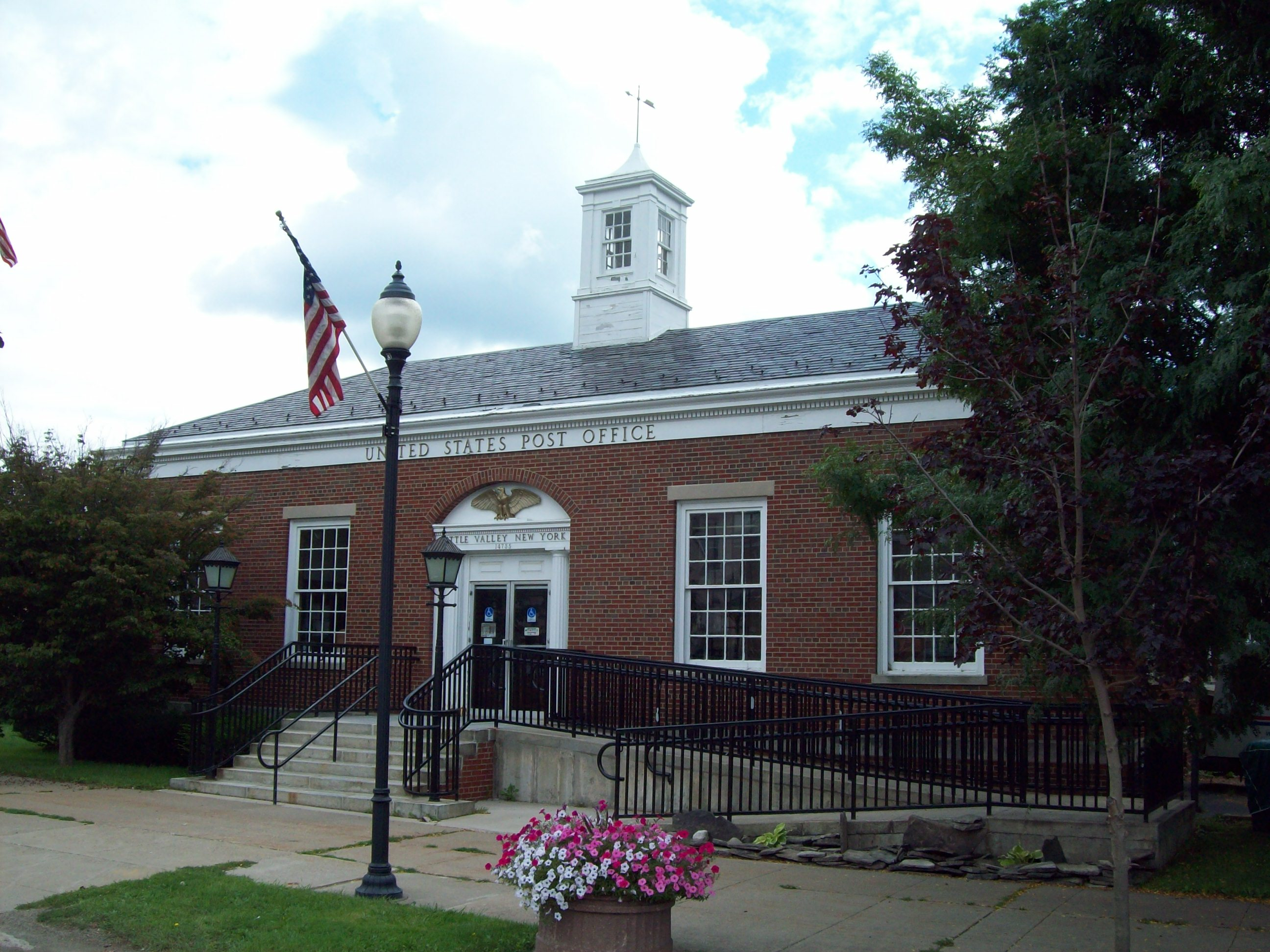
- The village's post office

- Location within the state of New York
- Coordinates: 42°14′58″N 78°47′59″W
- Country: United States
- State: New York
- County: Cattaraugus
- Town: Little Valley
- Incorporated: 1870

Government
  - Mayor: Jim Bowen (I)

Area
  - Total: 1.00 sq mi (2.60 km^{2})
  - Land: 1.00 sq mi (2.60 km^{2})
  - Water: 0 sq mi (0.00 km^{2})
- Elevation: 1,598 ft (487 m)

Population (2020)
  - Total: 1,058
  - Density: 1,055.9/sq mi (407.67/km^{2})
- Time zone: UTC−5 (Eastern (EST))
  - Summer (DST): UTC−4 (EDT)
- ZIP code: 14755
- Area code: 716
- FIPS code: 36-42829
- GNIS feature ID: 0955720
- Phone exchange: 938
- Website: www.villageoflittlevalley.gov

Little Valley (Seneca: Nigáhadá’s’a:h) is a village and the county seat of Cattaraugus County, New York, United States. It is the location of the county fair (held in August in the fairgrounds north of the village). The village is in the northwest corner of the town of Little Valley, which is north of Salamanca. The village population was 1,084 at the 2020 census, out of a population of 1,740 within the entire town.

The village's name is a relative comparison of two tributaries (the other being the neighboring Great Valley) of the Allegheny River.

== History ==
Prior to 1868, the village of Ellicottville was the county seat, but the presence of a railroad line in Little Valley prompted a move. The village of Little Valley was incorporated in 1876. The railroad line shut down around 1990.

The Little Valley post office and Civil War Memorial Building are both listed on the National Register of Historic Places.

Ira Joe Fisher, a daytime television personality and weather reporter, spent most of his childhood in Little Valley.

== Politics and government ==
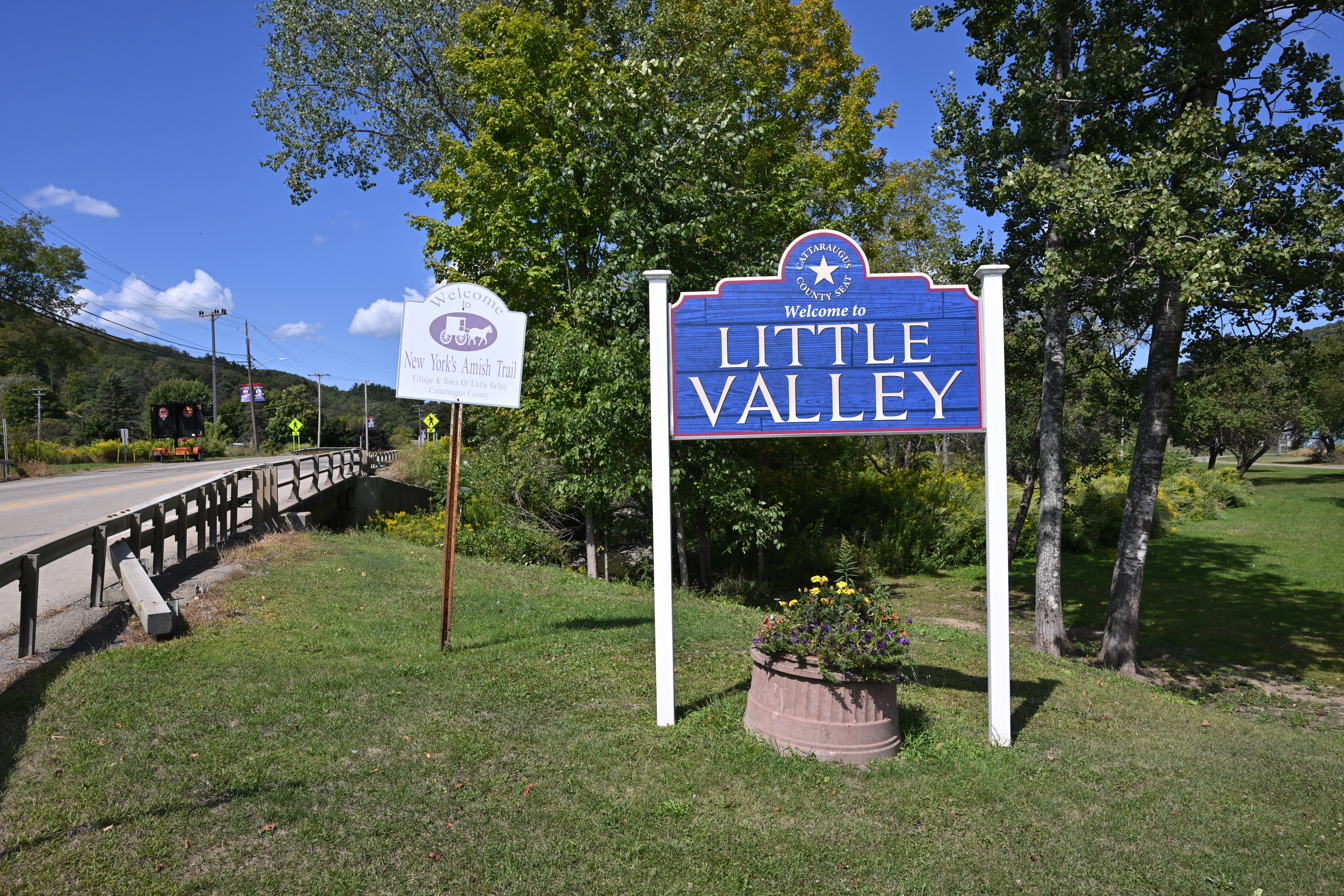
Little Valley welcome sign, Cattaraugus County, NY

The village is operated by a village board that consists of a mayor, a deputy mayor, and three trustees. All serve four-year terms, and most of the board is up for re-election in the same year, meaning that two to three years can pass without any village board seats up for election.

The mayor of Little Valley is Jim Bowen, an independent. Bowen upset Norman Marsh, the longtime incumbent Republican mayor, in an election in March 2019; Bowen's term as mayor runs through March 2023. The village board consists of a deputy mayor and three other trustees, all elected at-large.

=== Public services ===
Fire service is provided through a local volunteer fire department, in operation since 1888. As of 2016, ambulance services are typically outsourced. Police services are provided directly by the Cattaraugus County Sheriff's Office.

Little Valley offers its own municipal electric service, through an affiliation with National Grid (formerly Niagara Mohawk), as well as municipal water, sewer, and streets departments.

== Geography ==
The village of Little Valley is located in the northwest part of the town of Little Valley at 42°14′58″N 78°47′59″W (42.249555, -78.799775).

According to the United States Census Bureau, the village has a total area of 1.0 square mile (2.6 km^{2}), all land.

Little Valley Creek, a tributary of the Allegheny River, flows past the northeast side of the village. A smaller creek, Lees Hollow, flanks Little Valley Creek on the southern side of the village. Another creek without a name flows through the middle of the Village. Historical records and maps do not indicate a name for this creek.

State routes NY-242 and NY-353 converge at the village. County Routes 5 and 14 enter the village from the north.

Bus service is provided to the village by Coach USA (on its Jamestown to New York City line) and the Seneca Transit System (on its Buffalo to Highbanks line).

The Pat McGee Trail runs through Little Valley and has a major stop at a former rail depot (now a pavilion) in the village.

== Demographics ==
Historical population
Census	Pop.	Note	%±
1880	566		—
1890	698		23.3%
1900	1,085		55.4%
1910	1,368		26.1%
1920	1,253		−8.4%
1930	1,196		−4.5%
1940	1,234		3.2%
1950	1,287		4.3%
1960	1,244		−3.3%
1970	1,340		7.7%
1980	1,203		−10.2%
1990	1,188		−1.2%
2000	1,130		−4.9%
2010	1,143		1.2%
2020	1,084		−5.2%
2021 (est.)	1,074		−0.9%
U.S. Decennial Census

As of the census of 2000, there were 1,130 people, 427 households, and 266 families residing in the village. The population density was 1,127.3 inhabitants per square mile (435.3/km^{2}). There were 513 housing units at an average density of 511.8 per square mile (197.6/km^{2}). The racial makeup of the village was 95.58% White, 1.86% Black or African American, 0.80% Native American, 0.09% from other races, and 1.68% from two or more races. Hispanic or Latino of any race were 1.77% of the population.

There were 427 households, out of which 32.3% had children under the age of 18 living with them, 43.8% were married couples living together, 13.1% had a female householder with no husband present, and 37.7% were non-families. 32.6% of all households were made up of individuals, and 18.0% had someone living alone who was 65 years of age or older. The average household size was 2.37 and the average family size was 2.99.

In the village, the age distribution of the population shows 25.0% under the age of 18, 9.6% from 18 to 24, 31.7% from 25 to 44, 18.5% from 45 to 64, and 15.1% who were 65 years of age or older. The median age was 36 years. For every 100 females, there were 110.8 males. For every 100 females age 18 and over, there were 107.1 males.

The median income for a household in the village was $28,750, and the median income for a family was $31,875. Males had a median income of $27,500 versus $20,962 for females. The per capita income for the village was $14,458. About 11.2% of families and 15.5% of the population were below the poverty line, including 18.7% of those under age 18 and 7.4% of those age 65 or over.

== Culture ==
=== Local commerce ===
Little Valley's main attraction is the Cattaraugus County Fairgrounds, the site of the annual county fair each August. It has historically hosted an annual "Freedom Daze" Fourth of July festival, horse shows and other miscellaneous events, and from 1997 to the late 2010s, operated as Little Valley Speedway, a motorsports stadium.

In 2001, the Little Valley Area Chamber of Commerce was founded. They host events such "Cheers to Little Valley" and sponsor "Christmas on Main Street". A Friends of Little Valley committee, also operating as Little Valley Happenings, formed in the early 2020s promoting community events in the village.

No national chain franchises operate in the village of Little Valley. Its storefront businesses as of 2024 include a convenience store, hardware store, two taverns, a laundromat, a regional bank, a credit union, a Chrysler/Dodge automobile dealership, an auto repair and collision shop, an insurance agency, and two hair salons.

=== Media ===
Two radio stations, weather radio WWG32 (162.425) and Family Life Network owned-and-operated station WCGS, are licensed to the village. WWG32 is based at the National Weather Service offices at Buffalo Niagara International Airport in Cheektowaga. WCGS operated as commercially-supported classic hits station WGWE from its 2010 launch until 2021, before being sold to Family Life.

Little Valley is part of the Buffalo television market. Due to the hilly terrain, strong rooftop directional antennae are required to receive over-the-air television since the digital transition in 2009. Breezeline is the local cable provider, with wireline high-speed internet available through them or Armstrong, which began servicing Little Valley in the early 2020s through an existing but abandoned fiber-optic cable, thereby ending Breezeline and its predecessors' long monopoly over broadband in the village.

=== Historical business ===
The cutlery industry was a major driver of the village of Little Valley's early economy. Cattaraugus Cutlery Company was the last surviving knife manufacturer in the village; it remained there until closing its doors in 1963, with its factory remaining standing and vacant until its destruction in a 2015 fire. W. R. Case & Sons Cutlery Co. was spun off from Cattaraugus in 1905, and that company remains in business, now based in Bradford, Pennsylvania.

Three weekly newspapers have operated out of Little Valley; the first was the Cattaraugus Republican (founded 1867, originally based in Ellicottville, but later acquired by the Salamanca Press), the second was The Little Valley Hub (operated from 1881 to 1968), and the most recent was the County Chronicle, which printed from 1992 to 2007, with some of the earlier years being based in Salamanca.

The Crosby's convenience store chain was founded in Little Valley in 1966, where its first store opened. The store was sold to a Lockport-based company in 2006, which used the Crosby's name for all of its stores after the purchase. Crosby's continues to have a store in Little Valley; its original location, a Quonset hut, has since been decommissioned.

Bush Industries operated a factory in the village from its founding in 1959 until it closed in 2007. The company remained in business at a facility in Jamestown until it went out of business in 2026. The local grocery store, originally an A&P in the 1960s and locally operated as Brooks Market from 1972 to 2017, went out of business during the retail apocalypse in January 2018.

=== Religion ===
Four churches operate within the village bounds: a Wesleyan Church, a congregational church, an independent Methodist church (Bridge of Hope, which separated from the United Methodist Church circa 2023), and a King James Only Independent Baptist church (Grace Bible Baptist). The village is also served by various churches surrounding the village in the towns of Little Valley and Mansfield.

The local Catholic Church, St. Mary's, closed in the late 2000s as part of the church's overall U.S. downsizing effort, and all of its congregation was directed to the identically named St. Mary's Roman Catholic Church in Cattaraugus. The Lutherans also had a church in the village that was closed shortly after the closure of St. Mary's; its church building is now owned by Grace Bible Baptist.

=== Education ===
Public school students attend Cattaraugus-Little Valley Central School in Cattaraugus. Little Valley Central School operated in the village until 2000, shortly after voters approved a merger with Cattaraugus Central School. The district continued to operate an elementary school in the village until 2012 when it was controversially closed. The former school building is currently used by the county for offices it cannot accommodate at the county center; the former school's alumni association maintains a small museum in one of the rooms.

Grace Christian Academy, which is affiliated with Grace Bible Baptist, operates a small private Christian school in the village.

=== Sports and recreation ===
Little Valley features teams in Little League Baseball and softball, as well as youth soccer. The Valley Thunder baseball club represented the village in Town Team Baseball in 2014, playing its games in Cattaraugus due to the lack of a regulation field in the village or town of Little Valley. The Thunder folded in 2015; that year and the next, a slow-pitch softball team represented the village in a local league also based in Cattaraugus.

The village supported the Little Valley Panthers youth football squad. Through 2014, the team played and practiced in Little Valley; in 2015, it was forced to move its games to Cattaraugus, and in 2016, the team was merged with Cattaraugus's.

The village has three public parks: a small unnamed park in the center of the village, Bicentennial Park on the village's west side adjacent to the County Center, and Eric Peters Memorial Park on the east side of the village. Memorial Park encompasses a public swimming pool, a walking trail, beach volleyball court and Little League Baseball diamond. An additional state-owned park and pavilion is located on the Pat McGee Trail. The Lyle Underwood Memorial facility includes a weight room and, when weather permits, an ice skating pond; the weight room was dismantled after a private investor opened up a commercial gym elsewhere in the village in 2023.
