= Semi-professional sports =

Sports with part-time athletes

Semi-professional sports are sports in which athletes are not participating on a full-time basis, but still receive some payment. Semi-professionals are not amateur because they receive regular payment from their team, but generally at a considerably lower rate than a full-time professional athlete. As a result, semi-professional players frequently have (or seek) full-time employment elsewhere. A semi-pro player or team could also be one that represents a place of employment that only the employees are allowed to play in. In this case, it is considered semi-pro because their employer pays them, but for their regular job, not for playing on the company's team.

The semi-professional status is not universal throughout the world and depends on each country's labour code and each sports organization's specific regulations.

== Origin ==
The San Francisco Olympic Club fielded an American football team in 1890. That year, the Olympic Club was accused by a rival club of enticing athletes to jump to its ranks with offers of jobs. An investigation by the Amateur Athletic Union ruled that the Olympics' practice was not actually professionalism but only a "semi" form of it, inventing the term "semi-pro". Although the Amateur Athletic Union did not like the idea very much, it decided that clubs could indeed offer employment without losing their amateur status or compromising the athlete.

== North America ==
In North America, semi-professional athletes and teams were far more common in the early and mid-20th century than they are today. Large blue-collar employers such as factories and shipyards often fielded baseball and basketball teams, with players receiving full-time salaries comparable to other employees. In theory, such players split their work week between athletic training and the normal duties of the company's employees, though highly competitive teams often evolved into "sponsored" squads which trained for sports full-time and only nominally worked in the factory. The National Industrial Basketball League evolved out of these company-branded basketball teams. By the 1940s, baseball split off into separate truly amateur softball teams, sometimes sponsored by employers, and an expanded system of fully professionalized minor leagues whose lower ranks included many former industrial players. The top levels of Town team baseball are or were semi-professional, although the AA level has priced itself out of existence.

There are many benefits, such as collegiate eligibility and the attendant scholarships, in maintaining amateur status (unlike the Amateur Athletic Union, the NCAA forbade any sort of compensation outside of scholarships, including job offers tied to their playing, until 2020). Eligibility for participation in the Olympics in some sports is still dependent upon maintaining a purely amateur status (although far less so than was previously the case), and such athletes may be supported by government money, business sponsorships, and other systems. At the same time, professional sports have become such a massive and remunerative business that even many low-level feeder teams can afford to have fully professional athletes.

In Canada, semi-professionalism is prevalent in junior ice hockey, in which the top level players (most of whom are teenagers still in, or just out of, high school) are paid at a semi-professional level. This is not the case in the United States, where college ice hockey dominates at that age group; the junior leagues in the United States generally operate as fully amateur teams to maintain the players' eligibility to play in college.

Lower-end minor leagues and more obscure sports often operate at a semi-professional level due to cost concerns. Because the cost of running a fully professional American football team is prohibitive, semi-pro football is common at the adult levels, in the outdoor or indoor variety, providing an outlet for players who have used up their NCAA eligibility and have no further use for maintaining amateur status. As a sport that normally plays only one game per week, American football is especially suited for semi-pro play and commonly known as "working man's" football; meaning the players have regular jobs and play football on the weekends. In the 20th century the term "semi-pro football league" refer to higher level amateur leagues, though the players do not get paid, the leagues and the games are run in a somewhat professional manner.

The National Lacrosse League, whose teams also typically play only one game per week, pays a salary that is enough to be considered fully professional, but players also are able to pursue outside employment to supplement their income. The lowest levels of organized baseball are also effectively semi-professional, as the short summer seasons and low salaries require players to hold jobs in the offseason to make ends meet.

== United Kingdom ==
There are several hundred semi-professional football teams at non-League level. The bottom division of the English Football League (the fourth tier of the English football league system) has traditionally been the cut-off point between professional ("full-time") and semi-professional ("part-time") in English football. However, many teams in the top non-League competition, the National League, have become "full-time" professional clubs in an effort to achieve League status. Many former League clubs also remain as fully professional teams following relegation to the lower leagues at least for as long as they retain a large enough average attendance to generate the income needed to pay the players.

Women's football in England is nominally semi-professional from the second tier downwards, although all teams competing in the top two leagues are currently professional.

In Scottish football, semi-professional teams compete at all levels below the Scottish Premiership, with most teams below the second-level Scottish Championship being semi-professional.

Historically, English rugby league and rugby union have had one full-time professional division, with semi-professional divisions at the next level down. The second tier of union, the RFU Championship, became fully professional beginning with the 2009–10 season.

== See also ==
- Professional sports
- Amateur sports
- Pro–am
- High performance sport
- Women's professional sports
