= Amateur baseball in the United States =

United States baseball

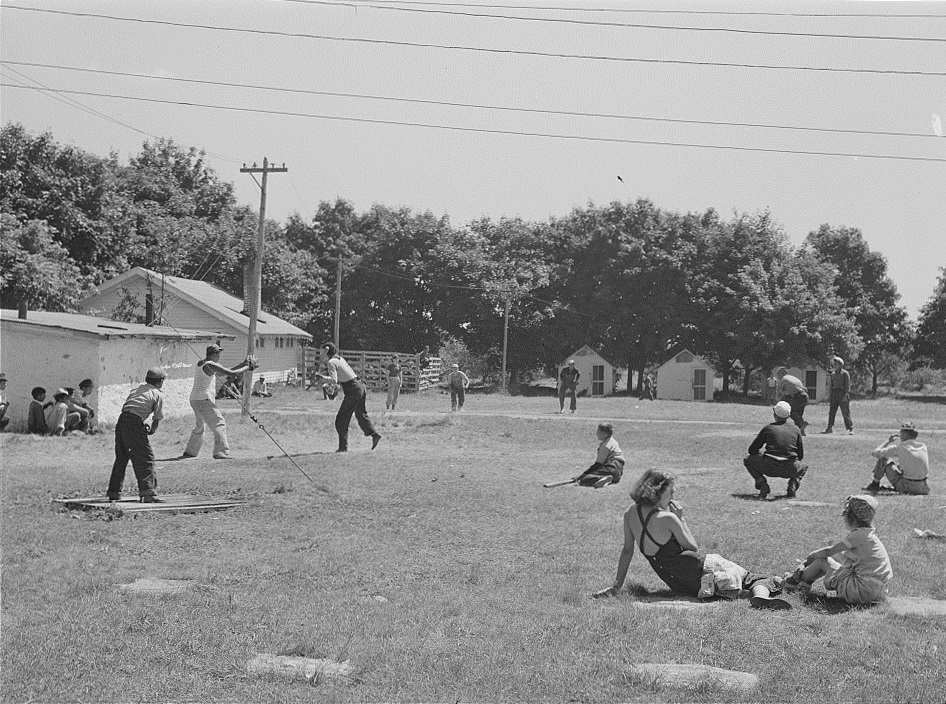
Cherry pickers playing baseball at an orchard work camp in Door County, Wisconsin in July 1940

Amateur baseball is baseball in which the players either are not paid for playing, or (as in Town Team Baseball) receive only a modest stipend or employment arranged by the team's boosters. Amateur baseball is played in the United States by players of all ages, from young children to adults.

== Varieties ==
Leagues for various skill levels and age groups exist throughout the US. In ascending order of age participation, here are a few examples:

=== Youth baseball ===
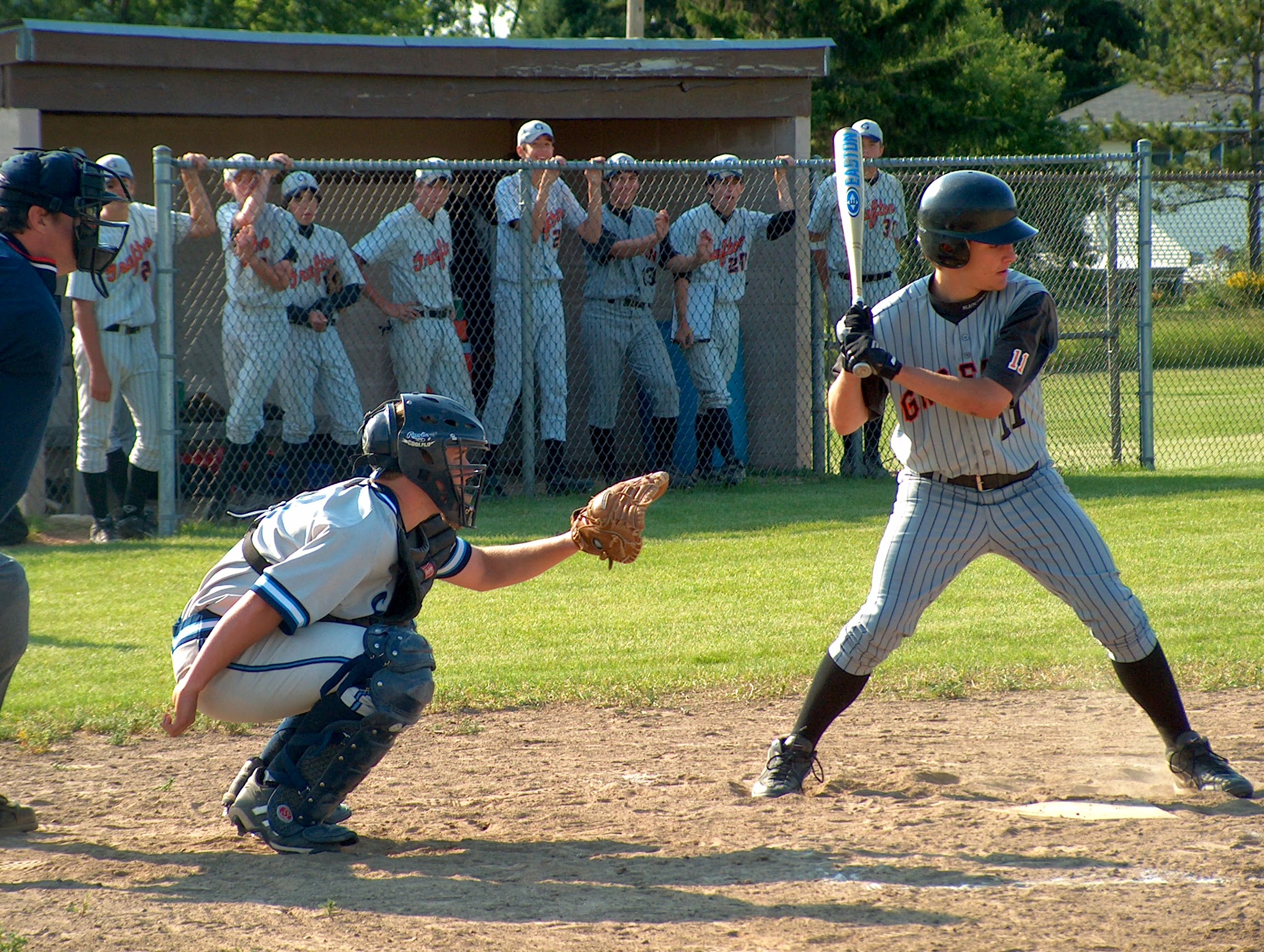
A batter at the plate at Grafton High School in Wisconsin

Youth baseball is played by elementary-school-age and high-school-age children of both genders. Of the various leagues listed below, Little League baseball is the most widespread. The Little League World Series in Williamsport, Pennsylvania, draws participants from around the world and is televised in the US on ESPN.

- American Amateur Youth Baseball Alliance known as AAYBA (World Series in Flower Mound Texas with over 300 teams participating ages 7–14 Founded in 1989)
- American Legion Baseball (ages 13–19)
- Babe Ruth League (ages 13–18)
  - Cal Ripken Baseball (a division of Babe Ruth League, Inc.) (ages 5–12)
- Little League Baseball (including Little, Intermediate, Junior, and Senior League) (ages 5–16)
- PONY Baseball and Softball (ages 5–18)
- Sam Bat Fall League Baseball (ages 12 to 18) Wood-bat fall leagues designed to help players develop their skills. Leagues are sponsored by Sam Bat.
- USSSA Baseball (ages 8U to 14U)
- American Amateur Baseball Congress (AABC) is for players above junior-baseball age. It provides progressive and continuous organized competition from pre-teens to adults. National tournament play is organized by leagues, with successful teams advancing to higher levels of tournament play, instead of the "all-star" procedure used by Little League Baseball.

==== National Youth Baseball Championship ====
See footnote

The first annual National Youth Baseball Championships (NYBC) tournament was held in August 2008 for players in two divisions: 10U and 12U. The purpose of the tournament is to recognize one team as the "National Youth Baseball Champion." The tournament organizer is the Major Youth Baseball Alliance, LLC, which was formed by eight major national youth baseball organizations, whose programs have more than eight million participants. The eight organizations are: AABC (American Amateur Baseball Congress), AAU (Amateur Athletic Union of the United States), Babe Ruth Baseball, Dixie Youth Baseball, NABF (National Amateur Baseball Federation), Pony Baseball, Super Series Baseball of America, and USSSA (United States Specialty Sports Association).

2008

- 12U Youth Majors NYB champions: Juice 12s (Orlando, Florida) (AAU)
- 10U Youth Majors NYB champions: Tomateros de California (Paramount, California) (USSSA)

2009

- 12U Youth Majors NYB champions: Team Rattlers (Spring, Texas) (Super Series)
- 10U Youth Majors NYB champions: N. Texas Bulldogs (AAU)

2010

2011

- 12U Youth Majors NYB champions: Banditos Black (Tomball, Texas) (Super Series)
- 10U Youth Majors NYB champions: Oakley Stingrays (Norwalk, California) (USSSA)

==== National all-stars tournament ====
From 1998 (or earlier) through 2010 (or later), there has been an annual, national all-stars tournament each June — the USA Baseball Tournament of Stars; its predecessor was the National Amateur All-Star Baseball Tournament (NAABT). The tournament features the top 16- to 18-year-old players from various baseball organizations, including the American Amateur Baseball Congress (AABC), American Legion, Babe Ruth Baseball, Dixie Baseball, National Amateur Baseball Federation (NABF), PONY baseball, Major League Baseball's Reviving Baseball in Inner Cities (RBI), and at-large teams from USA Baseball (the governing body of amateur baseball).

=== School baseball ===
School baseball is played throughout the United States. High schools often have freshman, junior-varsity, and varsity teams. Some middle schools offer baseball programs.

In the 2014-15 season, 486,567 boys and 1,203 girls played baseball at the National Federation of State High School Associations.

=== American Legion Baseball ===
American Legion Baseball is popular with junior-high- and senior-high-school students from ages 13 to 19. American Legion also provides regional, state, and national playoffs.

=== College baseball ===
College baseball is sanctioned by the NCAA, NAIA, and NCBA.

College baseball players, especially professional prospects, often also play in collegiate summer baseball leagues during the off-season. In these leagues, their lodging and meals are provided by their host team, but no money is paid to the players.

Many collegiate summer baseball leagues are affiliated to the National Alliance of College Summer Baseball, National Amateur Baseball Federation or the National Baseball Congress. The MLB Draft League debuted in 2021.

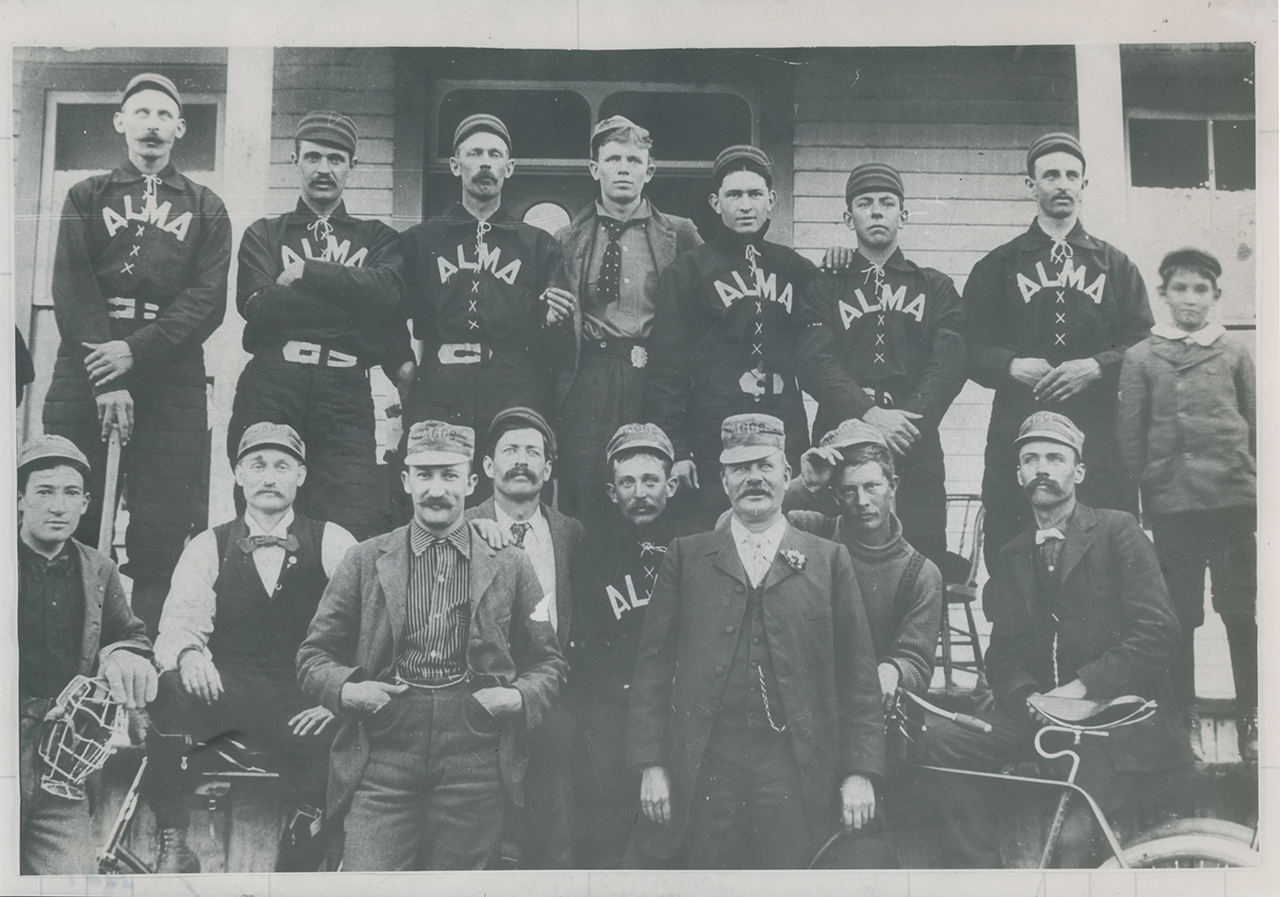
An amateur baseball team in Alma, Colorado in 1899

=== Adult baseball ===
- Town Team Baseball is another area of broad participation of sports institution in the Upper Midwest, particularly in Minnesota, Nebraska, North Dakota, and South Dakota.
- The National Adult Baseball Association (NABA) and the Men's Senior Baseball League (MSBL) are the two largest organizations, sponsoring leagues and tournaments for a variety of age groups (e.g. 18+, 28+, 38+, 48+, 55+, etc.). Both leagues play regular-season games, playoffs and host tournaments on both a regional and national level. The NABA has 25,000 players, and the MSBL has 45,000 players.
- National Baseball Congress
- All-American Amateur Baseball Association

== See also ==
- On the Baseball awards page, see the sections for adult & semi-pro ball, amateur baseball, college baseball, high-school baseball, and youth baseball.
- South Dakota Amateur Baseball Hall of Fame
- Category:Amateur baseball teams
