= United States Post Office (Little Valley, New York) =

- US Post Office--Little Valley
- U.S. National Register of Historic Places
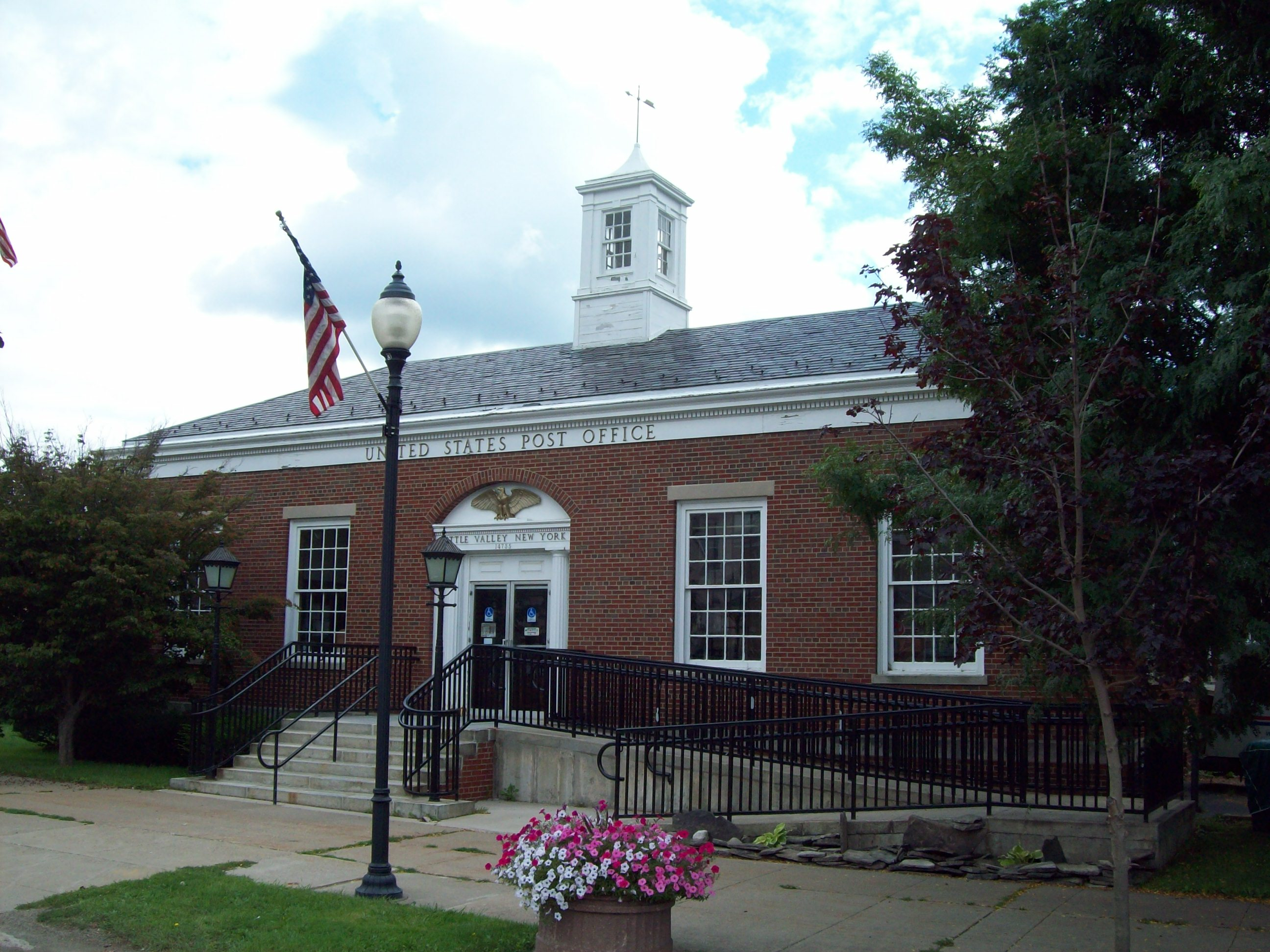
- United States Post Office, August 2010

- Location within New York Location within the United States
- Interactive map showing the location of the U.S. Post Office-Little Valley
- Location: 115 Main St., Little Valley, New York
- Coordinates: 42°14′57″N 78°47′55″W
- Built: 1941
- Architect: Simon, Louis A.; US Treasury Department
- Architectural style: Colonial Revival
- MPS: US Post Offices in New York State, 1858-1943, TR
- NRHP reference No.: 88002344
- Added to NRHP: May 11, 1989

The United States Post Office is a historic post office building located at Little Valley in Cattaraugus County, New York. It was designed and built in 1941 and 1942 as a Works Progress Administration project, and is one of a number of post offices in New York State designed by the Office of the Supervising Architect of the Treasury Department, Louis A. Simon. It is a one-story symmetrically massed brick structure with a stone water table in the Colonial Revival style. Its design is the same as that used in thirteen other post offices across New York State.

It was listed on the National Register of Historic Places in 1989.

Little Valley has had a post office in some form since October 15, 1822. It serves one ZIP Code, 14755, which covers the village and large portions of the towns of Napoli, Mansfield and west Salamanca (including Bucktooth and Sawmill Runs).
