= Town Team Baseball =

Variety of baseball

Town Team Baseball is a variety of amateur or semi-pro baseball played in the United States. In Town Team baseball, sometimes also called townball, the teams represent either a given city or town, or a commercial enterprise which sponsors the team. Usually a statewide governing body sets uniform rules for two or more classes, including proximity (how close the player must live to the town for which he plays) and other eligibility rules, pay or stipends for players and coaches, boundaries, and rules to prevent players from switching teams without reason. Such governing bodies may also coordinate annual statewide playoffs, facilitate communication between teams and leagues, and help to arrange for training and placement of umpires.

== History ==
The history of Town Team Baseball varies from state to state. In addition to the states included below, Townball is played in Iowa, Kansas, Wisconsin, and Minnesota.

=== Minnesota ===
Townball has been played in Minnesota since the 1920s. Townball enjoyed its peak of popularity in the 1940s and 1950s, with as many as 799 teams participating in the 1950 season. The first town baseball team in Minnesota is believed to have been Nininger's, in 1857. Although many towns in Minnesota have fielded baseball teams continuously since the 1880s, townball as we know it really came into existence in 1924 with the organization of the State Tournament, masterminded by the Saint Paul Pioneer Press and Saint Paul Dispatch writers Roy Dunlap and Lou McKenna. One year later, the AM-ABL was formed as a governing body for Townball in Minnesota. This organization still exists as the Minnesota Baseball Association.

Numbers of teams and leagues operating in Minnesota peaked between the end of World War II (1945) and the arrival of Minnesota's new Major League Baseball team, the Minnesota Twins, in 1961. Since the minimum number of players required to field a team for a single game with no substitutions is nine, then at least 7191 (and in actuality a much larger number) individuals participated in Minnesota townball in the peak year, 1950.

==== Historic divisions ====
Historically, Townball teams in Minnesota were divided into three classes: AA, A, and B. In Class AA leagues, teams were permitted three players from outside the local area, and salaries were unlimited; essentially, whatever the team's owners or shareholders could afford, they could pay. Because the unrestrained competition and unlimited budgets bankrupted many teams and forced others to move to a lower class, this form of Townball disappeared in Minnesota by 1960, its leagues all victims of their own excesses. Legendary football coach Bud Grant played Class AA townball in Minnesota and Wisconsin and remarked, "I made more money playing [town team] baseball than I did playing for the Minneapolis Lakers...And we won an NBA title while I was playing for them." Another perspective came from a former official from Bird Island, Fabian Sheehan: "We priced ourselves out of the business, but we sure had a good time doing it."

Nonetheless, some teams were able to turn a profit at this level. Former Fergus Falls pitcher Harley Oyloe said, "As far as Fergus Falls, anyone who was around back then remembers those days and talks about them still. You tell the young kids that we used to have two or three thousand fans for a game and they think you're nuts."

At the Class A level, teams were permitted two players from outside the local area, and salaries were still unlimited. Class B teams were required to draw all their players from a 15-mile radius from city limits, and no salaries were permitted, although many players were enticed to relocate to towns with B-level teams by offers of employment in local schools or establishments. Because this was the most economical level of Townball, it was also the most prevalent. However, it was always the least prestigious level of amateur baseball in Minnesota. It was not unheard-of for a town to field a B-class team in addition to an A or AA level team. Some towns even fielded three teams, with lower-level teams developing talent and feeding it to higher-level teams.

== Today ==
In some states, townball is all but extinct in its traditional form. In others, particularly in Minnesota and Wisconsin, it remains vibrant and popular.

=== Minnesota ===
Today there are more than 300 active Townball teams in Minnesota, playing in over 30 leagues throughout Minnesota, with major concentrations in the southern and central areas of the state.

==== Modern divisions ====
The classification system was revamped in 1986 to restore Minnesota amateur baseball to a 3-tiered format. Today the three classes are A, B, and C. Class A is reserved for teams from the Minneapolis-Saint Paul metropolitan area and Class B teams are typically composed of larger outstate towns and teams that have won the Class C Championship. As of 2000, there were 48 teams in this class. All remaining teams are in Class C. There are 230 teams in this class as of 2012. This division is equivalent to class B under the old classification system. The 2019 champions in Minnesota were:

- St Louis Park in Class A
- Chanhassen in Class B
- Sobieski in Class C

The Class B / Class C state tournament is awarded to different towns throughout the state each season. Typically, 2 towns in close proximity host the tournament. The tournaments for both classes are held in conjunction with each other at the same venues.

- The 2007 State Tournament was held in Hamburg and Norwood Young America
- The 2008 State Tournament was held in Chaska and Shakopee
- The 2009 State Tournament was held in Arlington and Gaylord
- The 2010 State Tournament was held in Willmar and Bird Island
- The 2011 State Tournament was held in Glencoe and Brownton
- The 2012 State Tournament was held in St. Cloud (Putz & Faber Field)
- The 2013 State Tournament was held in Delano and Maple Lake
- The 2014 State Tournament was held in Jordan and Belle Plaine
- The 2015 State Tournament was held in Cold Spring and Watkins
- The 2016 State Tournament was held in Hutchinson, Dassel, and Litchfield
- The 2017 State Tournament was held in Green Isle, Norwood, and Hamburg
- The 2018 State Tournament was held in Shakopee, New Prague, and Jordan
- The 2019 State Tournament was held in Maple Lake, Delano, and Dassel

==== Notable players ====
Notable players from Minnesota Town Team Baseball include Herb Brooks, Carmen Cozza, Bobby Dill, Paul Giel, Bud Grant, Sam "Toothpick" Jones, Dana Kiecker, Jerry Kindall, Corey Koskie, Dick Lanahan, Tom Mee, Eugene McCarthy, Gread McKinnis, Les Munns, Frank O'Rourke (the sports and western author, not the Major League infielder), Jim Pollard, Jim Rantz, Frank "Pep" Saul, Howie Schultz, Herb Score, Dick Siebert, Whitey Skoog, Moose Skowron, Hilton Smith, Terry Steinbach, Dick Stigman, Hy Vandenberg, Rudy York, and Bert Blyleven (for one game in the 2007 season), Jim Eisenreich, Eric Decker, Corey Koskie, Roy Larson

=== Nebraska ===
In 2007 in Nebraska, under the auspices of the Nebraska Baseball Association, there were nine leagues fielding over 50 teams. By 2009, the organization has grown to 75 teams and reaches beyond the borders of Nebraska to accommodate out of state teams that have no other league in which to belong. Just three years old, the Nebraska Baseball Association has begun to pick up momentum and increased exposure. More towns are now assembling teams.
The Nebraska Baseball Association structure was made possible with the research and assistance from the North Dakota Baseball Association, South Dakota Amateur Baseball Association, and the Minnesota Baseball Association. Nebraska, South Dakota, North Dakota, and Minnesota are the only states in the country that have amateur state baseball organizations featuring legitimate qualifying district and state tournaments. Wyoming is seeking assistance from these states to establish another state baseball organization.

2007 Class A
State Champions: Lincoln Lawlor Polecats
State Runner Up: Lincoln Reds
State tournament site: Dunlap Field, Cairo, Ne.
District tournament sites: Hastings, Ne.; Crete, Ne.

2007 Class B
State Champions: Ogallala Moose Lodge #1624
State Runner Up: Hartington Bankers
State tournament site: Dunlap Field, Cairo, Ne.
District tournament sites: Schuyler, Ne.; Hartington, Ne.

2008 Class A
State Champions: Lincoln Dirtbags
State Runner Up: Kearney Kernels
Tournament MVP: Jeremy Fries, Lincoln Dirtbags State tournament site: Kearney, Ne.

2008 Class B
State Champions: Wakefield Capitals
State Runner Up: Yutan Pilots
Tournament MVP: Max Greve, Wakefield State tournament site: Wakefield, Ne. Eaton Field
District tournament sites: Sidney, Ne.; Tekamah, Ne.; Chadron, Ne.; O'Neill, Ne.; Wakefield, Ne.

2009 Class A
State Champions: Lincoln Diablos
State Runner Up: Kearney Kernels
Tournament MVP: Kevin Hanley, Lincoln Diablos
Class A state tournament site: Kearney, Ne.
District tournament sites: Omaha, Ne., Lincoln, Ne., Gibbon, Ne., Alliance, Ne.; Scottsbluff, Ne.

2009 Class B
State Champions: Hartington Bankers
State Runner Up: Haxtun, Colorado Bombers
Tournament MVP: Brett Bosn, Hartington Bankers
Class B state tournament site: Wakefield, Ne.
District tournament sites: Ashland, Ne.; Wakefield, Ne.; Cairo, Ne.; Imperial, Ne., Chadron, Ne.

2009 Roy & Ross Speece Umpire of the Year: Tim Higgins, Grand Island, Ne.

2010 Class A
State Champions: Kearney Kernels
State Runner Up: Lincoln Reds
Tournament MVP: Kyle Kraska, Kearney Kernels
Class A state tournament site: Kearney, Ne.
District tournament sites: Omaha, Ne., Lincoln, Ne., McCool Junction, Ne., Scottsbluff, Ne.

2010 Class B
State Champions: Haxtun, Colorado Bombers
State Runner Up: Chadron Titans
Tournament MVP: Jake McClain, Chadron Titans
State tournament site: Sidney, Ne.
District tournament sites: Pierce, Ne.; Yutan, Ne.; Scotia, Ne.; Haxtun, Co.; Chadron, Ne. 2010 Roy & Ross Speece Umpire of the Year: Mike Davis, Yutan, Ne. 2010 Max Greve Player of the Year: Travis Boyll-Kearney Kernels

2011 Class A
State Champions: Omaha Tigers
State Runner Up: Lincoln Reds
Tournament MVP: Caleb Zimmer, Omaha Tigers, Omaha Central
State Tournament sites: Brown Park at John Stella Field, Omaha Central at Boyd Park
Class A Max Greve Player of the Year: Kevin Hanley, Lincoln Diablos
Roy & Ross Speece Umpire of the Year: Ray Manske

2011 Class B
State Champions: Valley Roughriders
State Runner Up: Mead Steam Engines
Tournament MVP: Chris Riley, Valley Roughriders
State Tournament sites: Dunlap Field-Cairo, Grover Cleveland Alexander field-St. Paul
Class B Max Greve Player of the Year: Jake Stutzman, Cairo Camels

=== North Dakota ===
The North Dakota Amateur Baseball state tournament is played every year at Jack Brown Stadium in Jamestown with four different divisions: Masters, A, AA, and AAA.

The Masters division is reserved for players 35 and older and was established in 2018. The tournament is usually held on the last weekend in July. Teams competing in this division can have up to two players under 35 but neither of those players can pitch. Usually these under 35 players are catchers or middle infielders.

Class A is reserved for development teams or teams that are new to amateur baseball. Many teams that field Class A are usually younger teams whom their main team usually play in the AA or AAA tournaments. Because of this, any player who plays in the A tournament that year cannot play in the AA or AAA tournaments as well. Also the winner of the Class A tournament automatically gets moved up to AA the next season.

Class AA is the next highest up and is usually reserved for more established teams or teams that have players who have had college baseball experience. Class AA was added in 1965 and these teams are usually found in smaller towns or the talent level is not enough to play in AAA.

Class AAA is the highest division of amateur baseball in North Dakota. Teams in this division are usually in bigger cities or college towns and have many of their players currently playing college baseball. The AAA division has been dominated by the Jamestown Elks and Jamestown Merchants since being added in 1991 as all but four times (1995, 2000, 2021, 2022 and 2025) that one of these two teams has won the AAA championship.

For 2026, the dates and number of teams for each tournament. In all tournaments except Masters, the winner of each pool played in the Championship Game

Class	Dates	Teams/Format
Masters (35+)	July 25-26	4 (round robin)
A	August 7-9	6 (two 3-team pools)
AA	August 13-16	8 bracket
AAA	August 20-23	6 bracket

==== State Champions ====
Year	Masters (35+)	A	AA	AAA
2026	Jamestown Tarnos	Walsh County Wellcats	Minot Mallards(North Dakota MSBL)	Jamestown Greyhounds
2025	Jamestown Tarnos	Jamestown NODAKS	Wahpeton Wahppers	Jamestown Greyhounds
2024	Enderlin Indies	Jamestown Tarnos	Enderlin Indies	Jamestown Merchants
2023	Jamestown Tarnos	Jamestown Tarno Brewers	Cass County Catfish	Jamestown Merchants
2022	Jamestown Tarnos	Jamestown Merchants II	Jamestown Tarnos	Jamestown Greyhounds
2021	Jamestown Tarnos	Walsh County Wellcats	Jamestown Tarnos	Jamestown Greyhounds
2020	Jamestown Tarnos	Fairview	Enderlin Indies	Jamestown Elks
2019	Jamestown Tarnos	Beulah Blackjaws	Jamestown Greyhounds	Jamestown Elks
2018	Jamestown Tarnos	not held	Valley City Saints	Jamestown Merchants
2017		Tolna Trojans	Cass County Catfish	Jamestown Merchants
2016		Jamestown Tarnos	Jamestown Greyhounds	Jamestown Elks
2015		Gackle Merchants	Jamestown Greyhounds	Jamestown Merchants
2014		LaMoure Merchants	Cando Harlows	Jamestown Elks
2013		Jamestown Greyhounds	Valley City Saints	Jamestown Merchants
2012		Jamestown Greyhounds	Jamestown Tarnos	Jamestown Elks
2011		Jamestown Greyhounds	Enderlin Indies	Jamestown Elks
2010		Valley City Merchants	Enderlin Indies	Jamestown Elks
2009		Fairview	Jamestown Miller Chillers	Jamestown Elks
2008		Fargo Mets	Jamestown Miller Chillers	Jamestown Merchants
2007		Fairmount	Enderlin Indies	Jamestown Merchants
2006		Fairview	Jamestown Tarnos	Jamestown Merchants
2005		Jamestown Merchants II	Beulah Blackjaws	Jamestown Elks
2004		Fairview	Mandan Prairie Dogs	Jamestown Elks
2003				Jamestown Merchants
2002				Jamestown Merchants
2001				Jamestown Merchants

=== South Dakota ===
Great Town Team Baseball teams and players from South Dakota are honored by the South Dakota Amateur Baseball Hall of Fame in Lake Norden. The 2010 champions for South Dakota were:

- The Brandon Valley Merchants in Class A

~ Nick Bruning State MVP ~ Nick Bruning, Bryce Ahrendt, Nate Alfson, & Tyler Pierson members of the BV Merchants who made ALL-STATE Team

- The Dimock-Emery Raptors in Class B

=== Wisconsin ===
The Wisconsin Baseball Association (WBA) is Wisconsin's largest amateur baseball association, composed of six separate leagues. The WBA has 56 teams located throughout Central, Northern and Western Wisconsin along the St. Croix and Mississippi River valleys from Superior to La Crosse, and Hudson to Wausau. The Wisconsin Baseball Association Playoffs are held over two weekends in the middle of August at various sites that rotate annually. A two division format was re-introduced in 2024.

PAST WISCONSIN BASEBALL ASSOCIATION STATE CHAMPIONS:

2026- A-TILDEN TIGERS --(Runner-up: River Falls; Semifinalists: Cadott Red Sox, Everest Merchants)

     B-WHITEHALL WHITETAILS 

2025- A-RIVER FALLS FIGHTING FISH (Runner-up: Osseo Merchants)

     B-WHITEHALL WHITETAILS

2024- A-RIVER FALLS FIGHTING FISH --(Runner-up: Tilden Tigers; Semifinalists: Spooner Cardinals, Wisconsin Rapids Redhawks)

     B-OSCEOLA BRAVES

2023- TILDEN TIGERS --(Runner-up: Everest Merchants; Semifinalists: Osseo Merchants, Wisconsin Rapids Redhawks)

2022- RIVER FALLS FIGHTING FISH --(Runner-up: Tilden Tigers; Semifinalists: Prescott Pirates, Spooner Cardinals)

2021- HAUGEN KNIGHTS --(Runner-up: Spooner Cardinals; Semifinalists: Holmen Features, Tilden Tigers)

2020- RIVER FALLS FIGHTING FISH --(Runner-up: Brill Millers; Semifinalists: Hayward Hawks, Viroqua Sox)

2019- EAU CLAIRE CAVALIERS --(Runner-up: Tilden Tigers; Semifinalists: Eau Claire Bears, Hayward Hawks)

2018- OSSEO MERCHANTS --(Runner-up: Sparta Miller; Semifinalists: Everest Merchants, Tilden Tigers)

2017- SPARTA MILLER --(Runner-Up: Osseo Merchants; Semifinalists: Brill Millers, Spooner Cardinals)

2016- SPARTA MILLER --(Runner-Up: Osseo Merchants; Semifinalists: Elmwood Expos, Whitehall Wolves)

2015- CHASEBURG-COON VALLEY BLUES --(Runner-Up: Sparta Miller; Semifinalists: La Crescent Cardinals, Prescott Pirates)

2014- PRESCOTT PIRATES --(Runner-Up: La Crescent Cardinals; Semifinalists: Brill Millers, Chaseburg-Coon Valley Blues)

2013- BRILL MILLERS --(Runner-Up: Sparta Miller; Semifinalists: Menomonie Eagles, Prescott Pirates)

2012- MENOMONIE EAGLES --(Runner-Up: Prescott Pirates; Semifinalists: Ellsworth Hubbers, Haugen Knights)

2011- RIVER FALLS FIGHTING FISH --(Runner-Up: Beef River Bullfrogs; Semifinalists: Onalaska Athletics, Rib Lake Lakers)

2010- HAUGEN KNIGHTS --(Runner-Up: Onalaska Athletics; Semifinalists: River Falls Fighting Fish, Sparta Miller)

2009- EAU CLAIRE BEARS --(Runner-up: Haugen Knights; Semifinalists: La Crescent Cardinals, Prescott Pirates)

2008- EAU CLAIRE BEARS --(Runner-up: La Crosse Athletics; Semifinalists: Brill Millers, Haugen Knights)

2007- CHASEBURG-COON VALLEY BLUES --(Runner-up: Prescott Pirates; Semifinalists: Brill Millers, Eau Claire Bears)

2006- LA CRESCENT CARDINALS --(Runner-up: Grantsburg Honkers; Semifinalists: Eau Claire Bears, Sparta Miller)

2005- EAU CLAIRE BEARS --(Runner-up: Everest Merchants; Semifinalists: Bangor Red Birds, Plum City Blues)

2004- TILDEN TIGERS --(Runner-up: Sparta Miller; Semifinalists: Bangor Red Birds, Eau Claire Bears)

2003- OSCEOLA BRAVES --(Runner-up: Bangor Red Birds; Semifinalists: Oulu Blue Jays, Tilden Tigers)

2002- HUDSON RIVER RATS --(Runner-up: Augusta Athletics; Semifinalists: Oulu Blue Jays, Spring Valley Hawks)

=== New York and Pennsylvania ===
In Western New York, Town Team Baseball was revived in 2013 after a long hiatus, under the auspices of the Alle–Catt Baseball league. In 2014, Mike "Smitty" Smith (then the manager of one of the teams) called for a split in that league and organized that league's New York teams into the Southwestern New York Men's Baseball League. The league's first title was decided in August 2014, when the Fillmore Town Team defeated the Little Valley Thunder. The league returned for its second season in 2015, expanding into Pennsylvania; that year, the team from Bradford, Pennsylvania defeated Fillmore for the championship. Bradford again defeated Fillmore for the 2016 title. The league was abandoned after the 2016 season after Smith opted to pursue a political campaign.

The five remaining Pennsylvania teams in Alle–Catt continue to play as their own league.

== In popular culture ==
- The fictional Lake Wobegon Whippets town team was a repeatedly-mentioned topic of Garrison Keillor's monologue on the show A Prairie Home Companion

== See also ==
- Riverview League
- South Dakota Amateur Baseball Hall of Fame
- Sunday league football (United Kingdom)

== Bibliography ==
- Caple, J. "For the love of the game". ESPN.
- Caple, J. "Baseball The Way It Ought To Be". ESPN.
- Max, M. "Boys Of Summer' Back For More Townball In Hamel". WCCO.
