= North Central Pennsylvania =

Region of Pennsylvania, United States

Coordinates: 41°20′N 77°20′W

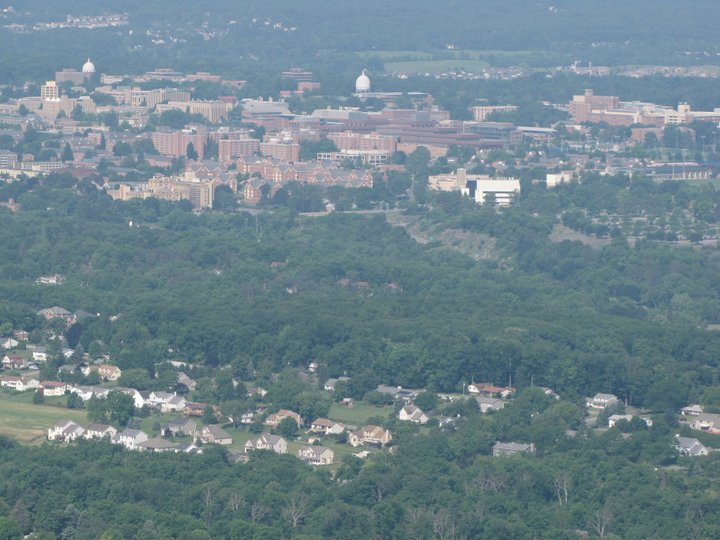
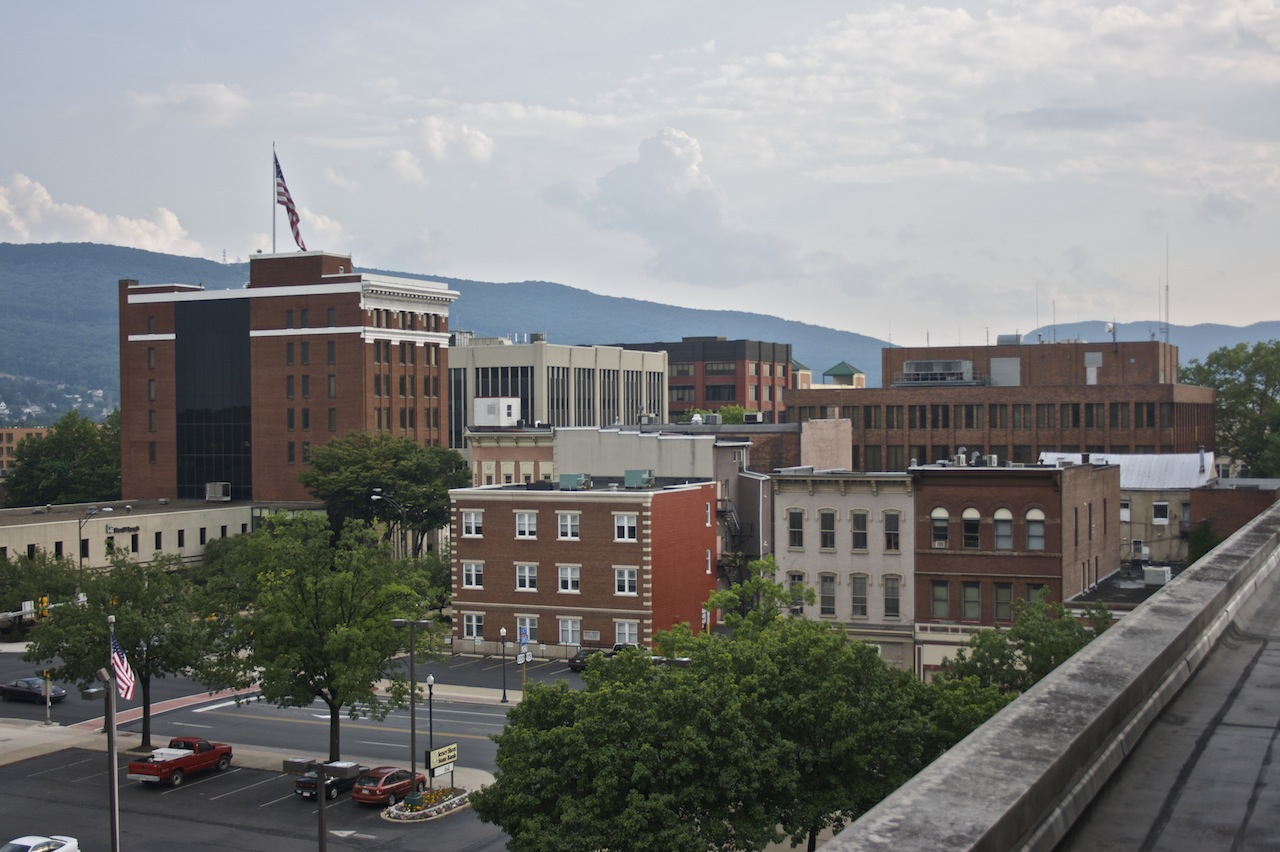
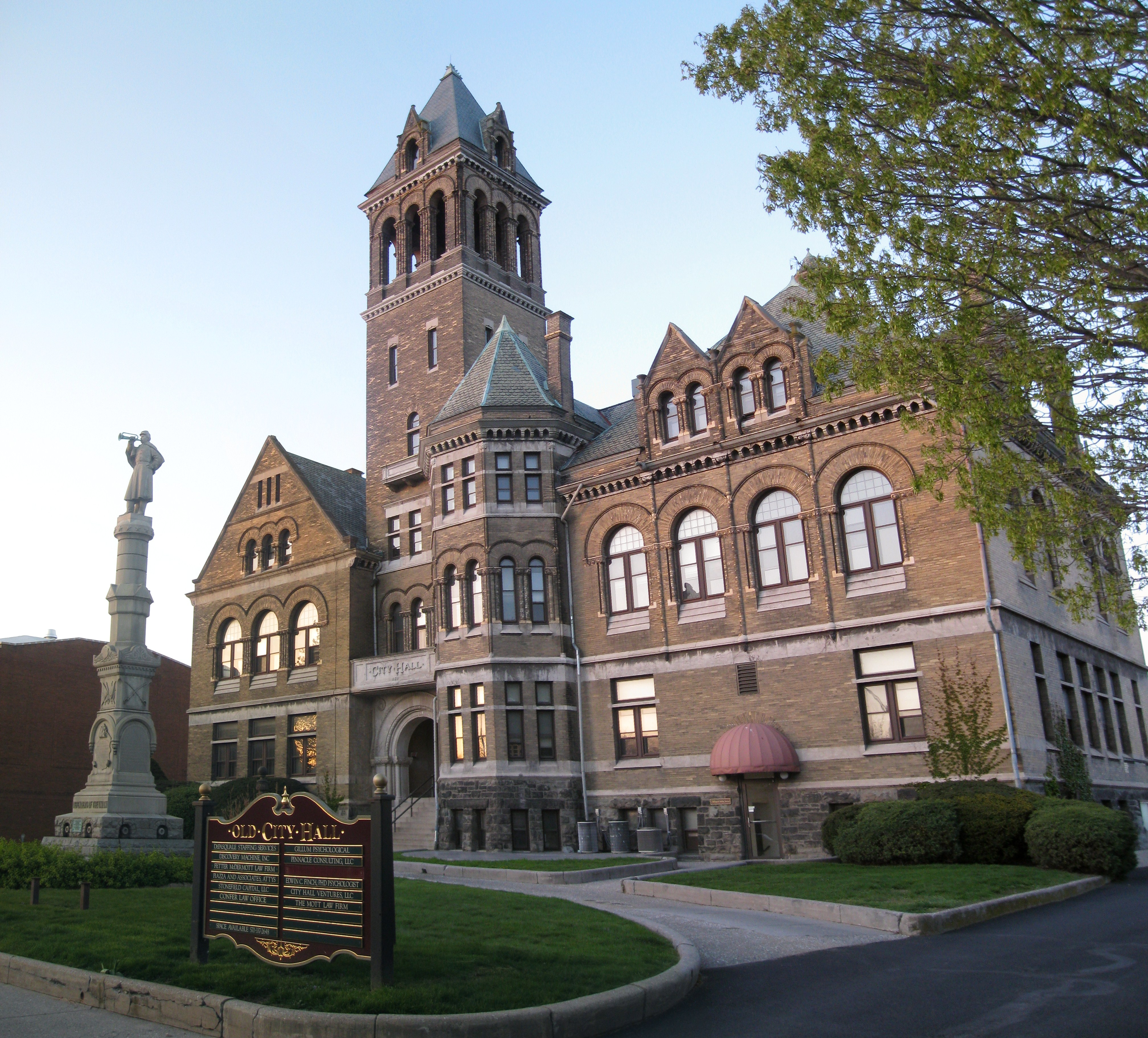
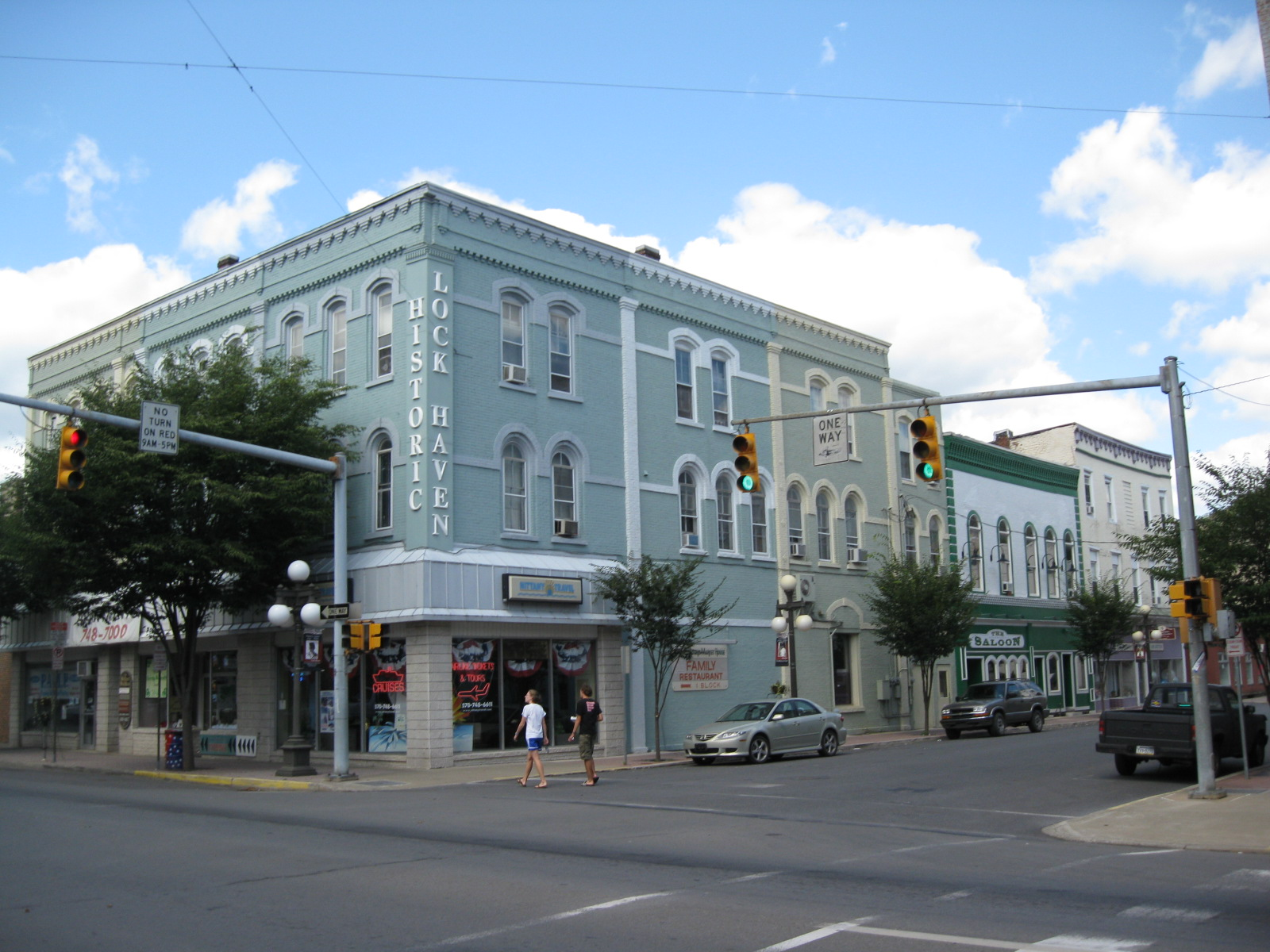
- Interactive map of North Central Pennsylvania
- Country: United States
- Commonwealth: Pennsylvania
- Largest city: State College
- Other cities: List: In Region: Williamsport; Lock Haven; Mansfield

Population (2011 estimate)
  - Total: 3,129,333
- Time zone: UTC-5 (ET)
  - Summer (DST): UTC-4 (EDT)
- Area code: 570

North Central Pennsylvania, parts of which are sometimes referred to as the Northern Tier, is a region in the U.S. state of Pennsylvania which consists of sixteen counties.

== History ==
The region is believed to have been settled by Europeans in 1759 but was not officially recorded until 1761. Most of the colonists were of Dutch, English, German or Scandinavian ancestry. Prior to these settlers this area was under the control of multiple Native American tribes.

This region is one of the state's most rich in terms of historical significance, popular culture and population diversity. Much of this area is in the Susquehanna Valley which contains the Susquehanna River which flows through New York, Pennsylvania, and Maryland. The northernmost part of this region is bordered to the north by the Southern Tier of New York state. Together, these regions are known as the Twin Tiers. The five Northern Tier counties are home to roughly 180,000 people distributed among many small towns and the countryside. The more southern areas, such as Lycoming, Clinton, Centre and Northumberland Counties, are where most of the region's population lives.

== Description ==
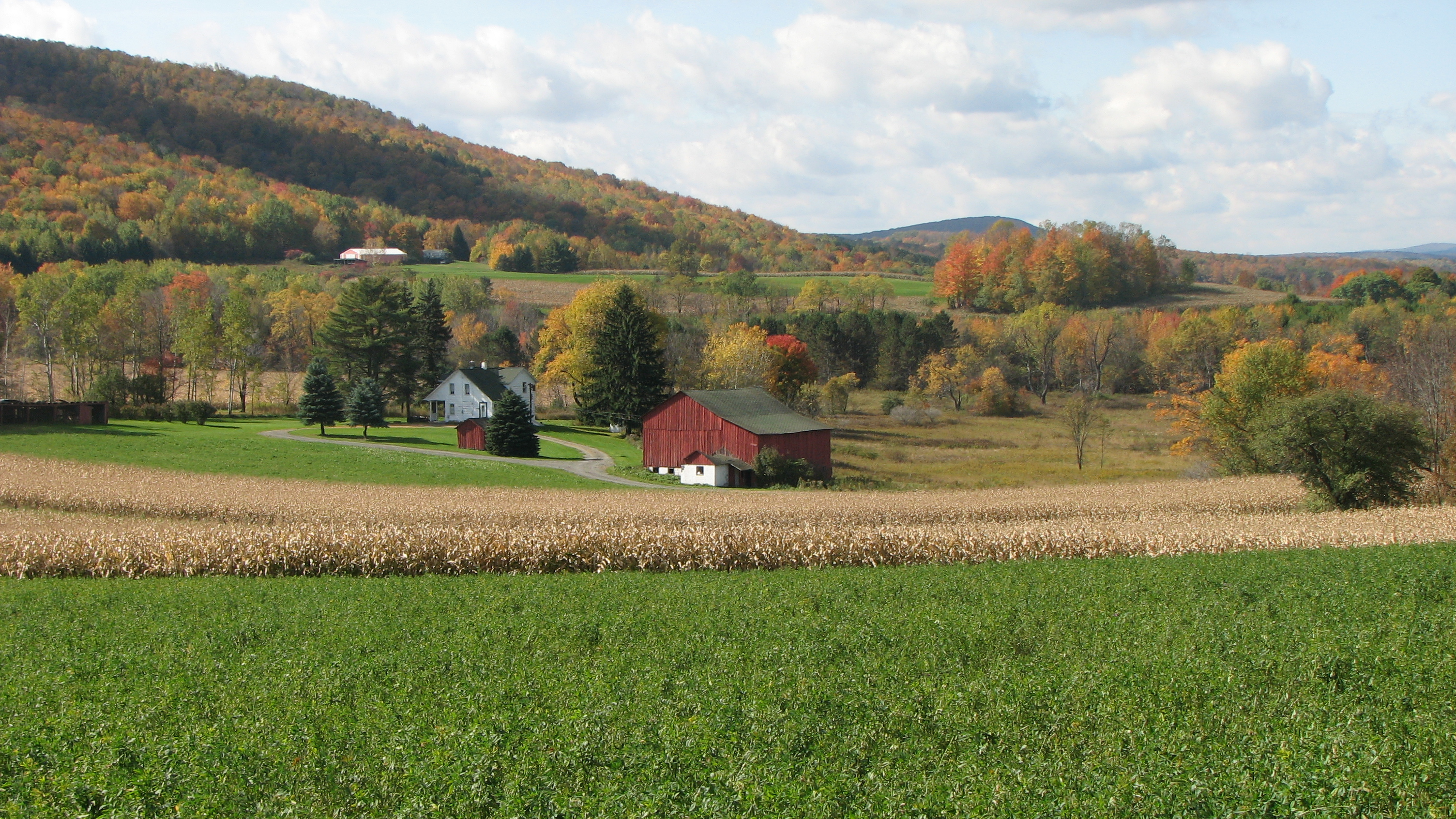
Agriculture plays a significant part in the economy of North Central Pennsylvania. Almost one quarter of its land is used for agriculture.

North Central Pennsylvania has an abundance of flora and fauna, in addition to its cultural diversity. The region is mostly mountainous as it is located in the northern part of the Appalachian Mountain range. There are few large cities in North Central Pennsylvania, most of its population live in smaller boroughs or townships (populations between 5,000-15,000) than in large cities.

This region is also the state and national leader in the production of natural gas as it sits on a large gas deposit, part of the Marcellus Shale.

== Counties and cities ==
=== Counties ===
North Central Pennsylvania consists of 12 counties.

In alphabetical order those counties are:

- Bradford
- Centre
- Clinton
- Columbia
- Lycoming
- Montour
- Northumberland
- Potter
- Sullivan
- Snyder
- Tioga
- Union

=== Cities ===
Largest cities based on population (Top 5):

City	Population	County
State College	42,161	Centre
Wilkes-Barre	40,780	Luzerne
Williamsport	29,304	Lycoming
Hazleton	25,340	Luzerne
Bloomsburg	17,577	Columbia

== Education ==
There are a total of 89 public school districts in this area, in which are 102 high schools, 147 middle schools and 307 elementary schools.

=== Universities ===
- Bloomsburg University of Pennsylvania
- Bucknell University
- Lock Haven University of Pennsylvania
- Lycoming College
- Mansfield University of Pennsylvania
- Pennsylvania College of Technology
- Pennsylvania State University

Private universities in italics

== Sport ==
North Central Pennsylvania has no major sports franchises. However, Pennsylvania State University is located in Centre County. As part of the Big Ten Conference the University has a massive athletic grasp on this region, in terms of sporting events and camps.

=== Non-major professional sports ===
- Williamsport Crosscutters Single-A affiliate of the Philadelphia Phillies
- State College Spikes Single-A affiliate of the St. Louis Cardinals

=== Little League World Series ===
In August every summer, South Williamsport holds the Little League World Series. About one hundred players and their family members from around the country and world come to compete and spectate. The city welcomes thousands of visitors during this period of time. The games are aired on ESPN worldwide.

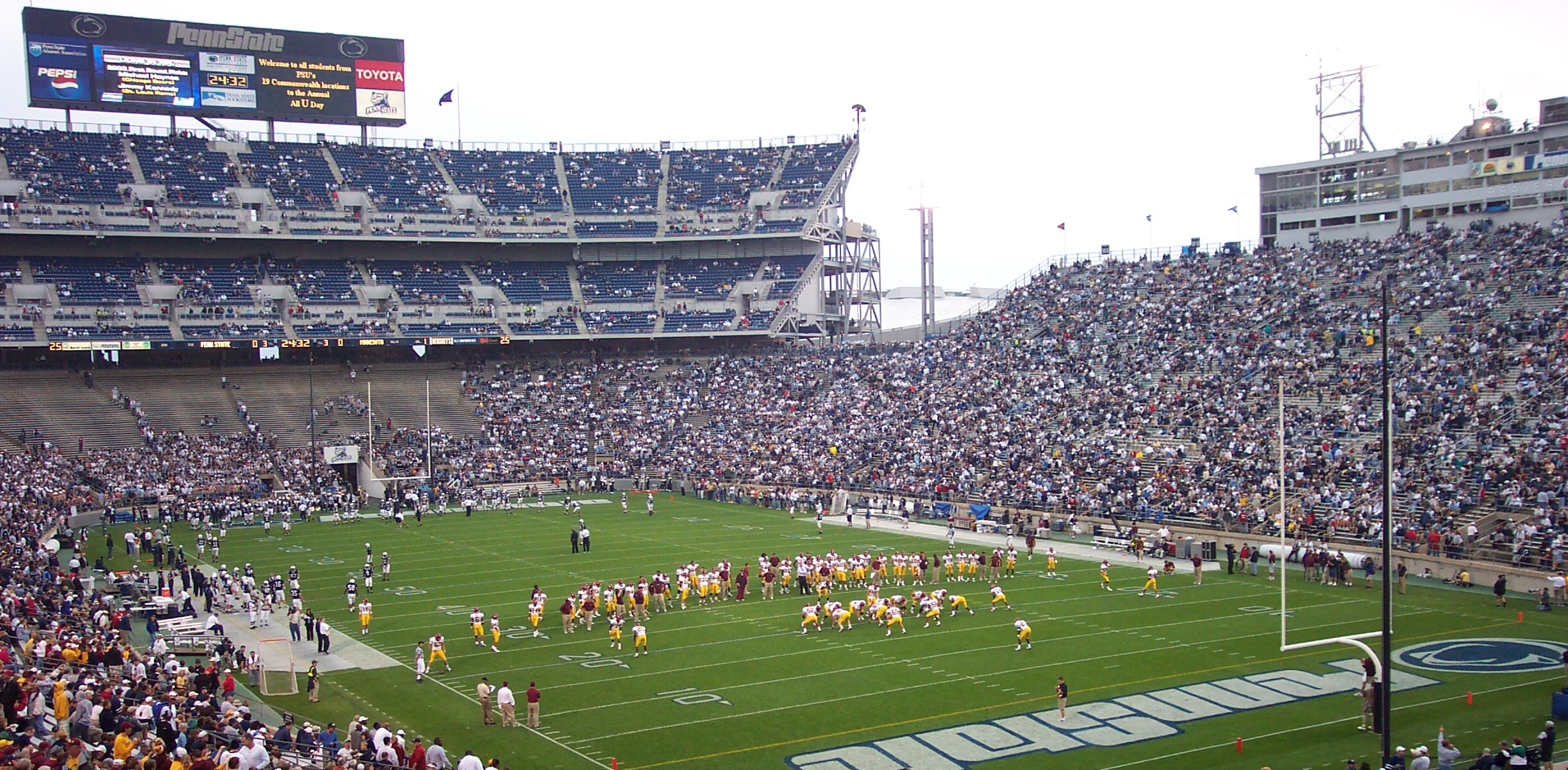
Beaver Stadium on the campus of Pennsylvania State University.
