= Haiti Partnership =

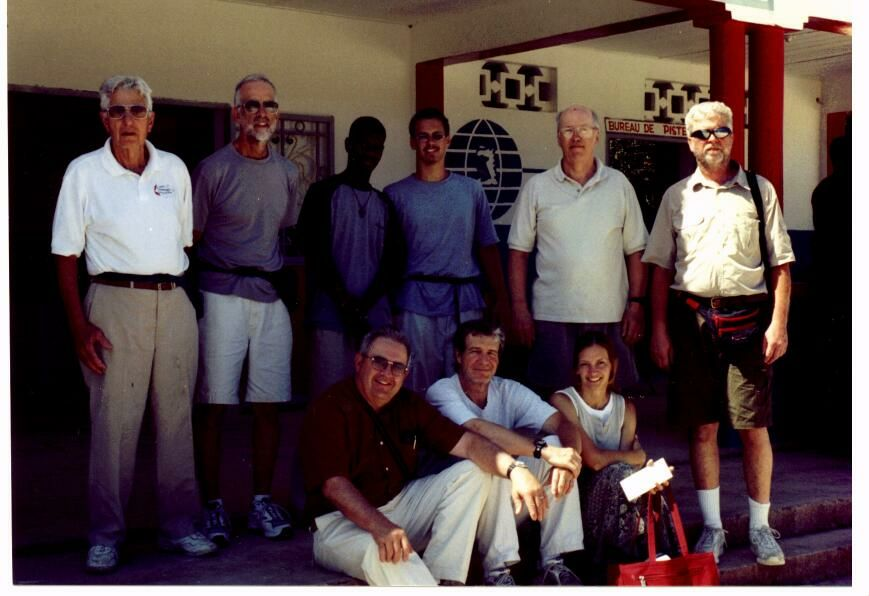
2003 Haiti Partnership team at Jeremie Airport

2003 Haiti Partnership team at Bois Neuf Malor Worksite

The Haiti Partnership is a group of Methodist volunteer missionaries from the New York and Pennsylvania region. Founded in 1995, the partnership has conducted numerous missions in remote Haitian villages and towns, including: Bainet, Hermitage, Bois Neuf Malor, Jeremie, Golbotine, and others. A mission consists of up to fourteen volunteers traveling by plane to Port-au-Prince making a brief stop at a VIM (United Methodist Volunteers in Mission) guest house. A typical team travels with up to twenty- two or more containers; of which contain tools, food, toys, hygiene equipment, as well as various medical supplies.

Teams travel with the containers by vehicle to remote sites after their brief stay at the Methodist guest house in Port-au-Prince. Most teams work on construction projects with Haitian workers to construct schools, churches, and other necessities in the most needing areas of Haiti. Normally teams travel in the months of January, February, and March mainly due to lower temperatures. The partnership receives various informal funding, i.e. church collections and donations. The partnership, in conjunction with the Wyoming Conference, also arranges fundraising events like the "great fifty days", an annual fundraising event held in the Southern Tier of New York area. After a "typical" nine-day "round trip" stay, teams travel back to the United States.

They stepped up their efforts for the 2010 Haiti earthquake
