= Salamanca Press =

Newspaper in Salamanca (city), New York, New York

- Type: Weekly newspaper
- Owner: Bradford Publishing
- Editor: Kellen M. Quigley, Managing Editor
- Founded: February 1867
- Headquarters: Salamanca, New York, United States
- Circulation: 2,100 (as of 2017)
- ISSN: 8755-9110
- OCLC number: 11217777
- Website: salamancapress.com

The Salamanca Press is a newspaper serving Cattaraugus County, New York. Based in the city of Salamanca, the paper is owned by Bradford Publishing, which also publishes the Bradford Era and the Olean Times Herald. The newspaper focuses on the municipalities of Salamanca, Ellicottville, Cattaraugus, Little Valley and Randolph. Its coverage also extends into neighboring areas, such as East Otto, West Valley, and Conewango, among others. The paper is the official newspaper of the City of Salamanca and the Salamanca City Central School District.

An offshoot, the Gowanda Press, launched in August 2016. The Gowanda version of the paper was launched to fill the void of the Gowanda Pennysaver News, which abruptly shut down (along with a number of weekly papers in the vicinity) in July of that year. The Gowanda Press would close operations in October 2017.

== History ==
Founded in 1867 as the Cattaraugus Republican, the paper printed weekly editions until 1904, when The Republican Press was founded and printed daily. The name would eventually change to the Salamanca Republican-Press in 1926 and, as it is known now, The Salamanca Press in 1981.

It would continue as a daily newspaper until 2009 when its publication was made weekly again. And through the majority of Salamanca’s history — including fires, floods, politics and more — it was one family that headed the newspaper’s publication and management. In fact, the newspaper’s ownership stayed in the same family’s hands for more than 100 years.

The newspaper began under the direction of Augustine W. Ferrin, a native of Concord, near Springville, who had purchased the Springville Herald in 1867 and moved its equipment to Ellicottville, which was the county seat at the time.

Ferrin, who had served as city editor of the Buffalo Express when he was only 22, founded the Cattaraugus Republican and managed it until he sold his interest in the company to Blanchard B. Weber, his brother-in-law, in 1895.

Weber had been involved in the Cattaraugus Republican’s operations since he bought half an interest in the company in 1873 when the newspaper operated in Little Valley. He took charge of the newspaper’s office in Salamanca at that time and was active in the community for the next 70 years.

Weber’s son, Matthew, became editor of the paper in 1902 and two years later helped establish the daily Republican Press — which was renamed the Salamanca Republican-Press in 1926. Matthew Weber’s son, Latham B. Weber, began working for the Salamanca Republican-Press in 1938 and eventually became managing editor in 1945. He would serve that role until 1977, when his nephew, Weber Austin, became the fifth publisher of the paper.

The ownership of the paper left the Weber family in 1976 when the Salamanca Republican-Press announced the purchase of the stock of the company by a group of businessmen from Pennsylvania. A derivative of those owners, now identified as Bradford Publishing Co., currently operates The Salamanca Press along with its sister papers, the Olean Times Herald, The Bradford, Pennsylvania Era and The Gowanda Press.

The history of The Salamanca Press also includes a variety of offices, beginning at the corner of Washington and Monroe streets in Ellicottville in 1867 and moving to Little Valley in 1868 before opening a Salamanca branch in 1873.

Two years later, the paper printed its first edition in Salamanca and has had offices in the city ever since.

Prior to 1926, most of The Press history was on Atlantic Street in the space later occupied by Reed’s Newsroom across from the Dudley Hotel. Then, in April 1926, the move was made to its present location at 36 River St.

== Timeline ==
Feb. 7, 1867 The first edition of the Cattaraugus Republican prints out of the newspaper’s office at the corner of Washington and Monroe streets in Ellicottville, which was the county seat at the time. The first edition featured four pages. A. W. Ferrin served as first editor and publisher.

May 20 & 21, 1868 The Cattaraugus Republican moves — along with the county seat — from Ellicottville to Little Valley. The final Ellicottville edition was published May 21, with the first Little Valley edition published May 28.

July 1, 1873 The Republican commences business in Salamanca and its first press, which was delivered a few days earlier, was the first printing press in Salamanca. The press makes its first appearance in public in operation on a float in the industrial parade July 4. The Republican begins business in Salamanca with the office located on the second floor of the Fitts Building at 123 Main St., now Weast Insurance Agency.

Spring 1874 Hevenor Bros. erects an addition on their north side of the store at the corner of Main and Atlantic streets and The Republican moves into its second home in Salamanca.

Oct. 28, 1875 The Republican prints its first edition in Salamanca. Printing was possible after the cylinder press the newspaper was printed on was moved to Salamanca from Little Valley earlier in the month. A copy of that first edition was preserved in a tin box of the Republican building that was erected in 1882, but the whereabouts of those contents are unknown.

Sept. 4, 1880 The Hevenor block — including The Republican’s offices — is destroyed by a fire that tears through much of Main Street. Its regular issue for the week had just been mailed, and “while the conflagration was still raging,” according to a history printed in 1887, the Republican rented an idle newspaper plant in Salamanca and printed a special “Fire Extra” edition. The Republican would rebuilt at the same location, 7 Atlantic St.

1881 B.B. Weber, one of the publishers of The Republican along with A.W. Ferrin and Stephen Green, moves to Olean and takes over the Olean Times. Four years later, he sold the paper to Charles Straight and rejoined The Republican.

1895 A.W. Ferrin sells his interest in The Republican to B.B. Weber but continues to work with the publication until his death in 1902.

September 1902 Matthew Weber, the son of B.B. Weber, one of the newspaper’s publishers, is named editor of The Republican.

April 25, 1904 A new partnership, B.B. Weber & Son, forms. The first edition of The Republican Press, which would be printed daily until 2009, publishes. The decision to print a daily came after the B. R. & P. railroad announced it would establish a division headquarters in East Salamanca. According to an editorial printed April 1916, the decision to produce a daily paper was made on a Saturday and the first issue appeared two days later.

July 26, 1915 The Republican Press announces it will begin receiving news over a leased wire from the International News Service. It assures it will print “today’s news today” and boasts none of the “Buffalo papers reaching here in the afternoon contains the latest news that will be found in The Press.”

Oct. 28, 1918 On exactly 43 years to the day after the first newspaper was printed in Salamanca, The Republican Press inaugurates the Associated Press wire service. It would use Associated Press content frequently until the newspaper became hyper-local in its coverage as a weekly in 2009.

Jan. 3, 1921 A backed-up sewer on Atlantic Street floods the pressroom of The Republican Press, as well as parts of the Salamanca Trust Co., but the paper is printed. It would be a reoccurring problem on Atlantic Street for several days, but the paper didn’t miss an edition.

June 24, 1919 Work commences to remodel part of The Republican Press office at the corner of Main and Atlantic streets to relieve congestion in The Press plant.

July 21, 1923 The Republican Press prints a special second edition of its daily paper after a fire that starts on Sycamore Avenue sweeps through the city’s downtown district and causes about $750,000 in damage.

Jan. 26, 1926 The paper purchases the Ellicott O’Brien property at 36 River St. to eventually move its offices from Atlantic Street to its current location. Ground would be broken at the site April 15.

Feb. 16, 1926 The Republican Press changes its name to the Salamanca Republican-Press. It cites the name change to “better describe the relations between the people of Salamanca and this paper which so long has been a part of the community life that it will convey a more accurate idea of the policy and purpose of the paper.” It kept “Republican” in its name, stating the word is “an adjective rather than a noun,” acknowledging that the term “republic” refers to a community of people rather than the paper having a political interest.

Aug. 2, 1926 The first edition of the Republican-Press is printed at 36 River St. The location continues to serve as home of The Press offices, although the press is no longer location in the building. A formal opening of the office to the public would be made Sept. 1. Sept. 1, 1926 A formal public opening of the Salamanca Republican-Press office at 36 River St. is hosted by the newspaper. A joint souvenir edition of the Salamanca Republican-Press and The Cattaraugus Republican is issued to celebrate the opening of the papers’ new headquarters on River Street.

July 15, 1943 B.B. Weber, publisher of the Salamanca Republican-Press, dies at 95. Weber came to Salamanca in 1873 and took charge of the branch office of the Cattaraugus Republican. His son, Matthew Weber, becomes the sole proprietor. The paper reported in 1938 that B.B. Weber celebrated his 90th birthday by working at his desk at the newspaper office.

Oct. 2, 1944 Arch Bliss fills the vacancy of city editor at the Salamanca Republican-Press. The vacancy was created after John L.F. King, who served in the position since 1923, resigned.

1945 Matthew Weber’s son, Latham B. Weber, becomes managing editor and business manager of the Republican-Press upon returning from Navy duty in World War II. Latham first joined the staff in 1938.

Oct. 1, 1946 The partnership of Matthew Weber and Latham B. Weber is formed and the pair publishes the Republican-Press together until Matthew Weber’s death in 1962.

May 29, 1953 The Salamanca Republican-Press prints its first Allegany State Park Vacation Guide, a supplement included with the newspaper in late spring. The vacation guide, called Venture Out since 2016, continues to be printed annually every May, and copies are distributed to Allegany State Park and area businesses throughout the summer.

July 21, 1961 Latham B. Weber becomes editor and publisher of the Salamanca Republican-Press, succeeding his father, Matthew Weber, who became editor emeritus.

Dec. 16, 1962 Matthew Weber, former longtime editor of the Salamanca Republican-Press, dies at 85. He and his father, B.B. Weber, founded the Republican-Press as a daily in Salamanca in 1904, two years after taking ownership of its mother paper, the weekly Cattaraugus Republican.

Oct. 1, 1963 A family corporation, Salamanca Republican-Press Inc., is formed. Its principal stockholders were Latham B. Weber, Carol Weber Bennett and Weber Austin, all of Salamanca, and Matthew Weber Jr., of Huntsville, Ala.

Feb. 20, 1967 The first edition of the Salamanca Republican-Press is printed on a new web offset press, a Goss Community Press. It replaced the previous press that had been in operation at the paper since the newspaper’s plant was built on River Street in 1926.

June 23, 1972 The Salamanca Republican-Press misses its first edition in its history due to the flooding of the Allegheny River. It would be one of only two times the paper fails to print, the most recent being during the Ethan Allen fire in 1977. The regular press run of the paper June 24 was stepped up from 4,600 to 8,000 — plus another 2,000 the following Monday — to cover the flooding.

Jan. 23, 1976 The Salamanca Republican-Press fails to print for the second time in its history as a fire destroys the Ethan Allen plant on Rochester Street and cuts off power for eight hours to much of the city. The paper has not missed another edition since.

Oct. 1, 1976 The newspaper officially passes out of the hands of the family that founded it when The Salamanca Republican-Press Inc. announces purchase of the stock of the company by a group of area businessmen from Pennsylvania. Latham B. Weber remained editor and publisher of the paper, and his nephew, Weber Austin, remained production manager. The paper had been established by A.W. Ferrin, whose brother-in-law, B.B. Weber, was Latham Weber’s grandfather.

Dec. 31, 1977 Latham B. Weber retires as editor and publisher of the Salamanca Republican-Press, where he had worked for nearly 40 years. His nephew, Weber Austin, succeeded him as the fifth publisher of the newspaper since its start in 1867.

Sept. 1, 1981 The Salamanca Republican-Press drops the word “Republican,” which had been a part of the paper’s name since its inception, and continues operation as The Salamanca Press. The newspaper would also feature a new look, including a new logo for the first time since 1949.

Nov. 5, 1984 The Salamanca Press announces its newspaper, along with the Salamanca Pennysaver, would be relocated under one roof. The offices of The Press were increased by 1,600 square feet for the addition. The Pennysaver offices were previously located at 39 Atlantic St.

Sept. 28, 1991 Kevin Burleson, who had served as a reporter for The Salamanca Press since 1988, is promoted to managing editor. He would serve in the position until 2004.

July 21, 2000 A Bradford, Pa.-led group purchases The Salamanca Press, and the newspaper continues operation under the ownership of Bradford Publishing Co., which continues to publish it today. The newspaper organization also produces the Olean Times Herald and The Bradford Era.

Nov. 15, 2004 Laura Howard is promoted to managing editor of The Salamanca Press, succeeding Kevin Burleson, who stepped away from the position after receiving appointment as Cattaraugus County elections commissioner.

Oct. 12, 2007 Chris Chapman takes over as managing editor and general manager of The Salamanca Press. The Press also announces its completed renovation work to its location at 36 River St.

Jan. 7, 2010 The first weekly edition of The Salamanca Press prints after nearly 106 years as a daily newspaper. It had been reported at the time The Press was the smallest daily newspaper in the country. Kip Doyle, previously a reporter at the Olean Times Herald, led the paper’s transition from a five-day daily to a weekly publication.

December 2011 The Salamanca Press returns to being printed at The Bradford Era after being printed at the Olean Times Herald for several years. The paper continues to be printed in Bradford to this day.

June 20, 2011 Rich Place, previously city reporter at The Salamanca Press since January 2010, is promoted to managing editor.

Aug. 19, 2016 The Salamanca Press launches The Gowanda Press, a sister weekly publication, in the communities of Gowanda and Perrysburg.

October 1, 2018 Kellen M. Quigley, previously city reporter at The Salamanca Press since October 2015, is promoted to managing editor.
