= New York–Pennsylvania border =

Geographic boundary between US states

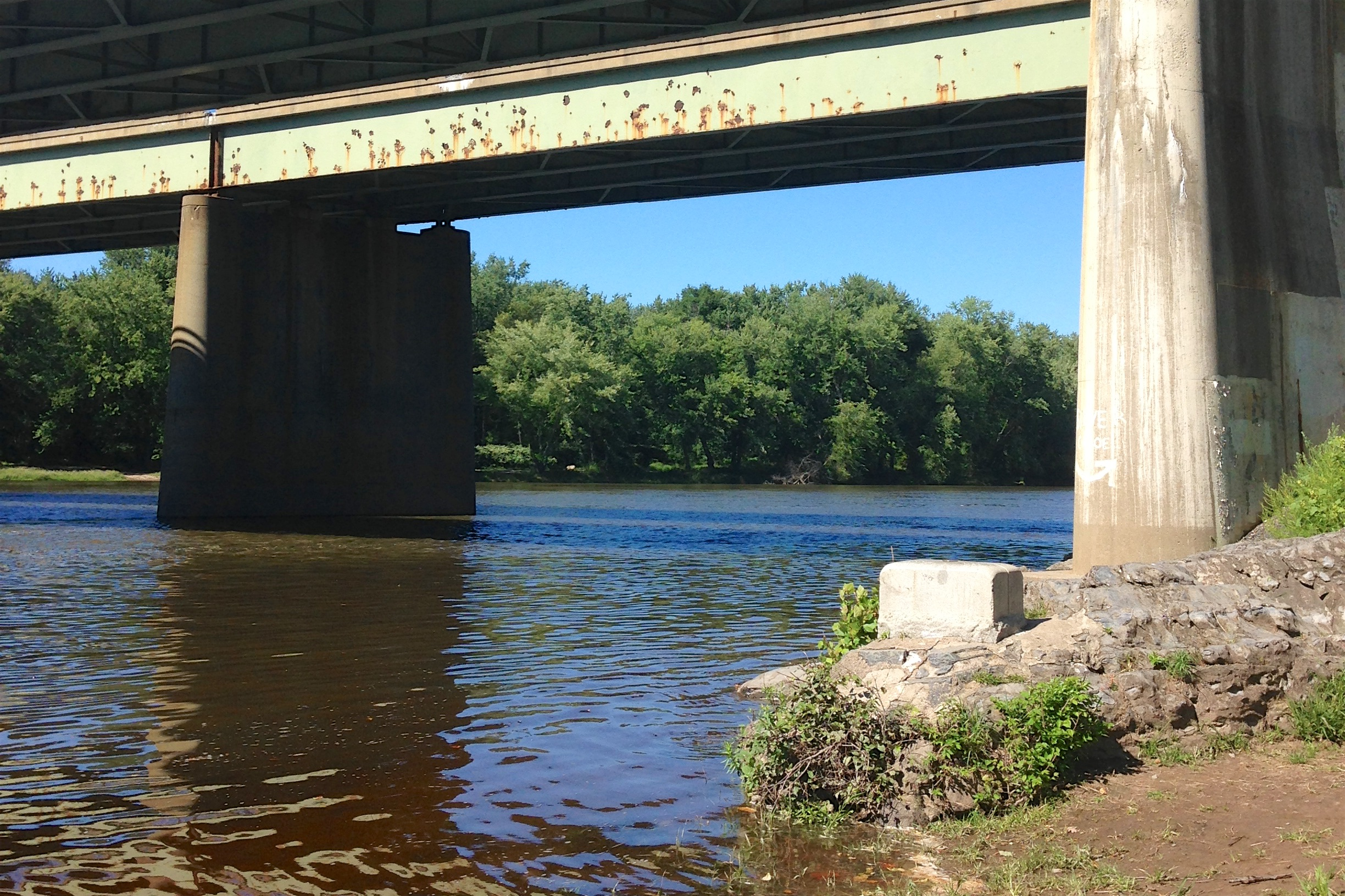
Tri-States Monument, where New York, New Jersey, and Pennsylvania meet. In the background, Interstate 84 crosses between NY and PA just north of the monument.

The New York–Pennsylvania border is the state line between the U.S. states of New York and Pennsylvania. It has three sections:

- Along the center line of the Delaware River from the Tri-States Monument tripoint with New Jersey at the confluence of the Delaware with the Neversink River in Port Jervis, New York to the 42nd parallel north between Hancock, New York and Deposit, New York about 2.8 km downstream from Hale Eddy; above Hancock this is the West branch of the Delaware;
- Across the 42nd parallel north to the corner of the Erie Triangle;
- North along the east boundary of the Erie Triangle to Lake Erie.

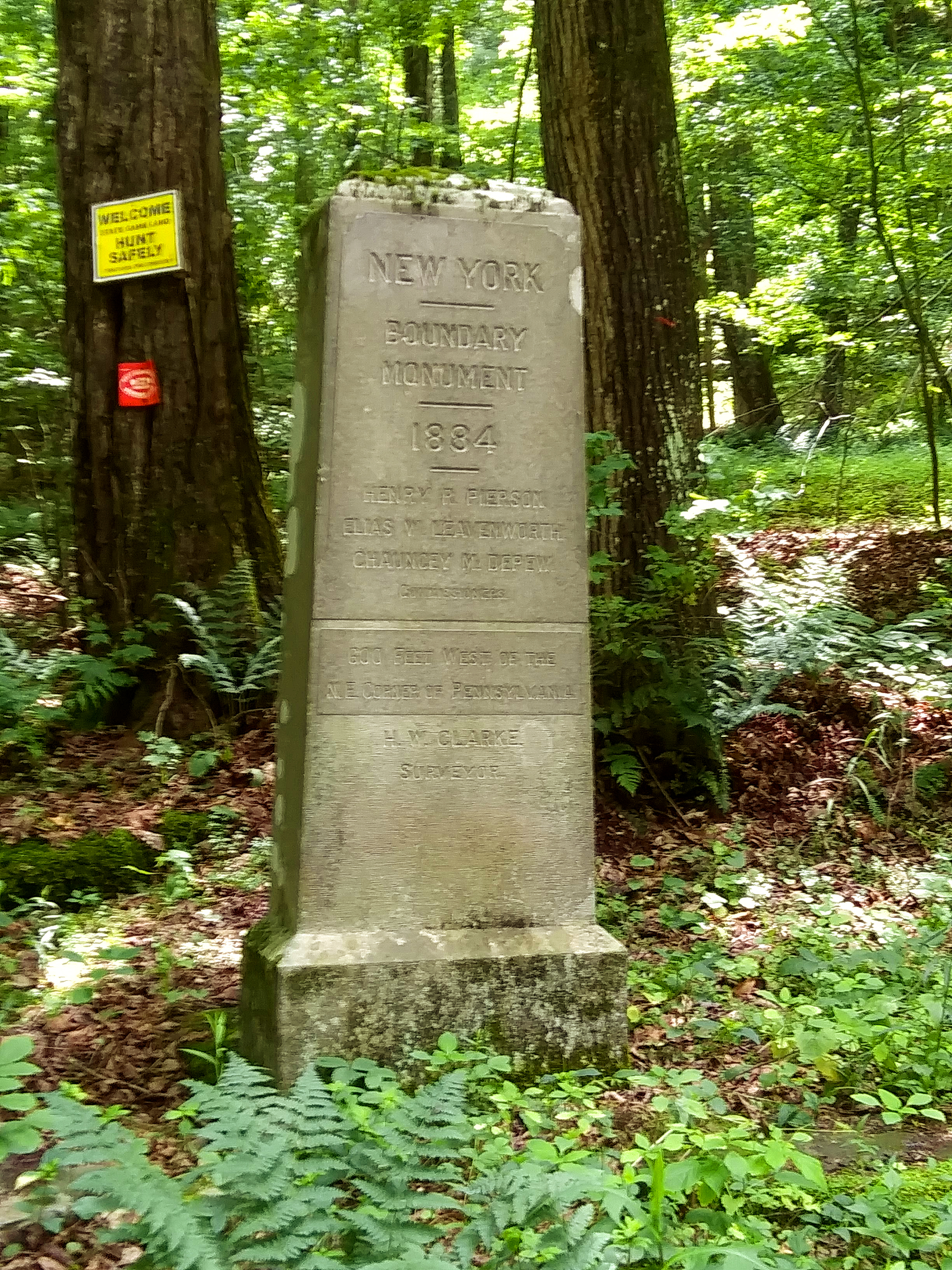
Monument along the 42nd parallel where the state line leaves the West Branch of the Delaware and runs along land

The survey of the 42nd parallel north was carried out in 1785–86 and accepted by the two states in 1787. The surveying technique that was used at the time was not especially accurate, and as such, this boundary wanders a bit on both sides of the true parallel. The 82nd mile stone was used as the starting point of the Preemption Line defined in the Treaty of Hartford in 1786 to separate Massachusetts and New York State land claims in Western New York.

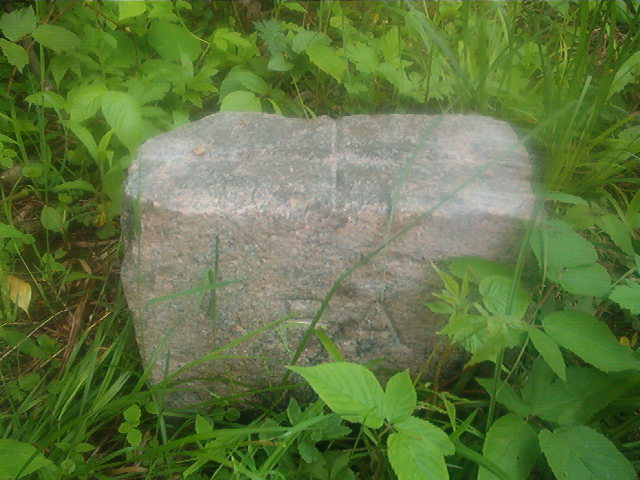
The cornerstone of the Erie Triangle—the westernmost point in the state of New York

The survey of the Erie Triangle boundary in 1789 was by the top surveyor in the United States of the time, Andrew Ellicott.

The starting point of the 42nd parallel north line is in the Delaware River at the northeast corner of Wayne County, Pennsylvania at 41°59′58.4″N 75°21′34.7″W WGS 84. The initial surveyor's monument is just west of Faulkner Road at 41°59′58.4″N 75°21′41.8″W.

The corner point of the Erie Triangle in modern coordinates is 41°59′55.8″N 79°45′43″W.

The distance along the east–west line is approximately 225.86 miles (363.49 km).

The counties that surround the east–west line are known collectively as the Twin Tiers.

== See also ==
- Northern Tier (Pennsylvania)
- Southern Tier (New York)
