= Olean Times Herald =

- Type: Daily newspaper
- Format: Broadsheet
- Owner: Community Media Group
- Editor: Jim Eckstrom
- Founded: 1860
- Headquarters: Olean, New York, United States
- Circulation: 10,694 (as of 2017)
- OCLC number: 757862514
- Website: oleantimesherald.com

The Olean Times Herald is a daily newspaper serving the western Twin Tiers region, based in Olean, New York, United States. The afternoon newspaper, one of the few remaining afternoon papers in the nation, is published by Bradford Publishing and is published six days each week - Monday through Friday, with a special "Weekend Edition" delivered on Saturday mornings. It does not publish on Memorial Day, Independence Day, Labor Day, Thanksgiving, Christmas and New Year's.

It is the flagship of Bradford Publishing's newspaper stable, which includes The Bradford Era (a morning newspaper that mostly serves Pennsylvania), the Salamanca Press (a weekly paper serving Central and Western Cattaraugus County), the Ellicottville Times (a free weekly), and the Fredonia, Gowanda/Silver Creek and Salamanca Pennysavers.

The Thomson Corporation acquired the Olean Times Herald in 1988; they sold the paper, along with 11 other papers, to the American Publishing Company (later Hollinger International) in 1995. Hollinger sold off most of its small papers in 1999, and the Olean Times Herald went to Bradford Publishing. Bradford Publishing Co. is now owned by Community Media Group.

In 2017, Bradford Publishing Co. announced that they had reduced five positions at the Olean Times Herald.

In July 2018, the Bradford Publishing papers were placed behind a soft paywall.

On May 15, 2023, the Monday edition began publishing in a digital-only format. With this change, the print edition now published five days per week (Tuesday to Saturday).

Beginning March 3, 2026, the print edition was reduced to three days per week (Tuesday, Thursday and Saturday). This was due to rising costs and an increasing reader preference for online news. Starting the week of April 13, the digital only format or e-edition was updated to five days per week (Tuesday to Saturday).
