= Erie Triangle =

Tract of land in northwestern Pennsylvania

Coordinates: 42.07°N 80.1°W

- Nickname: The Triangle Lands
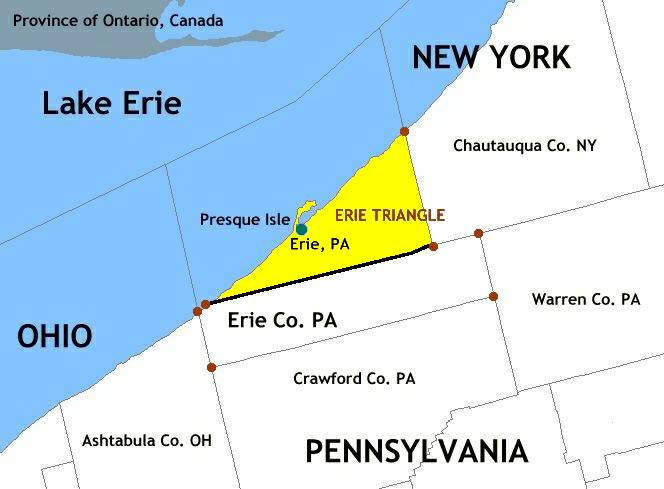
- Black line indicates southern border of Erie Triangle within Erie County
- Country: United States
- State: Pennsylvania
- County: Erie
- Largest city: Erie, Pennsylvania
- Purchased: 1792

Area
  - Total: 300 sq mi (780 km^{2})
- Time zone: UTC−5 (EST)
  - Summer (DST): UTC−4 (EDT)

The Erie Triangle is a roughly 300-square-mile (780-square-kilometre) tract of land that was the subject of several competing colonial-era claims. It was eventually acquired by the U.S. federal government and sold to Pennsylvania so that the state would have access to a freshwater port on Lake Erie. The Erie Triangle land makes up a large portion of present-day Erie County, Pennsylvania.

== Background ==
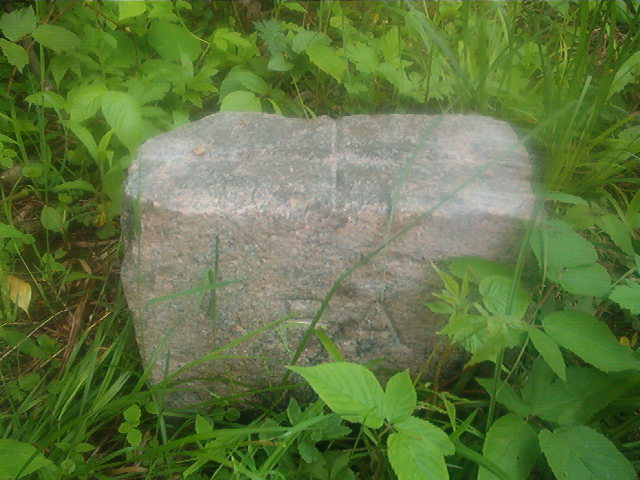
Cornerstone of the Erie Triangle

Most of northwestern Pennsylvania came under American control following the 1784 Treaty of Fort Stanwix with the Iroquois Confederacy. The following year, a boundary dispute between New York and Pennsylvania erupted. Following a surveying effort by Andrew Ellicott representing the Pennsylvanians and James Clinton and Simeon DeWitt representing the New Yorkers, the western edge of New York was set at 20 miles (32 km) east of Pennsylvania's Presque Isle, a small peninsula off the coast of Erie, Pennsylvania. However, this left an unclaimed area, which came to be known as the Triangle Lands.

The Triangle Lands problematically fell under neither New York's nor Pennsylvania's charter, while both Connecticut and Massachusetts also spoke up with claims derived from their original colonial "sea to shining sea" grants.

Of the three competing claimants (Pennsylvania, Connecticut, and Massachusetts), only Pennsylvania was landlocked, except for a very tiny strip of coastline 3.75 miles (6.04 km) in length. Following some pressure from the new federal government, all three states surrendered their claims to that entity, which then, in 1792, sold the final rights to the 202,187 acres (81,822 ha) of land to Pennsylvania for $151,640.25 (75¢/acre). (Note: equivalent to $3,777,244 in 2025 ($18.68 per acre)) The Six Nations of the Iroquois Confederacy released the land to Pennsylvania in January 1789 for payments of $2,000 from Pennsylvania (Note: equivalent to $54,048 in 2025) and $1,200 from the federal government. (Note: equivalent to $32,429 in 2025) The Seneca Nation separately settled land claims against Pennsylvania in February 1791 for $800. (Note: equivalent to $20,280 in 2025) This was accomplished without the approval of the federal government and in violation of the Contract Clause of the United States Constitution which reserved the right to make treaties to the federal government. With this access to the Great Lakes, Pennsylvania was persuaded to accept the western boundary established by the Surveyor General of the Northwest Territory following passage of the Northwest Ordinance in 1787.

The Erie Triangle is often described as a "tab" or "chimney" attached to the Keystone State. The water off the coast of the Erie Triangle is known as the Graveyard of Lake Erie because of the large number of shipwrecks that occurred in the area's stormy waters in the 18th and 19th centuries. It was also the site of a preliminary battle between forces that participated in the Battle of Lake Erie during the War of 1812. The battle itself took place in the Lake Erie Islands, at the western end of the lake, off the coast of Ohio.

== See also ==
- Twin Tiers
  - Northern Tier
  - Southern Tier
- New York–Pennsylvania border
- Pennamite–Yankee War

== Sources ==
- Bates, Samuel P. (1884). History of Erie County, Pennsylvania. Chicago: Warner, Beers and Company.
