= Alma Hill =

Mountain in New York, United States

- Location within New York Adirondack Park Location within the United States

Highest point
- Elevation: 2,543 feet (775 m)
- Coordinates: 42°02′58″N 78°00′44″W

Geography
- Location: SW of Wellsville, Allegany County, New York, U.S.
- Topo map: USGS Allentown

Alma Hill is a 2,543-foot-tall (775 m) mountain in the Southern Tier of New York. It is located southwest of Wellsville in Allegany County. In 1950, an 80-foot-tall (24 m) steel fire lookout tower was built on the mountain. Due to the increased use of aerial detection, the tower ceased fire lookout operations at the end of the 1971 fire lookout season. In 1973, the tower was sold to the landowner where the tower stood. It is the highest hill in western New York, or the highest in New York outside the Adirondacks and Catskills.

== History ==
In 1950, the Conservation Department built an 80-foot-tall (24 m) Aermotor LS40 steel fire lookout tower on the mountain. In addition to the tower, a 1941 model observer cabin was constructed at the same time. This tower, like many in the Southern Tier, was added to protect large holdings of state forest lands, and not to be part of the close-knit system of towers in the Adirondacks and Catskills. Due to the increased use of aerial detection, the tower ceased fire lookout operations at the end of the 1971 fire lookout season. In 1973, the tower was offered for sale at a public auction, with the high bidder being the landowner where the tower stood. This tower is one of the few remaining towers in New York to bear a manufacturer tag located on one of the legs that reads "Aermotor Co.—Chicago Ill".
