= Northern Tier (Pennsylvania) =

Region of Pennsylvania

Coordinates: 41.842°N 76.085°W

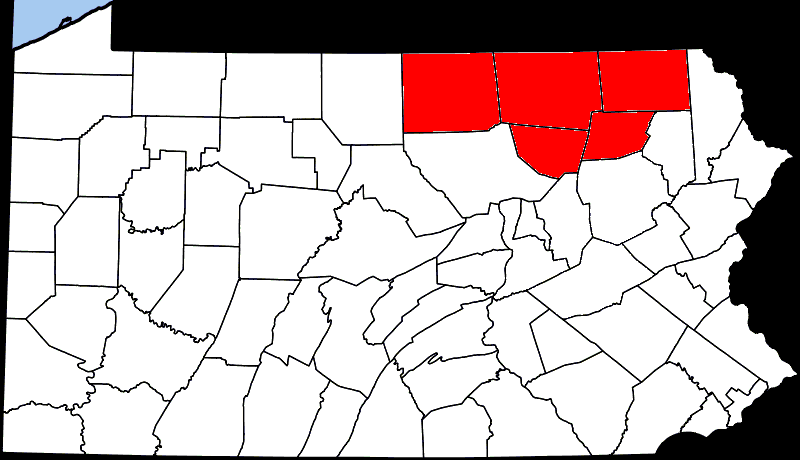
Counties comprising the Northern Tier Region of Pennsylvania

The Northern Tier is a geographic region consisting of five rural counties in north-central Pennsylvania.

== Geography ==
The region is bordered to the north by the Southern Tier of New York state. Together, these regions are known as the Twin Tiers.

The counties and important towns in the Northern Tier are:

- Bradford
  - Athens
  - Sayre
  - Towanda
- Sullivan
  - Dushore
  - Laporte
- Susquehanna
  - Forest City
  - Montrose
  - New Milford
- Tioga
  - Mansfield
  - Wellsboro
- Wyoming
  - Tunkhannock

The region is bounded to the north by the Southern Tier of New York, to the west by Northern Pennsylvania, and to the east by Northeastern Pennsylvania.

== Population ==
The five Northern Tier counties are home to roughly 180,000 people distributed among many small towns and the countryside.

The largest town is Sayre which is located on the left-east bank of the North Branch Susquehanna River and is on Interstate 86 where it dips just south of the New York state line.

== Transportation ==
U.S. Route 220, U.S. Route 15 and U.S. Route 6 cross the region.

Sayre Yard is a large railyard currently operated by Norfolk Southern Railroad that extends across the state line into Waverly, New York and connects rail transport centers via Wilkes-Barre, Pennsylvania, to freight yards in Philadelphia, Harrisburg, and Baltimore to Buffalo and other Upstate New York cities as well as the Great Lakes basin cities.

== Notable features ==
The Endless Mountains are a major geographic feature of the eastern counties.

== Education ==
The region is home to Mansfield University of Pennsylvania, located in Mansfield.

== Economy ==
The Northern Tier region as a whole is notorious for its high unemployment and low per-capita incomes in comparison to the rest of Pennsylvania, though the discovery of the Marcellus Formation provided an economic boost in the 2000s and 2010s. The region's top two employers are government-funded services, specifically health care and education services.

Agriculture is an important activity in the region despite the short growing season and hilly terrain. Small-scale beef and dairy farming is common, and there are many small-scale producers of maple syrup in the region.

Production of crude oil and natural gas are important to the local economy. The characteristics of Pennsylvania Grade Crude Oil make it especially desirable for high-end uses.

Logging, forest product industries and paper product industries are significant parts of the region's economy.

Agriculture and light manufacturing are also important employers.

== See also ==
- Twin Tiers
- Southern Tier
- Erie Triangle
- New York-Pennsylvania border

== Sources ==
- Northern Tier Regional Planning and Development Commission
