= Southern Tier =

Region in New York state

Coordinates: 42°12′N 77°10′W

Southern Tier of New York
- Region
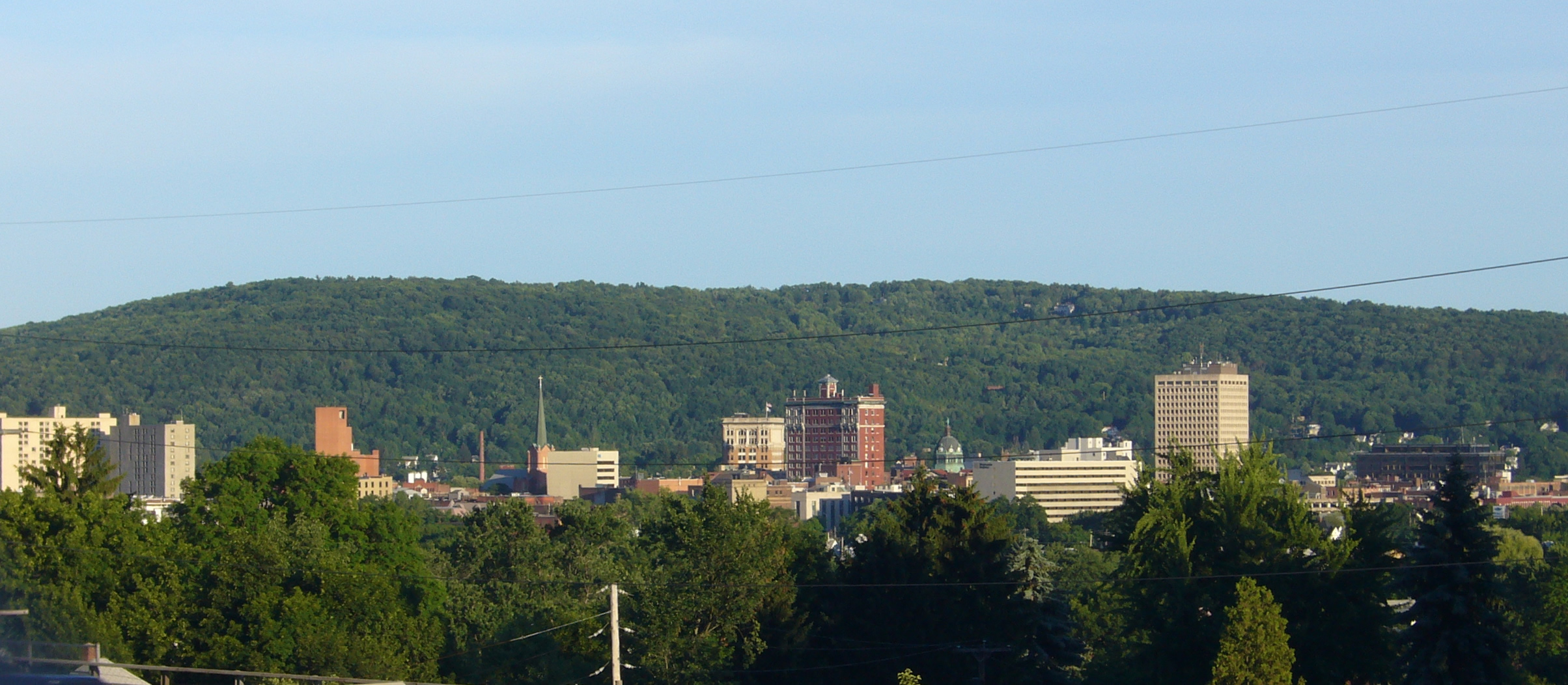
- Skyline of Binghamton, New York

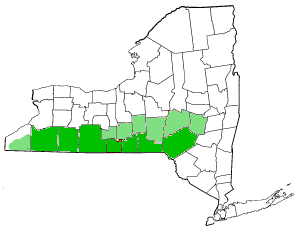
- Core Southern Tier counties Peripheral counties
- Country: United States
- State: New York
- Region: Upstate New York
- Counties: Allegany, Broome, Cattaraugus, Chautauqua, Chemung, Chenango, Cortland, Delaware, Otsego, Schoharie, Schuyler, Steuben, Tioga, Tompkins
- Major cities: Binghamton, Corning, Elmira, Hornell, Ithaca, Jamestown, Olean, Owego

Population (2024)
  - Total: 1,013,290
- Time zone: UTC-5 (EST)
  - Summer (DST): UTC-4 (Eastern Daylight Time)
- Area codes: 607, 585, 716

The Southern Tier is a geographic subregion of the broader upstate region of New York State, geographically situated along or very near the state border with Pennsylvania. Definitions of the region vary widely, but generally encompass counties surrounding the Binghamton, Elmira-Corning, and Jamestown metropolitan areas, along with the land of the Seneca Nation. This region is adjacent to the Northern Tier of Pennsylvania, and both these regions together are known as the Twin Tiers.

Geographically, most of the Southern Tier resides in the Allegheny Plateau of the Appalachian Mountains, with the eastern areas of the region nestled in the western portion of the Catskill Mountains. A longtime home of the Haudenosaunee Confederacy, European settlers moved to the region after the American Revolutionary War. The fertile yet hilly land, combined with sweeping river valleys, led the region to support a combination of manufacturing industries (including large companies such as IBM and Corning Inc.) and farming, but with less development compared to neighboring subregions of upstate. Since the 1950s, the area is often considered to be a part of the Rust Belt, as manufacturing jobs have left the region.

== Definition and constituent counties ==
As is the case with many regions in New York State, there is no legal definition of the Southern Tier, resulting a lack of consensus about which counties belong to the region. One of the broadest definitions of the Southern Tier is from the New York State Department of State, which classifies the following 14 counties as members of the Southern Tier:

- Allegany County
- Broome County
- Cattaraugus County
- Chautauqua County
- Chemung County
- Chenango County
- Cortland County
- Delaware County
- Otsego County
- Schoharie County
- Schuyler County
- Steuben County
- Tioga County
- Tompkins County

This definition corresponds to the same 14 counties in New York State that are members of the Appalachian Regional Commission. Based on this definition, the Southern Tier partially overlaps with the Western New York, Finger Lakes, and Mohawk Valley regions. Less expansive definitions can vary widely, such as the eight-county region defined by the state's Empire State Development Corporation or the four-county region in the Encyclopedia of New York State.

Much of the Southern Tier is in area code 607, with the exception of Allegany, Cattaraugus, and Chautauqua Counties, which are in area code 716 or area code 585. As of 2023, the westernmost portion of the Southern Tier is located in New York's 23rd congressional district, and the easternmost portion is located in New York's 19th congressional district. The ZIP code prefixes 137 – 139 (Binghamton region), 147 (Jamestown region), and 148 – 149 (Elmira region) are set aside for the Southern Tier.

== Geography ==
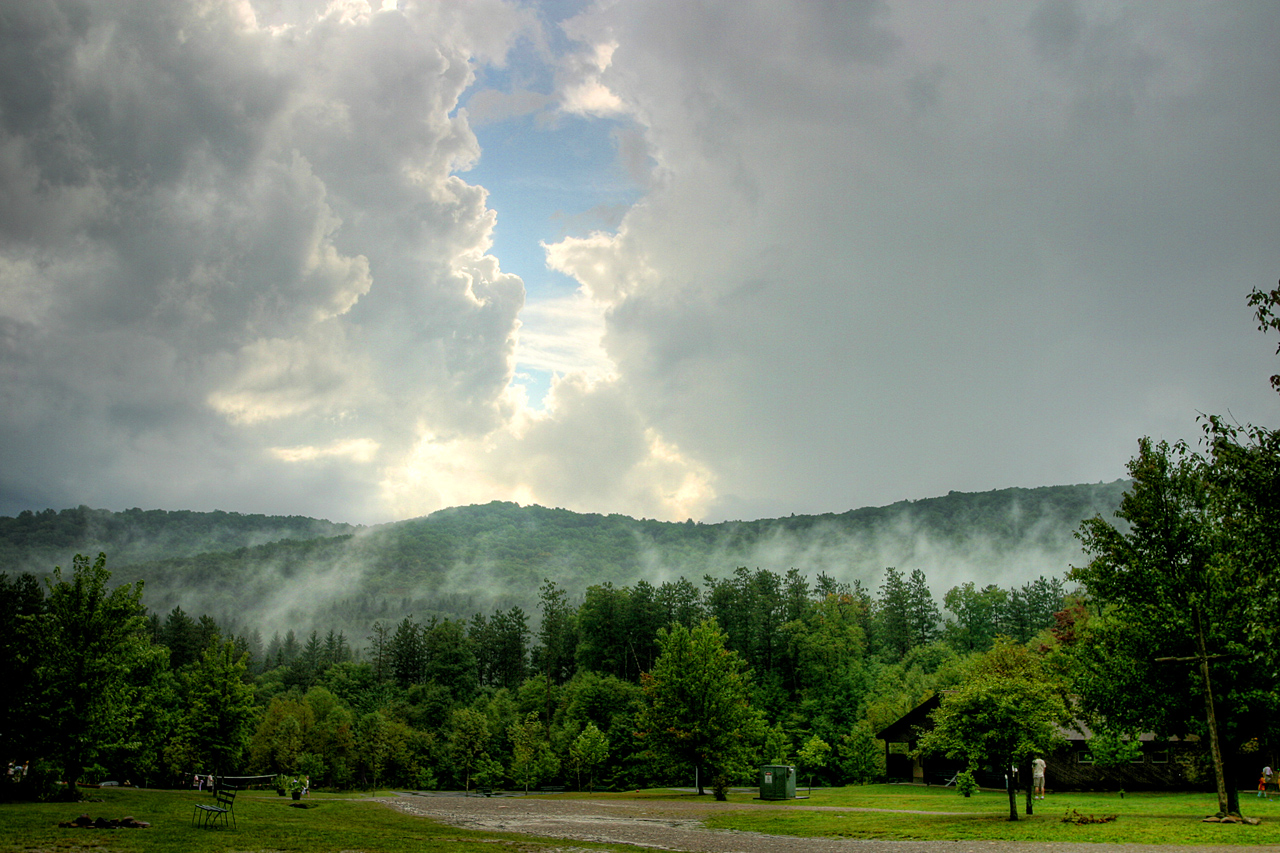
Allegany State Park

The Southern Tier is generally hilly without being mountainous (with the exception of the Catskill mountains). This can range from low rolling hills to more steep and rugged cliffs and valleys. The highest point in western New York is Alma Hill in Allegany County near the Steuben County line in the Southern Tier. Both the Delaware and Susquehanna rivers flow through the Southern Tier in their upper reaches, as does the Allegheny River in the western Southern Tier.

The Southern Tier makes up the northernmost portion of Appalachia and lies on the Allegheny Plateau. It is defined on its western boundary by the Chautauqua Ridge in Chautauqua County, and including this ridge and extending eastward across the northern bounds of the region, the continental divide between the Great Lakes and the Mississippi River watersheds exists. The Eastern Continental Divide runs directly through the region, in Steuben County.

The Southern Tier is more geographically linked with Pennsylvania and the Susquehanna River valley, at its confluence with the Chemung River, than it is with the remainder of New York State. Historically, the population of the Southern Tier came primarily from Pennsylvania, New Jersey, and downstate New York ("Yorkers"). In contrast, the inhabitants of upper New York State came from New England ("Yankees").

The Southern Tier is home to the Catskill Mountains and Allegany State Park. Allegany State Park is on the south end of Cattaraugus County on the Pennsylvania Border. It is located just south of Salamanca, New York and is home to the hamlet of Red House, New York. Allegany State Park is affectionately referred to as “Allegany” by frequent park-goers. Allegany has many mountains and great tourist spots like Stone Tower and Thunder Rocks.

== History ==
The Southern Tier has long been home to the people of the Haudenosaunee Confederacy. There were major settlements along the Allegheny River in Cattaraugus County (which the Senecas acquired by defeating the Wenrohronon during the Beaver Wars in 1638) and at Painted Post in Steuben County, at what is today the northeast side of Corning, New York. The Seneca Nation has a reservation today along the Allegheny River and a headquarters at Salamanca. There are also native lands (with no current native residents) on Cuba Lake in Allegany County.

The colonies that eventually became the states of New York, Massachusetts and Pennsylvania all laid claim to the Southern Tier at various points in the 17th and 18th centuries, while not making any significant attempt to settle the territory.

The region was quickly settled by European descendants after the Revolutionary War, when settlers were again allowed west of the Appalachian divide. The Southern Tier shared in the economic growth of the early 19th century, but its hilly terrain made it less suitable to canal-building, and later, railroading, than the more-level corridor to the north between Albany and Buffalo. There was an attempt at a Genesee Valley Canal in the western half, and in the eastern half, the Chemung and Chenango Canals did connect the Erie Canal to Elmira and Binghamton respectively. Beset by financial and technical difficulties, the latter two canals nonetheless were important catalysts for economic growth, and indeed for the construction of the railroads that would supplant them. Plans to connect these canals to the Pennsylvania Canal system, thus making them much more than feeders to the Erie Canal, never came to fruition.

Railroads did arrive and the Erie Railroad, which followed the water-level of the Allegheny, Susquehanna and Delaware watersheds, accelerated industrial progress in the region about the time of the American Civil War. The railroad and available fuel from the region's dense forests attracted Corning Glass Works to Steuben County in 1868.

The region became home to prosperous farms and small factory towns (with the exception of larger Binghamton) during the first half of the 20th century. But declines in U.S. manufacturing hit the region hard and it suffered even more than other parts of upstate New York and northern Pennsylvania.

The region's addition to the Appalachian Regional Commission, often credited to the influence of U.S. Sen. Robert F. Kennedy, provided economic stimulus over the last forty years. Government funds built the Southern Tier Expressway and highway links to the New York State Thruway, encouraged the growth of state colleges at Wellsville, Alfred and Binghamton and sought with mixed success to attract business interests relocating from the New York Metropolitan Area and urban Western New York.

For two decades, the region has tried to remake itself as a tourist destination and relocation area for retirees from big Northeastern cities. Meanwhile, agriculture and manufacturing struggle to compete regionally and globally.

== Education ==
Binghamton University (the State University of New York-Binghamton) is one of the SUNY system's four University Centers. Other 4-year and graduate institutions within the core counties include St. Bonaventure University, Alfred University, Elmira College, and Houghton College. Technical and community colleges include Alfred State College, Broome Community College, Corning Community College, and the State University of New York at Delhi. The region is also home to E.B.I. Career College, a vocational school.

Institutions of higher learning outside the core counties include Cornell University, Hartwick College, Ithaca College, SUNY Colleges in Cortland and Oneonta, Jamestown Community College, Fredonia, and Tompkins Cortland Community College.

== Transportation ==
Southern Tier Expressway route marker

The Southern Tier Expressway—Interstate 86 and New York State Route 17 together—serves the Southern Tier. The highway is the region's major corridor and connects to U.S. Route 219 in Salamanca, Interstate 390 in Bath, Interstate 99 in Corning, U.S. Route 220 in Waverly, and Interstates 81 and 88 in Binghamton.

The region is served by three regional airports. Elmira-Corning Regional Airport has routes to Atlanta, Washington D.C., Detroit, and several destinations in Florida. The Greater Binghamton Airport offers Delta Air Lines flights to Detroit. Chautauqua County-Jamestown Airport connects to Pittsburgh via Essential Air Service.

Bus service is provided along the entire I-86/NY 17 corridor by Coach USA's Shortline/Erie services from Jamestown to New York City and Buffalo, and Trailways connects the Southern Tier with Buffalo, Dubois (at the western end in Salamanca), Sunbury/Lock Haven (at Elmira), and Syracuse, Albany and Harrisburg (at Binghamton). A somewhat-unorganized network of municipally-operated public transportation services operate local and limited intercity bus services between Salamanca and Elmira.

Until the demise of long-distance passenger rail service in the United States in the 1950s and 1960s, the Erie Railroad operated passenger trains in the region, with Chicago, Illinois as the western terminus and Jersey City, New Jersey as the eastern terminus, with ferry connections to New York City. The last Erie Lackawanna passenger train, the "Lake Cities", ran on January 6, 1970.

Amtrak currently does not serve the area. Proposals for high-speed rail in New York have included a route from Binghamton to New York City through Scranton, Pennsylvania: a route that could at least partially be upgraded for high-speed rail. As of 2011, the highest priority for high-speed rail projects in New York is in the Empire Corridor, of which no part crosses the Southern Tier. The hilly terrain of the Southern Tier's I-86 corridor is not ideal for high-speed rail service, especially compared to the relatively flat and straight land in the Empire Corridor.

== Economy ==
Government services are the largest employer in the area. Of second and declining importance is manufacturing. The region's manufacturing economy has suffered for decades, but factories are found in the region's larger communities. Fortune 500 materials maker Corning Inc. is headquartered in Steuben County. Broome County has a large high-tech industry and is the birthplace of IBM and flight simulation. In addition, other factories in the region make military aircraft, televisions, furniture, metal forgings and machine tools.

The area includes the northern extent of the Marcellus Formation and natural gas. Crude oil and oil sands continue to be extracted from Southern Tier wells as they have for over a century. There is significant debate about allowing hydraulic fracturing of the Marcellus Shale in the Southern Tier, which is currently banned in New York.

Cummins engine company has a large production facility located in Jamestown, NY. The Jamestown Engine Plant, established in 1974, is one of the top five heavy-duty diesel engine producers worldwide with production in recent years typically exceeding 100,000 engines annually. The JEP also remains one of the company's largest manufacturing facilities, as it accounts for 12 percent of Cummins' total engine production in 2012.

Agriculture is also a major part of the economy. Leading products are dairy, vegetables, orchard fruit and wine grapes (the last of which typically grows only on the fringes of the Southern Tier, as the inland areas tend to not have a long enough growing season to support it). In addition, two prominent microbreweries, the Southern Tier Brewing Company in Lakewood, New York and the Ellicottville Brewing Company in Ellicottville, operate in the western Southern Tier.

The western and northern edges of the Southern Tier are known as ski country, and the hilly terrain (that forms a continental divide known as the Chautauqua Ridge) is notorious for frequent and heavy lake effect snow. As a result, Ellicottville has become a "ski town" with both the Holimont and Holiday Valley resorts in the vicinity; the two resorts draw numerous tourists, particularly from Canada, for which U.S. Route 219 provides easy access. At its peak in the 1960s, over a dozen ski resorts resided in the Southern Tier, many in Cattaraugus County, before most of them closed due to various assorted causes by the 1980s.

== Culture ==
The Southern Tier is home to two professional symphony orchestras: the Binghamton Philharmonic in Binghamton and the Orchestra of the Southern Finger Lakes in Corning. Binghamton also has the Binghamton Youth Symphony and the Binghamton Community Orchestra.

The Tri-Cities Opera Company present full-scale operas in Binghamton.

== Media and entertainment ==
Most of the Southern Tier is either served by the Elmira-Corning television market or the Binghamton television market. Cattaraugus and Allegany Counties are out of these stations' ranges, however, and are instead served by the Buffalo and Erie television markets. Two stations (more-or-less independent WVTT-CD and Retro Television Network owned-and-operated translator WBUO-LD) are licensed to Olean but serve Buffalo in practice.

The Olean, Elmira-Corning, and Binghamton radio markets directly serve the Southern Tier, and the Ithaca market indirectly serves some of the area. Seven Mountains Media is the dominant broadcaster in Olean and Elmira-Corning. iHeartMedia and Cumulus Media own station clusters only in Binghamton.

Notable newspapers include The Leader of Corning, the Elmira Star-Gazette, the Binghamton Press & Sun-Bulletin, Hornell Evening Tribune, the Wellsville Daily Reporter, the Olean Times Herald, the Salamanca Press, The Post-Journal of Jamestown, and The Observer of Dunkirk. The Tribune, Reporter and Leader are all owned by GateHouse Media; Gannett Company owns the Star-Gazette and Press & Sun-Bulletin.

The Southern Tier has an eclectic history of sports. From 1979 to 2009 the LPGA Corning Classic was held at the Corning Country Club. Endicott's En-Joie Golf Course hosted a PGA Tour event, the B.C. Open, from 1971 until 2006. It then became the Dick's Sporting Goods Open which is a PGA Tour Champions event still played each summer. Binghamton has a AA baseball team, the Binghamton Rumble Ponies, and a Federal Prospects Hockey League franchise, the Binghamton Black Bears. Depending on the boundary definition, Watkins Glen International Speedway, a NASCAR and Indy Racing League sanctioned road racing track, is located in the Southern Tier region.

From 2000 to 2017, Elmira had a professional ice hockey team in the Elmira Jackals. They played in the United Hockey League from 2000 to 2007 and the ECHL for the franchise's remaining years. The Jackals were replaced by a new Federal Hockey League franchise called the Elmira Enforcers from 2018 to 2021. The last minor league baseball team in the Southern Tier west of Binghamton, the Jamestown Jammers, relocated out of the area in 2016, ending an era in which the New York–Penn League featured pro teams in Jamestown, Olean, Wellsville, Hornell, Corning, Elmira and Oneonta over the course of its history; collegiate summer baseball still thrives in the region in the form of the New York Collegiate Baseball League and Perfect Game Collegiate Baseball League, both with multiple teams in the region, and Town Team Baseball also operated in the form of the Southwestern New York Men's Baseball League from 2014 to 2016. Only one major league franchise has ever resided in the Southern Tier: the professional basketball team Elmira Colonels, which played from 1952 to 1953.

== See also ==
- Twin Tiers
- Northern Tier (Pennsylvania)
- Erie Triangle
- New York-Pennsylvania border
- New York's 23rd congressional district
