= 42nd parallel north =

Circle of latitude

42nd parallel north (interactive map)

The 42nd parallel north is a circle of latitude that is 42 degrees north of the Earth's equatorial plane. It crosses Europe, the Mediterranean Sea, Asia, the Pacific Ocean, North America, and the Atlantic Ocean.

At this latitude the sun is visible for 15 hours, 15 minutes during the summer solstice and 9 hours, 6 minutes during the winter solstice.

The earth's rotational speed at this latitude is roughly equal to the speed of sound.

One minute of longitude along the 42nd parallel is approximately 0.7456 nautical miles (0.8580 mi; 1.381 km).

== Around the world ==
Starting at the Prime Meridian and heading eastwards, the parallel 42° north passes through:

Coordinates	Country, territory or sea	Notes
42°0′N 0°0′E	Spain	Passing near Laluenga and Laperdiguera (Huesca province)
42°0′N 3°11′E	Mediterranean Sea	
42°0′N 8°39′E	France	Island of Corsica
42°0′N 9°27′E	Mediterranean Sea	Tyrrhenian Sea
42°0′N 11°58′E	Italy	Passing just north of Rome and through Termoli
42°0′N 15°0′E	Mediterranean Sea	Adriatic Sea
42°0′N 19°9′E	Montenegro	
42°0′N 19°23′E	Albania	
42°0′N 20°37′E	Kosovo or Serbia	Kosovo is a partially recognised state. Some nations consider its territory to be part of Serbia.
42°0′N 20°46′E	North Macedonia	Passing through Skopje
42°0′N 22°52′E	Bulgaria	
42°0′N 26°56′E	Turkey	
42°0′N 27°25′E	Bulgaria	
42°0′N 27°51′E	Turkey	For about 300 m
42°0′N 27°51.42′E	Bulgaria	For about 100 m
42°0′N 27°51.52′E	Turkey	For about 500 m
42°0′N 27°52.08′E	Bulgaria	
42°0′N 28°2′E	Black Sea	
42°0′N 33°17′E	Turkey	
42°0′N 33°34′E	Black Sea	
42°0′N 34°52′E	Turkey	
42°0′N 35°7′E	Black Sea	
42°0′N 41°45′E	Georgia	
42°0′N 46°5′E	Russia	Dagestan - For about 2 km
42°0′N 46°7′E	Georgia	For about 3 km
42°0′N 46°9′E	Russia	Dagestan just south of Derbent
42°0′N 48°20′E	Caspian Sea	
42°0′N 52°27′E	Kazakhstan	
42°0′N 52°48′E	Turkmenistan	
42°0′N 54°51′E	Kazakhstan	
42°0′N 56°0′E	Uzbekistan	
42°0′N 57°10′E	Turkmenistan	
42°0′N 60°0′E	Uzbekistan	
42°0′N 66°0′E	Kazakhstan	
42°0′N 70°20′E	Uzbekistan	
42°0′N 70°50′E	Kyrgyzstan	
42°0′N 79°50′E	China	Xinjiang; Gansu; Inner Mongolia
42°0′N 103°3′E	Mongolia	
42°0′N 105°56′E	China	Inner Mongolia; Hebei; Inner Mongolia; Hebei; Inner Mongolia; Hebei; Inner Mongolia; Liaoning; Inner Mongolia; Liaoning; Jilin
42°0′N 128°3′E	North Korea	Passing through Heaven Lake on Baekdu Mountain
42°0′N 128°29′E	China	Jilin (for about 8 km)
42°0′N 128°34′E	North Korea	North Hamgyeong Province - Kaema Plateau: Passing just north of Cheongjin; Passing just south of Raseon
42°0′N 130°2′E	Sea of Japan	Passing just south of Okushiri Island, Japan
42°0′N 140°7′E	Japan	Island of Hokkaidō
42°0′N 140°53′E	Pacific Ocean	
42°0′N 143°9′E	Japan	Island of Hokkaidō
42°0′N 143°15′E	Pacific Ocean	
42°0′N 124°13′W	United States	Oregon / California border Oregon / Nevada border Idaho / Nevada border Idaho / Utah border Wyoming; Nebraska; Iowa - passing through Cedar Rapids; Illinois - passing through the campus of Loyola University in Chicago
42°0′N 87°39′W	Lake Michigan	
42°0′N 86°33′W	United States	Michigan - passing through Tecumseh
42°0′N 83°11′W	Lake Erie	
42°0′N 82°58′W	Canada	Ontario - passing through Point Pelee National Park
42°0′N 82°29′W	Lake Erie	
42°0′N 80°26′W	United States	Pennsylvania (Erie County); New York / Pennsylvania border New York; Connecticut - running just south of the border with Massachusetts; Rhode Island - running just south of the border with Massachusetts; Massachusetts
42°0′N 70°42′W	Cape Cod Bay	
42°0′N 70°5′W	United States	Massachusetts (Truro, Cape Cod)
42°0′N 70°2′W	Atlantic Ocean	
42°0′N 8°53′W	Spain	Oia (province of Pontevedra, Galicia)
42°0′N 8°39′W	Portugal	Valença (Viana do Castelo District)
42°0′N 8°7′W	Spain	Entrimo (province of Ourense, Galicia)
42°0′N 3°48′W	Spain	Lerma, Province of Burgos (Castile and León)

== United States ==
The 42nd parallel north defining borders between states in the United States

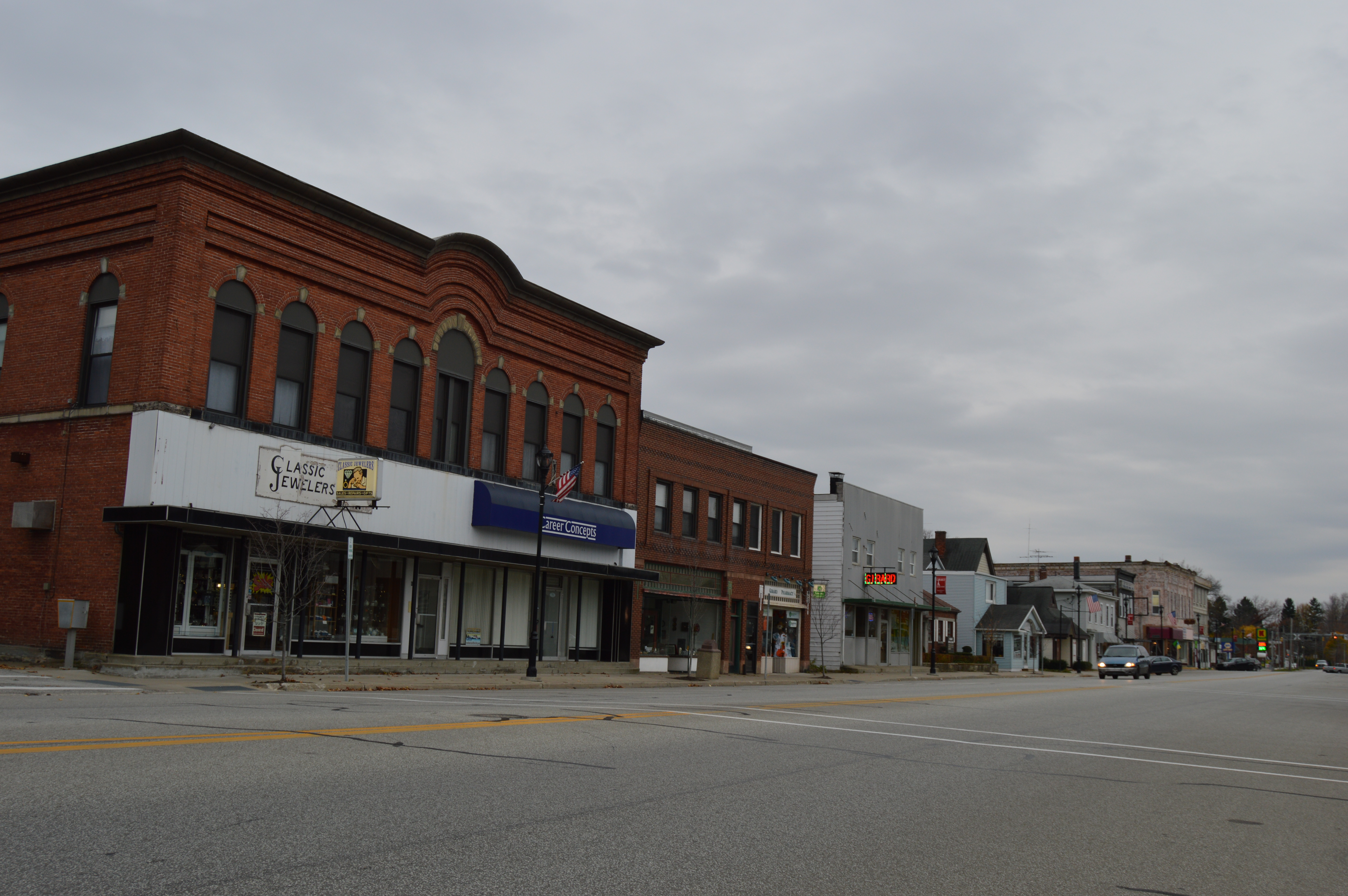
Crossing the parallel in Girard, Pennsylvania

The parallel 42° north forms most of the New York–Pennsylvania border, although due to imperfect surveying in 1785–1786, this boundary wanders around on both sides of the true parallel. The area around the parallel in this region is known as the Twin Tiers.

The 42nd parallel became agreed upon as the northward limit of the Spanish Empire by the Adams–Onís Treaty of 1819 with the United States, which established the parallel as the border between the Viceroyalty of New Spain of the Kingdom of Spain and the western territory of the United States of America from the meridian of the headwaters of the Arkansas River west to the Pacific Ocean. The Treaty of Guadalupe Hidalgo of 1848 then ceded much of what was then northern Mexico to the United States; as a result, the northernmost U.S. states which were entirely created from Mexican territory (California, Nevada, and Utah) have the parallel 42° north as their border with the U.S. states of Oregon and Idaho.

The parallel passes through the states of Wyoming, Nebraska, Iowa, Illinois, Michigan, Pennsylvania, New York, Connecticut, Rhode Island and Massachusetts, and passes through (or near – within three-tenths degree of latitude) the following cities in the United States:

- Crescent City, California
- Yreka, California
- Hartford, Connecticut
- Ames, Iowa
- Chicago, Illinois
- Kalamazoo, Michigan
- Coldwater, Michigan
- Erie, Pennsylvania
- Jamestown, New York
- Busti, New York
- Binghamton, New York
- Plymouth, Massachusetts
- Springfield, Massachusetts
- Worcester, Massachusetts
- Foxborough, Massachusetts
- Ashland, Oregon
- Medford, Oregon
- Providence, Rhode Island
- Brookings, Oregon

== Canada ==
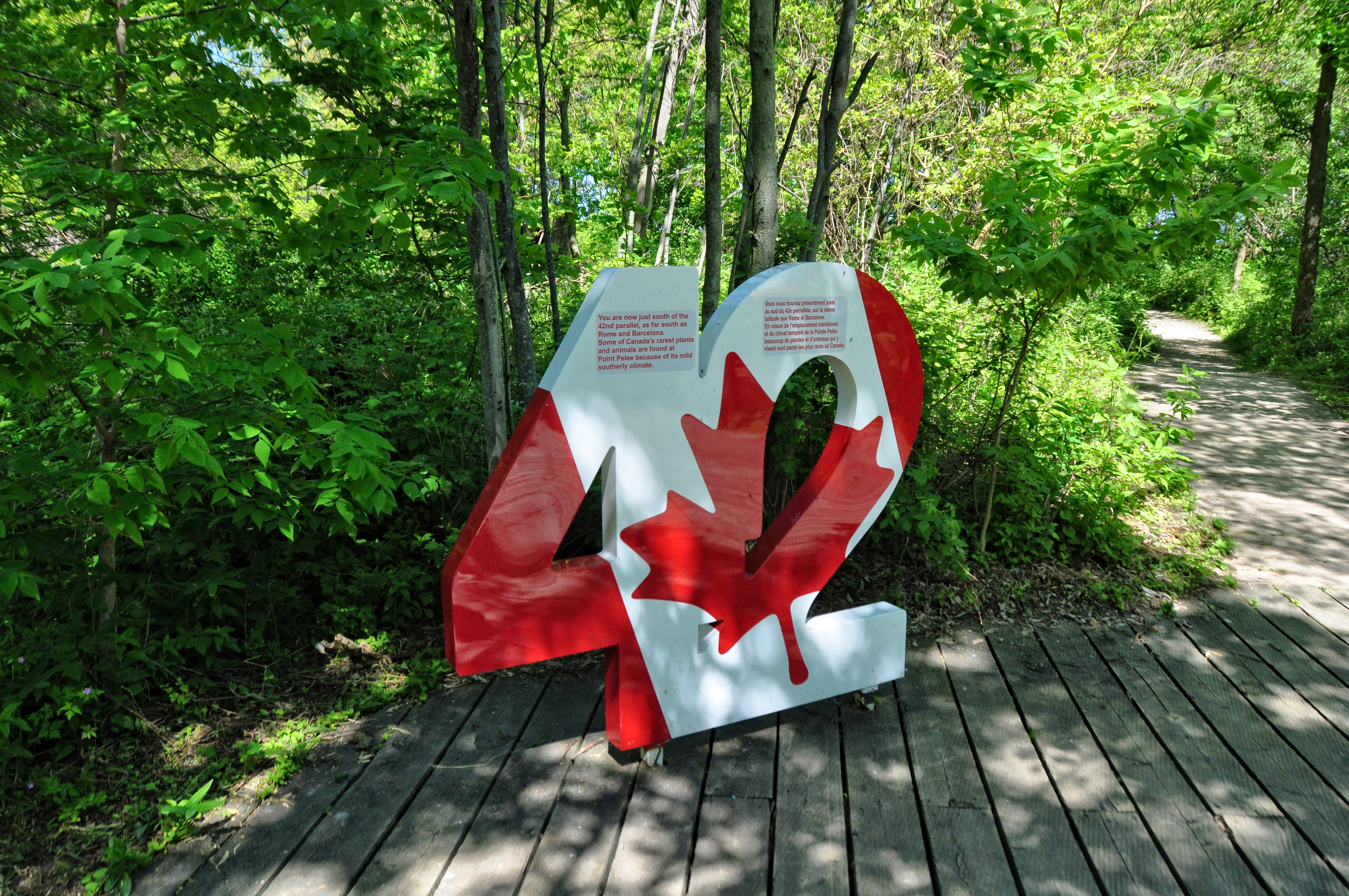
42nd parallel landmark at Point Pelee National Park

The parallel 42° north passes through the southern end of Lake Michigan and Lake Erie. Part of the water boundary between Canada and the United States passes south of the 42nd parallel. The southern tip of the Canadian province of Ontario just barely goes south of it at Point Pelee and Pelee Island, while the southernmost portion of the Town of Essex at Colchester is located below the 42nd parallel.

== See also ==
- 41st parallel north
- 43rd parallel north
- The Twin Tiers region of New York and Pennsylvania
- The "Jefferson" region of Oregon and California
