= Bradford Era =

Pennsylvania newspaper

- Type: Daily newspaper
- Format: Broadsheet
- Editor: Jim Eckstrom
- Founded: 1875
- Headquarters: 43 Main St, Bradford, Pennsylvania, United States
- Circulation: 13,000 paid / 2,500 unpaid
- OCLC number: 14866399
- Website: bradfordera.com

The Bradford Era is a newspaper published Monday – Saturday serving McKean County in Pennsylvania. The American Newspapers Representatives database lists the Bradford Era's daily paid circulation as 13,000 and its unpaid circulation as 2,500. Jim Eckstrom is the Executive Group Editor for the paper. It is owned by Community Media Group, Inc.

== History ==
The Bradford Era was founded by Col. J.K. Haffey in 1875 as the Bradford Daily Era. By 1877 it was a four-page, 36 column paper. In 1879 the Bradford Era was consolidated with the Daily Breeze, a local paper that had been in publication for only a year. Many newspapers had preceded it in the county, but it was Bradford's 2nd newspaper, and it sought to distinguish itself as an independent alternative, under the motto, "We do not run the paper for glory or notoriety; that we could have obtained by becoming the president of a savings bank, pocketing the depositors' money, then going to State prison."

The Bradford Era's early reporting focused on the local oil industry. It initially mounted a defense of Equitable Oil against Standard Oil, and noted Equitable Oil's achievements even though Standard Oil was trying to squash all local competition. Other local papers such as the Blaze took even more extreme stand, the Blaze once printing in blood-red ink to protest Standard Oil.

But by the early 1880s, the Bradford Era was owned and operated by businessmen with interests in Standard Oil and the Era became a mouthpiece for the company. In 1887, the Era Publishing Company was incorporated as a company and Patrick C. Boyle was the editor. Boyle and others used the paper to advocate against legislation, like the Billingsley Bill, which sought to regulate the oil industry. In addition, numerous editors for papers around the area were paid "pensions" for supporting Standard Oil interests in their printings. Boyle used the paper to attack people who opposed the monopoly of Standard Oil, such as Senator Lewis Emery . Emery grew so tired of the attacks that he had Boyle arrested for libel; Standard Oil paid to have him released from jail and to continue his slander campaign. Boyle was sent to Ohio in 1889 and put in charge of the Toledo Commercial.

The Bradford Era was mentioned in testimony in United States v. Standard Oil, in which the government sued the company under the Sherman Antitrust Act of 1890; the case was argued at the 8th Circuit Court in Missouri in 1909. That decision was later taken to the Supreme Court in 1911 and upheld, in Standard Oil Co. of New Jersey v. United States, and led to the break-up of Standard Oil into 34 separate and competing companies.

In 1919, the Bradford Era became the first newspaper in the country to offer profit-sharing to its employees. The move was directed and announced by J.W. Milligan, who was president and general manager of the paper and its company, Era Publishing Company. J. W. Milligan served on a committee to present President Warren G. Harding (who had also been a newspaperman) with a chair purchased with funds contributed by publishers across the country. He managed the paper until his death in 1931. The paper continued under Milligan's sons until it was sold to M.R. Shale.

In 1938, M.R. Shale oversaw the merger of three Pennsylvania papers, the Era, Evening Star-Record, and the Sunday Herald under the Era Publishing Company. Shale had recently purchased the Era.

In the 1990s, Bradford Publishing Company, which then owned the Era, was owned in part by David Radler and Conrad Black. Radler and Black were investigated by US Securities and Exchange Commission (and Canadian authorities as well) for fraud. Part of their fraud involved the purchase and sale of various newspapers in the Bradford Publishing Company. They were eventually indicted and Radler settled with the SEC and with Sun-Times Media Group.

In 2017 and 2018, Bradford Publishing Company acquired many local newspapers in Pennsylvania and New York, including Olean Times Herald, The Ellicottville Times, Chautauqua Star, and Springville Times. Bradford Publishing Company is now owned by Community Media Group.

== Notable reporting ==
In 1999, the Bradford Era joined several Pennsylvania newspapers in Project Open, a project to test the effectiveness of Pennsylvania's Sunshine Law and Right to Know Act, which required the release of requested public records. The newspapers' audits, through various requests to state and city government agencies, showed that many requests for public records were being denied, especially police records, telephone records, and salary records for school superintendents.

In 2012, the Era reported on the trial of Samuel Slocum, a priest who was accused of having an inappropriate relationship with a minor.

In 2016, the Bradford Era reported that Zippo Manufacturing Company, which is located in Bradford, made its 550 millionth Zippo lighter.
