= Twin Tiers =

Counties on the New York-Pennsylvania border

Coordinates: 42°0′N 77°15′W

- Region
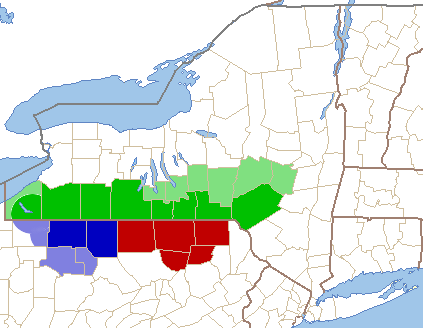
- Counties in dark green are almost always considered part of the Southern Tier. Counties in dark red indicate the Northern Tier.
- Interactive map of Twin Tiers

Population
  - Total: 850,000

The Twin Tiers are the collective counties that lie on the New York–Pennsylvania border on either side of the 42nd parallel north. The region is predominantly rural and contains many small towns.

Separately, the two halves of the Twin Tiers region are known as the Southern Tier region in the state of New York and the Northern Tier region in the Commonwealth of Pennsylvania. The "Northern" and "Southern" designations are relative to the states in which they are located, not relative to each other.

== Constituent counties ==
The Twin Tiers region is usually defined as including these counties:

Northern Tier	Southern Tier
Bradford County, Pennsylvania; Sullivan County, Pennsylvania; Tioga County, Pennsylvania; Susquehanna County, Pennsylvania; Wyoming County, Pennsylvania; McKean County, Pennsylvania; Potter County, Pennsylvania	Delaware County, New York; Broome County, New York; Tioga County, New York; Chemung County, New York; Steuben County, New York; Allegany County, New York; Cattaraugus County, New York

McKean, Potter, and (less often) Cameron Counties refer to themselves as part of the Twin Tiers, but almost never consider themselves part of the Northern Tier, instead going by the name "Northern Pennsylvania". Significant ambiguity often exists in regions: for instance, the western part of the region (McKean and Potter Counties) often associate themselves with St. Marys, a city larger than any city in that area, but in Elk County, just south of what is considered "Northern Tier" by any standard. This broader area is also known as the Pennsylvania Wilds.

Erie County, Pennsylvania, and Warren County, Pennsylvania, are almost never considered part of the Twin Tiers, though portions of Warren County are occasionally associated with the rest of the region.

== History ==
The region was historically a disputed territory in the history of the United States prior to its founding. The Northern Tier was claimed by Pennsylvania Colony and Connecticut Colony, while the Southern Tier was claimed by Pennsylvania, Province of Massachusetts Bay, and New York Colony. Various treaties and land sales eventually placed the Northern Tier in Pennsylvania's hands and the Southern Tier in New York's.

The region's name originated in 1968 as part of a marketing campaign in the Elmira Star-Gazette that used twins.

== See also ==
- Erie Triangle
- New York-Pennsylvania border
- Penn-York Valley
